= Lists of Roman sites =

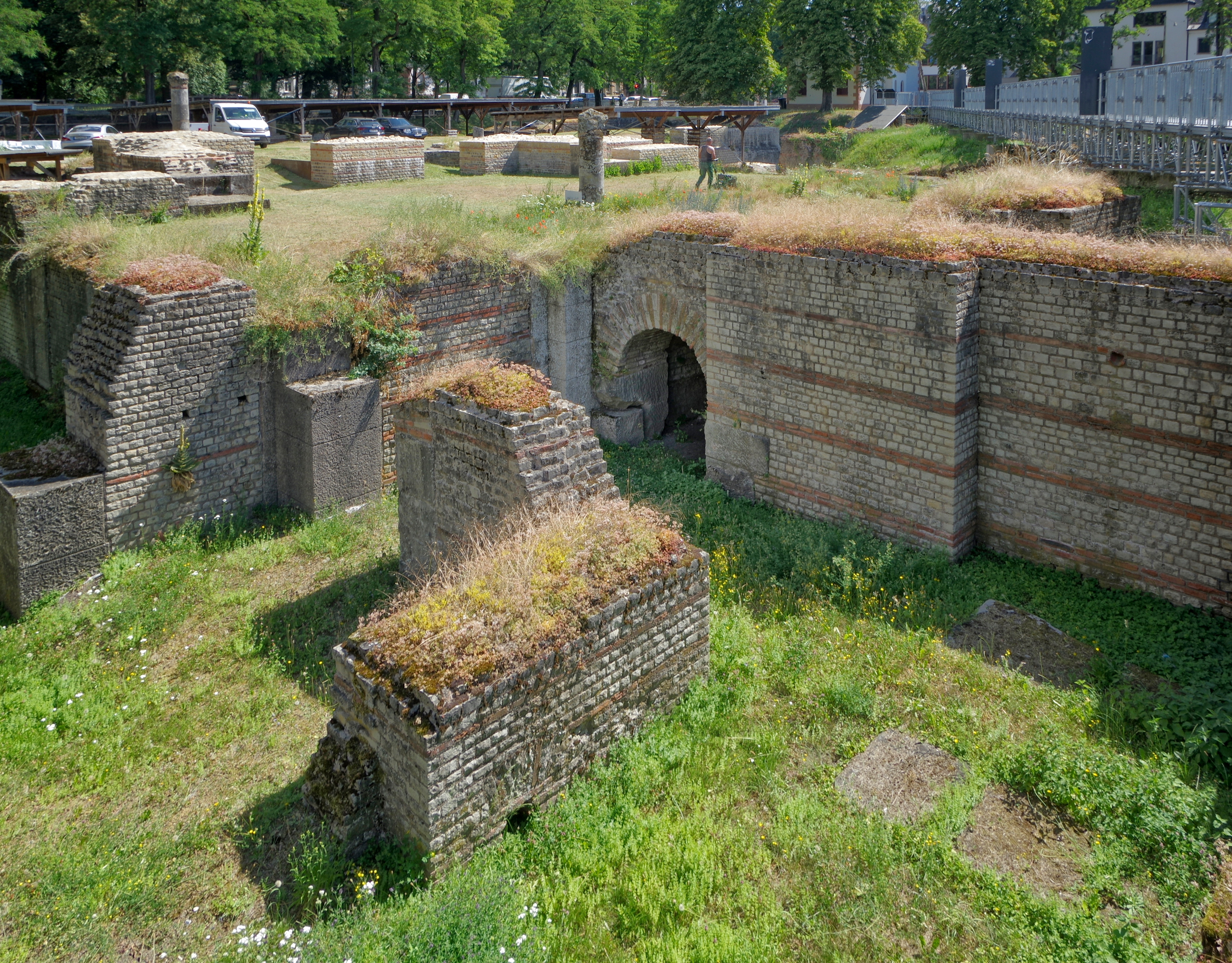
Barbara Baths in Trier (formerly Augusta Treverorum), Germany

The following are lists of Roman sites, sorted by present-day countries.

== Albania ==
- Ad Quintum
- Amphitheatre of Durrës
- Apollonia
- Butrint
- Byllis
- Hadrianopolis
- Oricum
- Tirana Mosaic
- Strikçan Roman burial

== Algeria ==
- Cuicul
- Thamugadi
- Tipasa

== Austria ==
- Brigantium
- Carnuntum
- Clunia
- Flavia Solva
- Vindobona
- Virunum

== Bulgaria ==
- Augusta Traiana
- Diocletianopolis
- Oescus
- Philippopolis
- Roman Thermae (Varna)
- Serdica

== Croatia ==
- Aquae Iasae
- Epidaurum
- Pola
- Pula Arena
- Ragusa
- Salona
- Burnum
- Issa
- Mursa
- Andautonia
- Halikan
- Zara
- Tarsatica
- Siscia

== Cyprus ==
- Paphos Archaeological Park

== Egypt ==
- Andropolis
- Antinoöpolis
- Via Hadriana

== France ==
- Arena of Nîmes
- Argentoratum
- Augustodunum
- Avaricum
- Cenabum
- Durocortorum
- Itius Portus
- Lugdunum
- Lutetia
- Pont du Gard
- Roman Theatre of Arles
- Roman theatre of Lillebonne
- Roman theater of Montaudou
- Trémonteix sanctuary
- Via Aquitania
- Via Domitia

== Germany ==
- Abusina
- Augusta Treverorum
- Augusta Vindelicorum
- Caesar's Rhine bridges
- Cambodunum
- Colonia Claudia Ara Agrippinensium
- Colonia Ulpia Traiana
- Constantia Castrum
- Igel Column
- Mogontiacum
- Novaesium
- Noviomagus Nemetum
- Vetera

== Greece ==
- Gate of Athena Archegetis
- Hadrian's Arch
- Hadrian's Library
- Nicopolis
- Odeon of Agrippa
- Roman Agora

== Hungary ==
- Aquincum
- Brigetio

== Israel ==
- Aelia Capitolina
- Caesarea Maritima

== Italy ==
- Amphitheatre of Cagliari
- Amphitheatre of Capua
- Aqua Augusta (Naples)
- Aqua Augusta (Rome)
- Aquileia
- Aternum
- Brundisium
- Castra Albana
- Castrum Novum
- Hadrian's Villa
- Herculaneum
- Mediolanum
- Oplontis
- Ostia Antica
- Pompeii
- Portus
- Roman theatre, Verona
- Roma
- Stabiae
- Via Appia
- Via Claudia Augusta
- Via Flaminia
- Via Julia Augusta
- Vicus Martis Tudertium
- Villa Boscoreale
- Villa Jovis

== Lebanon ==
- Augusti Pagus
- Berytus
- Niha
- Temple of Bacchus
- Temple of Jupiter

== Libya ==
- Leptis Magna
- Oea
- Sabratha

== Liechtenstein ==
- Schaan Castrum

== Morocco ==
- Amphitheater of Lixus
- Roman roads in Morocco
- Tingis
- Volubilis

== North Macedonia ==
- Scupi

== Portugal ==
- Archaeological Site of Colaride
- Castro de Leceia
- Centum Cellas
- Conímbriga
- Fountain of Armés
- Roman Bridge of Catribana
- Roman Dam of Belas
- Roman ruins of Casais Velhos
- Roman villa of Almoinhas
- Roman villa of Alto da Cidreira
- Roman villa of Ammaia
- Roman villa of Frielas
- Roman villa of Freiria
- Roman villa of Outeiro de Polima
- Roman villa of Quinta da Bolacha
- Roman villa of Santo André de Almoçageme
- Roman villa of Vilares

== Romania ==
- Castellum Mattiacorum
- Castra Centum Putei
- Civitas Tropaensium
- Constantine's Bridge (Danube)
- Dierna
- Limes Alutanus
- Napoca
- Noviodunum ad Istrum
- Porolissum
- Tibiscum
- Ulpia Traiana Sarmizegetusa

== Serbia ==
- Acumincum
- Diana Fort
- Felix Romuliana
- Justiniana Prima
- Mediana
- Singidunum
- Sirmium
- Trajan's Bridge
- Viminacium

== Switzerland ==
- Ad Fines
- Agaunum
- Aquae Helveticae
- Arbor Felix
- Augusta Munatiana
- Augusta Raurica
- Aventicum
- Centum Prata
- Curia Raetorum
- Irgenhausen Castrum
- Iuliomagus (Schleitheim)
- Lousonna
- Noviodunum (Colonia Iulia Equestris)
- Petinesca
- Tasgetium
- Turicum
- Vindonissa
- Vitudurum

== Syria ==
- Camp of Diocletian
- Roman Theatre at Palmyra
- Temple of Jupiter

== The Netherlands ==
- Nigrum Pullum
- Traiectum

== Tunisia ==
- Amphitheatre of El Jem
- Thugga
- Thysdrus

== Turkey ==
- Aqueduct of Valens
- Attalea in Lydia
- Constantinople
- Hadrian's Gate
- Library of Celsus
- Red Basilica
- Roman Baths of Ankara
- Roman mausoleums of Araban
- Roman road in Cilicia
- Roman Theatre of Aspendos
- Temple of Apollo

== United Kingdom ==
- Londinium
- Roman sites in Lincolnshire
- Roman sites in the Peak District
- Villas in England
- Villas in Wales

== See also ==
- List of aqueducts in the Roman Empire
- List of cities founded by the Romans
- List of Roman bridges
- List of Roman public baths
- List of Roman theatres
- Roman Africa
- Roman roads in Africa
