= Roman Bridge of Catribana =

Roman bridge near Sintra, Portugal

- Ponte Romana da Catribana
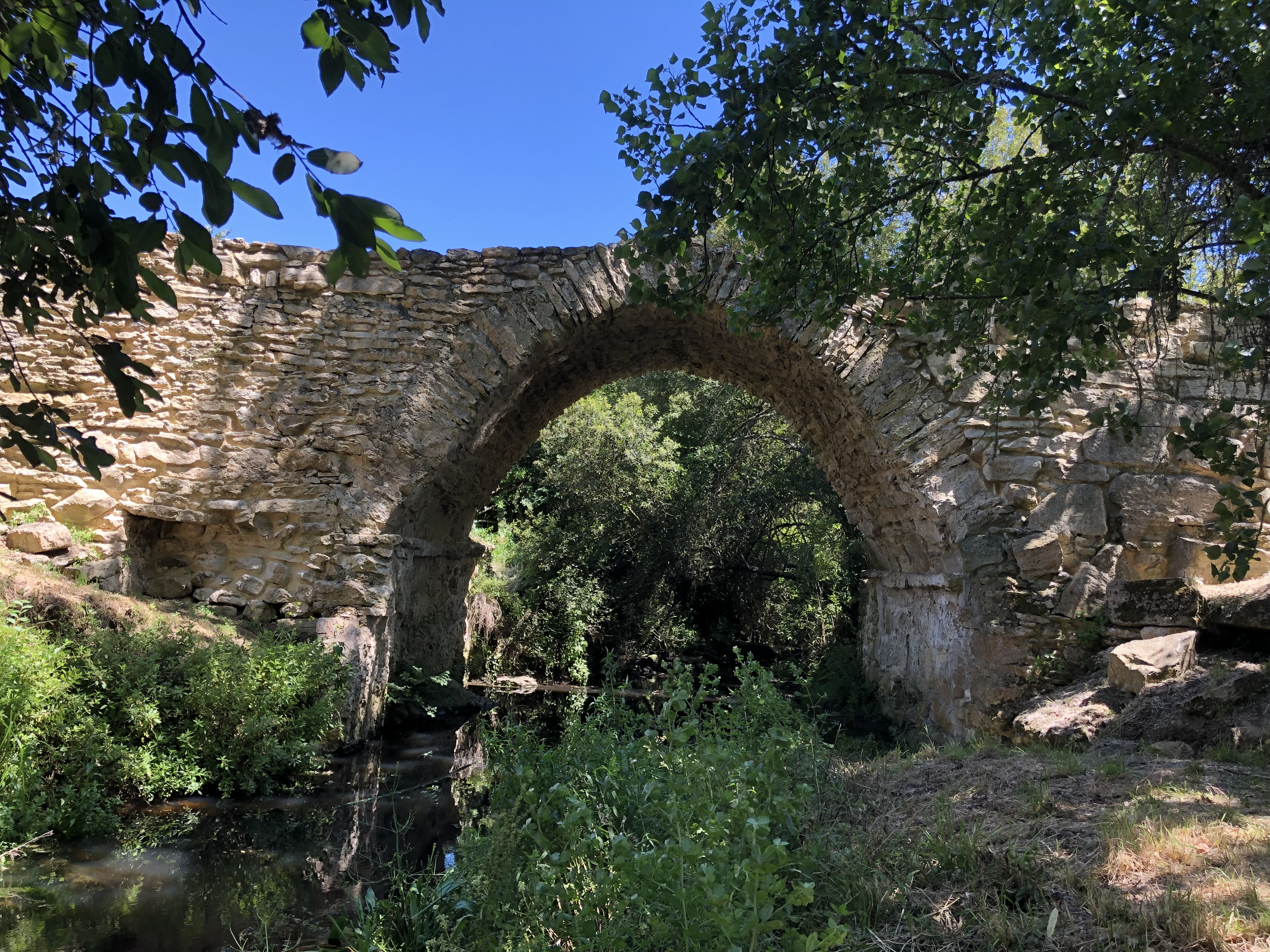
- Interactive map of Roman Bridge of Catribana
- 38°53′20″N 9°24′49″W
- Cultures: Roman Empire
- Location: Sintra, Lisbon, Portugal

Site notes
- Archaeologists: unknown
- Discovered: 1980s
- Owner: Sintra Municipality
- Public access: Yes

The Roman Bridge of Catribana is located near the village of Catribana in the parish of São João das Lampas, in the municipality of Sintra in the Lisbon District of Portugal. Not being identified as a Roman bridge until the 1980s, and having suffered considerable degradation, it was restored in 2019.

The bridge, which crosses the Bolelas stream, is made of local limestone blocks. It is likely to have provided access for a Roman villa to a main road or connected two important Roman villas at the time when the area was part of the Roman Olisipo (roughly corresponding to the modern-day Lisbon Municipality), in the province of Lusitania, which formed part of the Roman Empire. It is composed of a single arch and parapet, and has undergone several changes over the centuries. On its south side is a section of a Roman path, about 50 meters long, which gives access to the bridge. Close to the bridge archaeologists have identified vestiges of a Roman-era cemetery together with remains of a Neolithic settlement.

== See also ==
- Archaeological Museum of São Miguel de Odrinhas
- List of bridges in Portugal
