= Archaeological Site of Colaride =

- Estação Romana de Colaride
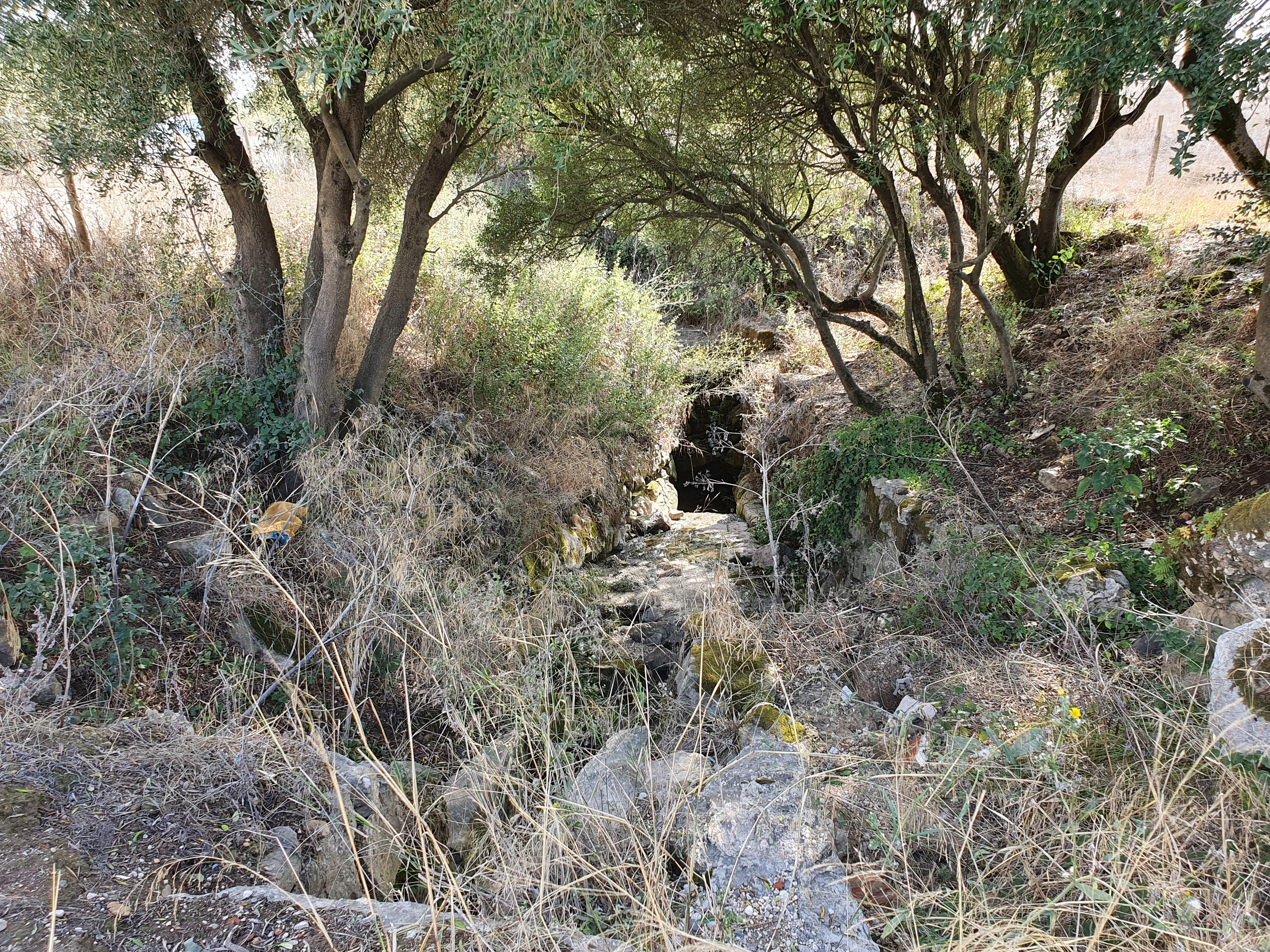
- Interactive map of Archaeological Site of Colaride
- 38.765289°N 9.289453°W
- Type: Necropolis
- Location: Lisbon, Greater Lisbon, Lisbon, Portugal

Site notes
- Archaeologists: unknown
- Owner: Portuguese Republic
- Public access: Private Alto de Colaride
- Website: Official website

The archaeological site of Colaride, is a Roman necropolis in a natural cave, located in the Portuguese civil parish of Agualva e Mira-Sintra, municipality of Sintra.

== Site ==
The archaeological site of Colaride is characterized by long reuses of space with a first occupation dated from the Middle Paleolithic, having been exhumed several instruments of flint corresponding to four differentiated workshops that used the raw material from the region. Some bronze objects found in the area also point to a Proto-Historic occupation although structures from this period are not known.

The site was later occupied during the Roman period, (centuries I and III), having been found traces of a necropolis associated with a housing cluster with the same chronology. Still from Roman times, it was identified in a higher area in relation to what is believed to be the habitat nucleus, an open quarry, which may be related to the need for raw material for the construction of buildings. In relation to the archaeological remains exhumed during the archaeological interventions carried out over the years, some stand out: the prehistoric flint artifacts, a Bronze Age sickle casting mold, loom weights, various fragments of pottery from the Roman period (namely terra sigillata), construction material such as tegulae, imbrices and traces of mortar (opus signinum) and, also, a bronze ring.

The collected artifacts are currently deposited at the Archaeological Museum of São Miguel de Odrinhas and at the Museu Nacional de Arqueologia.

== History ==
The site was first occupied during the Middle Paleolithic period and was continually occupied until the Roman era, from ceramics discovered and dated from the site.

Around the 1880s, the archaeological site was discovered by military engineer and geologist Carlos Ribeiro (then in service to the Commissão Geológica de Portugal, under the Ministerio das Obras Publicas, Commercio e Industria), but in 1898 the Roman necropolis was unearthed by agricultural workers. Located at the entrance to a natural grotto, the site was prospected by British naturalists and by the director of the Portuguese ethnographic museum, José Leite de Vasconcellos (1858-1941). At the time of its discovery the Sintra Gazette referred to the discovery of various human remains and a gold ring. A session of the Real Associação dos Architectos Civis e Archeologos Portugueses (Portuguese Royal Association of Civil Architecture and Archaeologists), realized in the same year, announced the discovery of Roman tombs, noted by the discovery of bones, an inscribed bronze ring and fragments of opus signinum. These new discoveries piqued the interest of the Portuguese scientific community.

In 1915, Paul Choffat moved to the location, where he collected various artefacts, which were later sent to the National Archaeology Museum (Museu Nacional de Arqueologia). Among these objects was a rare mould used for a scythe, which was used as an example of Bronze Age construction into the first quarter of the 20th century.

The site was regularly visited by specialists and the curious during the 19th century, although a full examination of the zone was undertaken in the 1970s, unearthing fragments of ceramics (terra sigillata) and Roman construction materials, such as tegula and imbrices. These fragments suggested the existence of an inhabited centre, supported by the necropolis. The excavation of the area for the installation of a natural gas pipeline in the region, during the 1990s, also identified a rock quarry used by Roman inhabitants during the same period. Similar fragments were later discovered in the late 1970s, and forwarded to the Museum of Odrinhas (Museu de Odrinhas).

The first suggestion to classify the site was made by the Associação de Património Olho Vivo on 30 January 1995, which was supported by the municipal council of Sintra on 10 July 1997. The process to classify the site was initiated by the Vice-President of the IPPAR on 7 June 1999. On 28 May 2007, a proposal by the DRLisboa suggested that the site by classified a Property of Public Interest, setting a special protection zone for the site. By 32 October there was support by the consultative council of IGESPAR to the sites protection. On 20 September 2011, the decision to classify the property as a Monument of Public Interest (Monumento de Interesse Público) was established (Announcement 13106/2011; Diário da República, Série, 181).

== Architecture ==
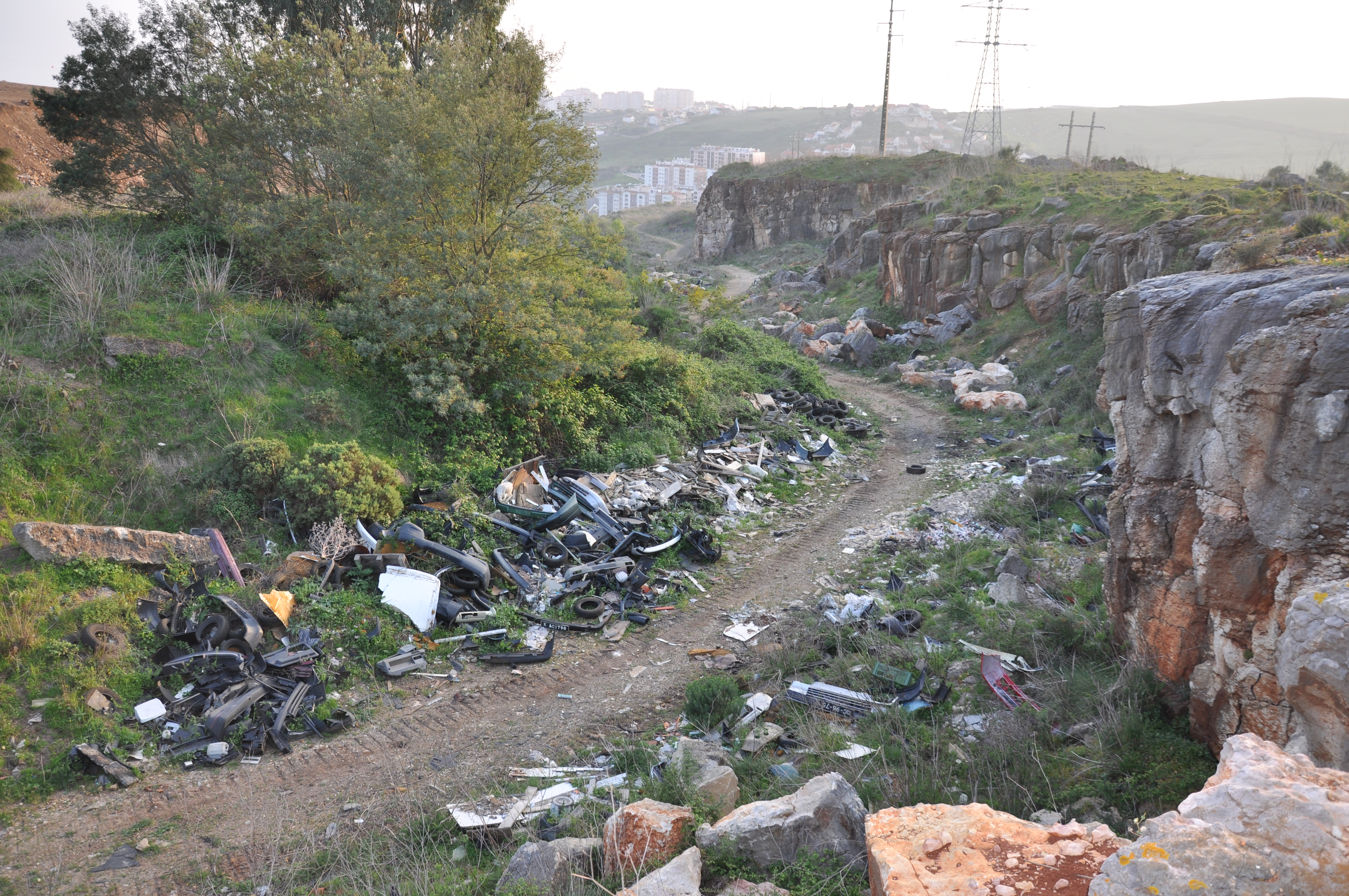
The deplorable state of the Roman quarry of Colaride, near the city of Agualva-Cacém, in Sintra

The Archaeological Site of Colaride occupies a considerable area along a platform located on a spur overlooking the Ribeira de Ossos. It is located 2.2 kilometres (1.4 mi) west of the geodesic marker of Monte Abraão, and circled to the northeast by the Colaride grotto and southwest by old mill of Rocanes. Surface finds (terra sigillata, tegula and imbrices) indicate a possible villa but only a Roman quarry dating from the 1st to 3rd centuries AD is confirmed.

== See also ==
- Olisipo
