= Roman villa of Frielas =

Roman villa near Loures, Portugal

Roman Ruins of Frielas
- Archeological site of Frielas
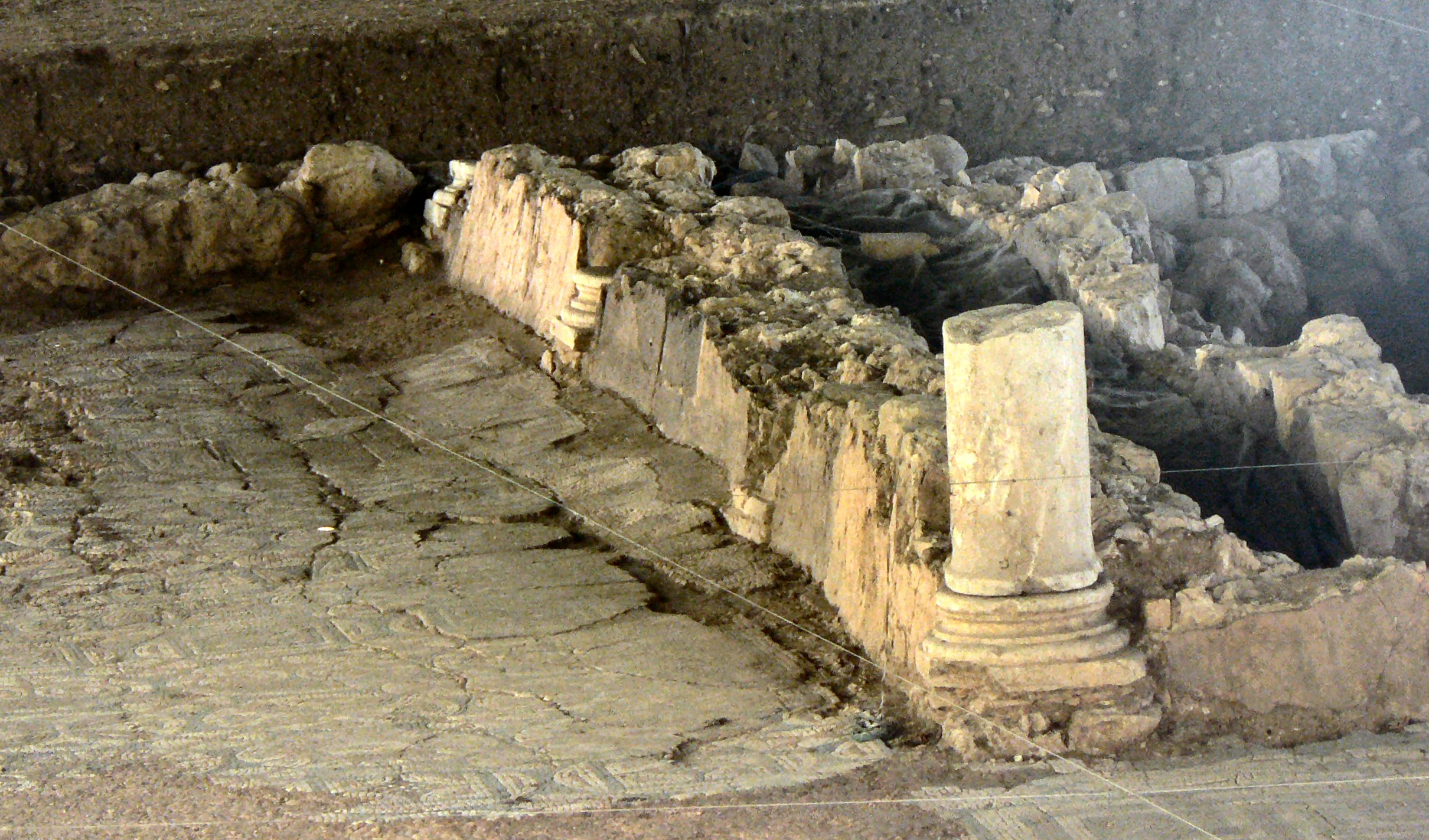
- Interactive map of Roman Ruins of Frielas
- 38.8268747°N 9.1438332°W
- Type: Ruins
- Cultures: Roman Empire
- Location: Frielas, Loures, Lisbon district, Greater Lisbon, Portugal

Site notes
- Archaeologists: unknown
- Owner: Portuguese Republic
- Public access: Private, Frielas

The Roman Villa of Frielas is located in the parish of Frielas in the municipality of Loures in the Lisbon District of Portugal. It fell under the territory of the Roman settlement of Olisipo, which covered a large area from Lisbon to the south to Torres Vedras in the north. It is believed to have been re-used in the medieval period during the Islamic occupation of Portugal. Excavations began in 1997 and are continuing, over an area of about 3500 square metres. Since 2012 the villa has been classified as a Site of Public Interest.

== History ==
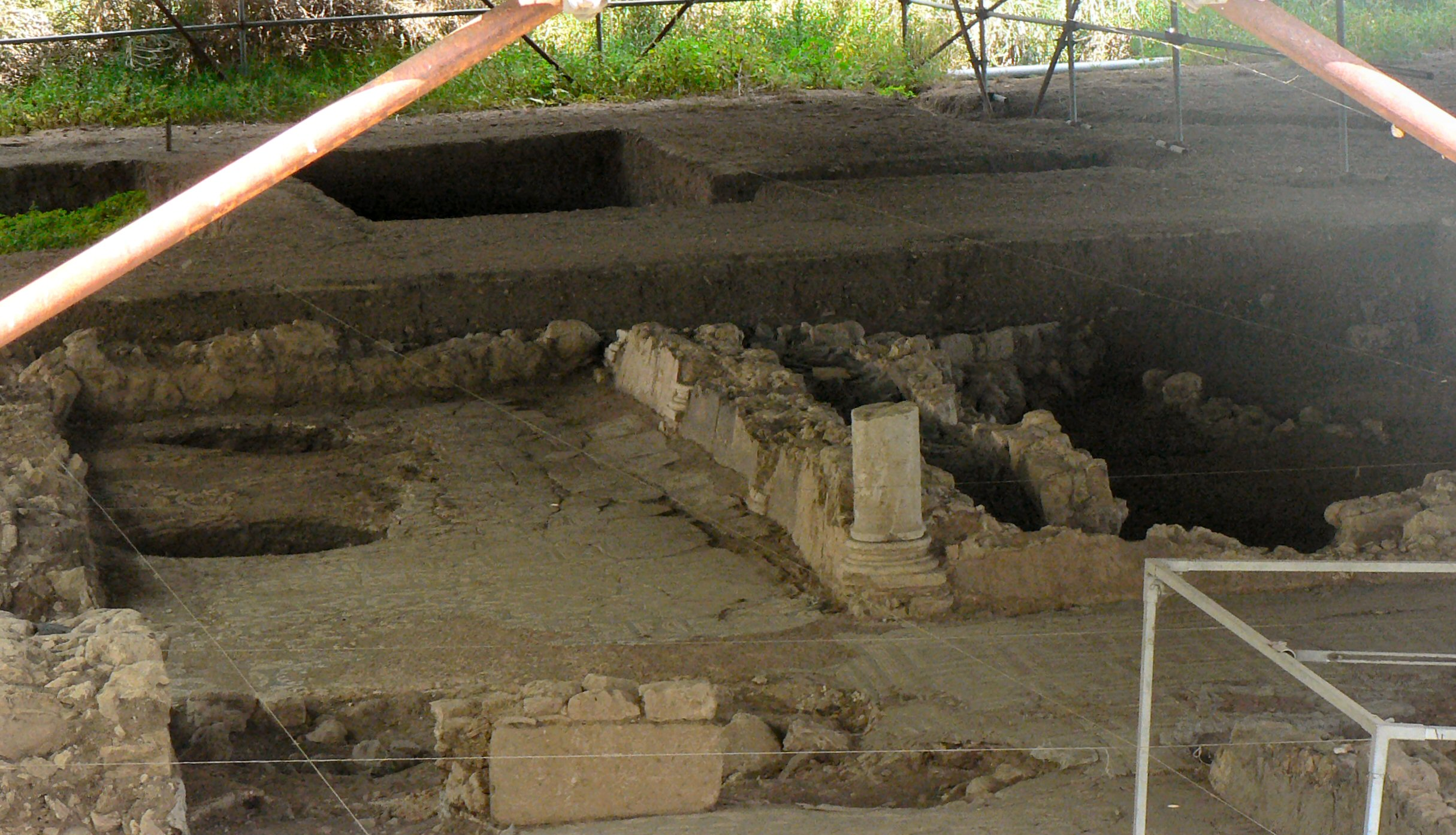
Ruins at the archaeological station, showing silos (background)

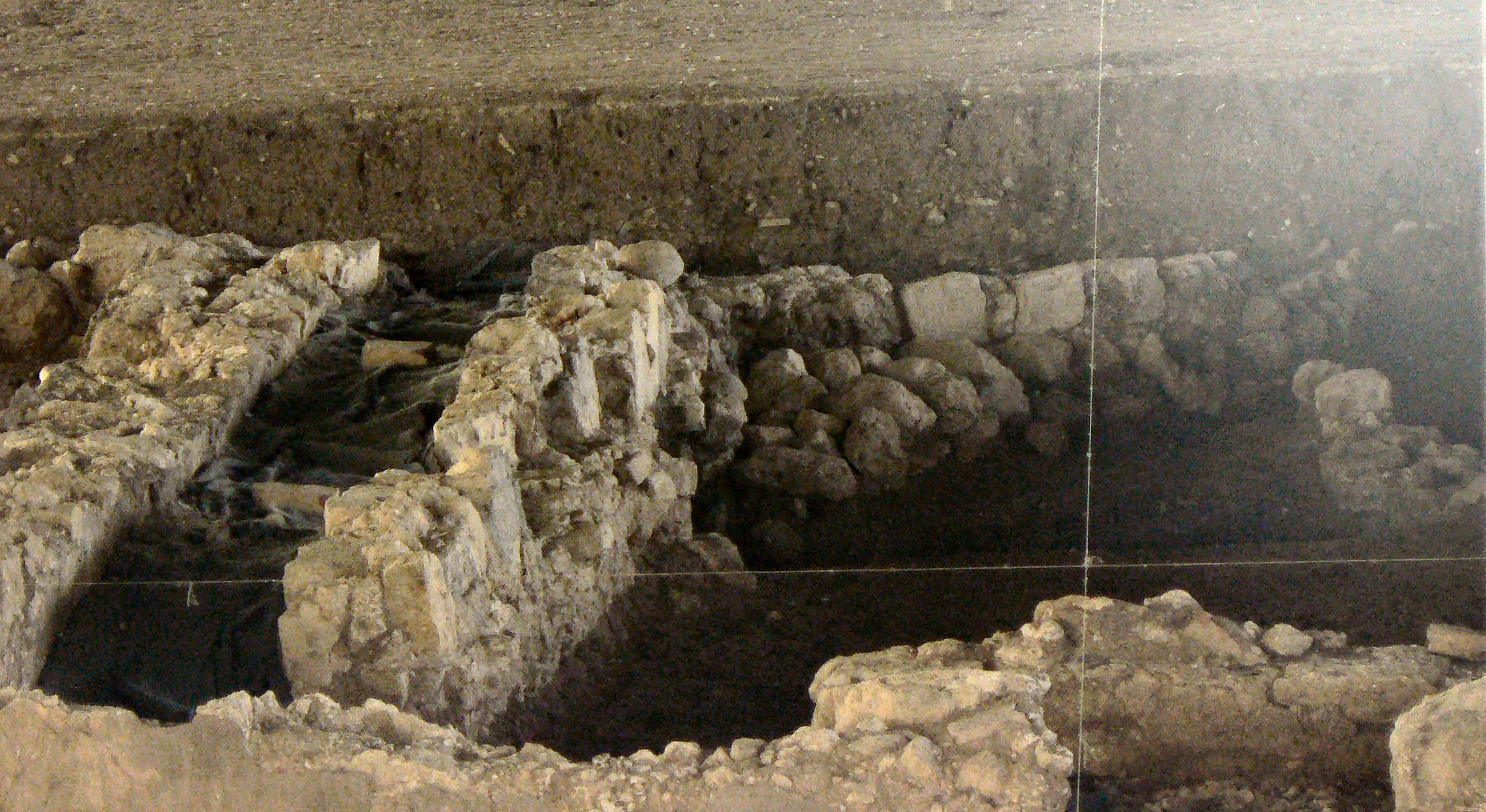
Part of the excavations on site

Its founding resulted from the fertile lands and agricultural harvests in the area, influenced by the confluence of three watercourses that fed the Trancão River in the lowlands of Loures. The settlement was founded sometime between the 3rd and 4th century, and remained occupied until the 7th century. The villa benefited from the proximity of the river, which was navigable, provided a water supply and facilitated fishing. Above all the river ensured that its land was highly fertile. It was about 2 kilometres from the bridge of the road that connected Olisipo to Conímbriga, the large Roman settlement to the north, near present-day Coimbra.

Vestiges from the Middle Ages suggest that the site continued to have an important place in the agrarian community, even as it started to decline. It has been interpreted that the segmentation of the property could have led to the founding of Frielas in the late Moorish occupation (sometime in the 12th century). It is clear that the Roman buildings continued to be occupied in the Medieval era (from the appearance of clay pots and the reorientation of spaces within the compounds, including the construction of silos). From the Moorish period a burial stone was discovered (in the 19th century) a short distance from the archaeological excavation. The Islamic community remained in this area as late as the Reconquista and vestiges until 1147, from this period that are groups of ceramics dating to the 9th and 10th century.

Following the Reconquista, Frielas was transformed into the centre of the region, and the former Roman villa was destroyed by Castilian troops in 1383. This included an important tower, annex the main building, that guarded the road to Lisbon. The residential building was never rebuilt, even after the Count of Ribeira Grande made an attempt in the 17th century. The ruins scarred the property, and only the chapel of Santa Catarina remained, reflecting the archaeological importance.

The first archaeological excavations began in 1997 and on 27 October the municipal council of Loures proposed the classification of the site. Many of the artefacts located on site were collected and stored in the Municipal Museum of Loures.

Yet, nothing ever developed from this proposal and a secondary petition was made on 21 March 2002. On 12 October 2004 the process was opened by the vice-president of the IPPAR Instituto Português do Património Arquitectónico), the national architectural heritage institute. It was followed on 26 January 2012 by a proposal to classify the structures by the DRCLVTejo as a Sítio de Interesse Público (Site of Public Interest) and included in its respective zone of special protection. The proposal was approved on 29 February of the Cultural National Council.

== Architecture ==
Implanted alongside the ravine of Póvoa, the settlement was formed away from its banks, to escape flooding from the River Trancão, near Sacavém. The Roman village was one of the more important archaeological sites in the municipality of Loures; it reflects the Roman organization and planning that persisted during the period of Imperial Rome until the early Middle Ages.

The site has been explored systematically since 1997. The terra sigillata soils were very settled in this region and the excavated area did not permit a rigorous investigation. Artefacts discovered on the site include fragments of Roman mosaics, discovered in 1997 near the Chapel of Santa Catarina; unearthed and examined, the items dated to the 3rd century, suggesting a longer period of settlement. It is unclear what purpose the place of its discovery was used; the mosaic was part of the principal pavement of one of the principal halls/rooms in the residential building. More recent campaigns identified peristyles of various levels of destruction, and a triclinium, as well as other unidentified structures. There are various walls of differing heights and orientations, making interpretation difficult.

== See also ==
- Olisipo
