= Roman villa of Alto da Cidreira =

- Alto do Cidreira
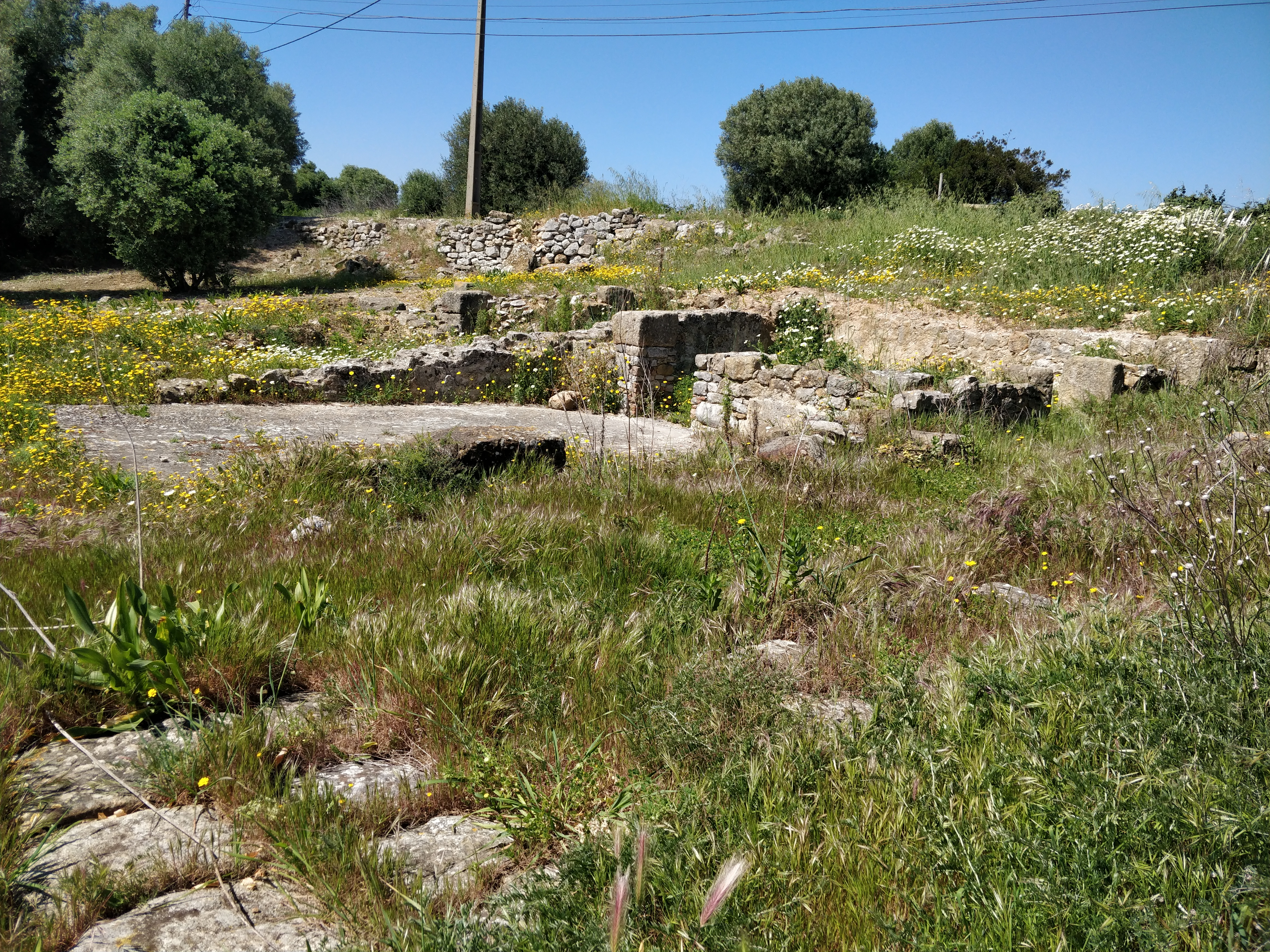
- Interactive map of Roman villa of Alto da Cidreira
- 38°43′26.23″N 9°25′16.39″W
- Type: Ruins
- Location: Lisbon, Greater Lisbon, Lisbon, Portugal

Site notes
- Elevation: 100 m (330 ft)
- Length: 612.62 m (2,009.9 ft)
- Width: 217.63 m (714.0 ft)
- Archaeologists: Guilherme Cardoso and José d'Encarnação
- Owner: Portuguese Republic
- Public access: Public Estrada Cascais-Sintra, intersecting Carrascal do Alvide

The Roman villa of Alto da Cidreira (Portuguese: Vila romana do Alto da Cidreira) is a Roman villa in the civil parish of Alcabideche, municipality of Cascais, in the Lisbon District of Portugal. Although known since the 1890s, this site has largely been neglected by archaeologists, resulting in destruction of artefacts, including Roman era mosaics, a bath complex and an olive oil cellar.

== History ==
The territory of the municipality of Cascais has been an active zone of human occupation since the Neolithic period. It was extensively explored during the Roman occupation of the Iberian Peninsula, as evidenced by the complex industrial base uncovered on this site, near the centre of the Roman Olisipo (now Lisbon). Terra sigillata ceramics discovered on the site suggest that it was mainly occupied in the second half of the 1st century AD and first half of the second. There is an assumption that the area was abandoned at the end of the 2nd century or during the 3rd century, but a reoccupation occurred in the 4th and 5th century. The site was identified by Francisco de Paula Oliveira of the Portuguese geological services, who first referred to the Roman villa in 1899.

In 1915, Félix Alves Pereira of the Associação dos Arqueólogos Portugueses (Portuguese Association of Archaeologists) visited the locality, following excavations by an agronomist Caetano da Silva Luz, Viscount of Coruche (1842–1904). Three tanks decorated with opus signinum were identified but these were later partially destroyed in the 1960s during the construction of some nearby residences. It was necessary to wait until 1977 before the site was fully examined, and then full systematic excavations were carried out between 1980 and 1981, by archaeologists Guilherme Cardoso and José d'Encarnação.

On 25 November 2007, it was proposed that the area be classified as part of a Zone of Special Protection, by the municipal council of Cascais. This was approved by the DRCLVTejo on 14 May 2008, and tentatively by IGESPAR on 11 June of that year.

== Architecture ==
The site is in an urban area, on an elevated hilltop alongside a survey marker, João Cidreira, next to a number of houses. The domus consisted of a two-storey building, with a few spaces paved in polychromatic mosaics, along with a their respective thermae complex. In addition to the three tanks, some medieval silos and receptacles from the same period were discovered. It is likely that the villa was reused over the several centuries of occupation for other purposes.

The site included a thermal bath, with associated conduits for water and heating, which were destroyed by both natural and human action. Also identified were a semi-circular tank for cold water baths (frigidarium), in addition to a praefurnium used for the heating of air which circulated in the caverns beneath the baths (heating both the tanks and floors).

In addition to the terra sigilatta, the archaeologists discovered a number of remnants of ceramics, construction materials (such as imbrices and tegulae), shards of bronze, buttons and a small terracotta mask (which has since been put on display in the Condes de Castro Guimarães Museum, in Cascais.
