= Santo António dos Cavaleiros e Frielas =

- Civil parish
- Location in Portugal
- Coordinates: 38.814°N 9.167°W
- Country: Portugal
- Region: Lisbon
- Metropolitan area: Lisbon
- District: Lisbon
- Municipality: Loures

Area
  - Total: 9.20 km^{2} (3.55 sq mi)

Population (2011)
  - Total: 28,052
  - Density: 3,000/km^{2} (7,900/sq mi)
- Time zone: UTC+00:00 (WET)
  - Summer (DST): UTC+01:00 (WEST)

Santo António dos Cavaleiros e Frielas is a civil parish in the municipality of Loures, Portugal. It was formed in 2013 by the merger of the former parishes Santo António dos Cavaleiros and Frielas. The population in 2011 was 28,052, in an area of 9.20 km^{2}.
