= Lucius Iulius Maelo Caudicus =

Lucius Iulius Maelo Caudicus, born in 10 B.C., in the Olisipo region of Granja dos Serrões. The name Caudicus indicates an indigenous origin, who came to importance as the duumviri of Olisipo, and later, the flamen of the cult of Augustus.

He founded a villa with the probable name of "villa Caudicana", now known as Godigana (near Terrugem). In 20 AD he built a fountain in Armés that is still present. He also fulfilled religious vows in a Temple of Jupiter located in Granja do Marquês.

== See also ==
- Olisipo
