= Roman ruins of Casais Velhos =

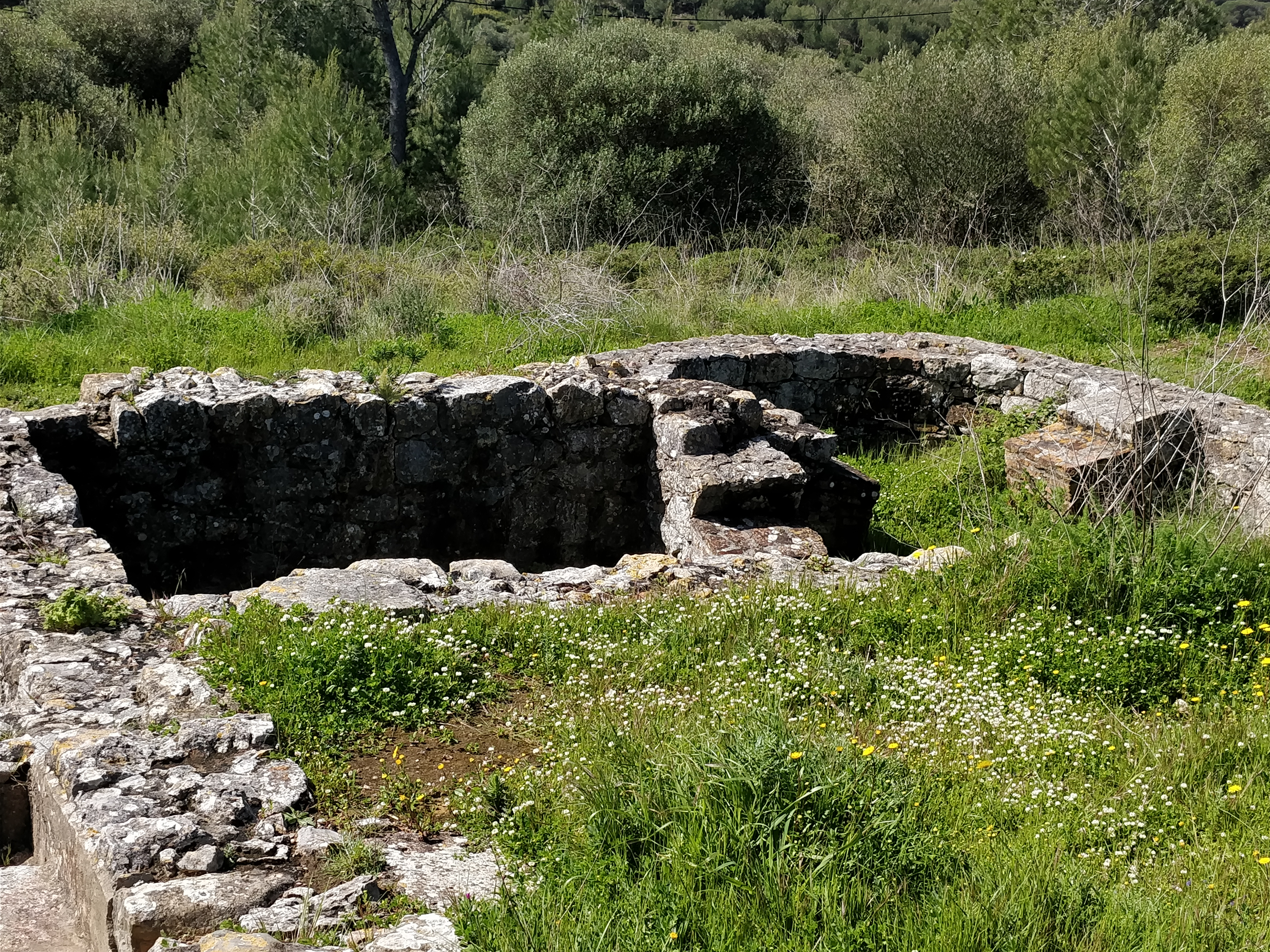
- Interactive map of Roman ruins of Casais Velhos
- 38°43′34″N 9°27′51″W
- Type: Ruins
- Location: Lisbon, Greater Lisbon, Lisbon, Portugal

Site notes
- Owner: Portuguese Republic
- Public access: Private Areias, off the Guincho/Areia-Rua de São Rafael roadway, before camp ground

The Roman ruins of Casais Velhos are the remains of a Roman town, in the municipality of Cascais, Lisbon District, Portugal that included baths, two cemeteries, remains of a wall and ceramic artifacts.

== History ==
The villa is believed to have been constructed in the 2nd century, while traces of a wall and a turret suggest a defensive fortification during antiquity.

In addition to ceramic and metal artifacts, coins were also found dating between 205 and 450 A.D., suggesting a more intense occupation during the final era of the Roman Empire.

The discovery of tanks and compartments with a quantity of murex shells has led some archaeologists to assume that people in this site were involved in the dying industry as murex shells were used to produce Tyrian purple dyes. After treatment, the purple would be transported to Olisipo and from there to Rome.

The site had already been known for some time when investigators Afonso do Paço (1895–1968) and Fausto de Figueiredo began their first excavations in the first half of the 20th century. Since then, the only other archaeological investigations were between 1968 and 1971, carried out by António de Castelo Branco and Octávio Reinaldo da Veiga Ferreira, who excavated the conduit supplying the baths, as well as a reservoir and bath.

== Architecture ==
The site is located in a rural environment, situated on a hill overlooking the Cresmina Dune, in the midst of woods that stretch north of the village of Areia.

The Roman villa comprises structures that includes an upper-class domus with a vestibule; a bath complex with three semi-circular baths, consisting of a frigidarium (cold baths), a warm room and a transitional praefurnium (used for heating the air that circulated under the floor); and an aqueduct that supplied water to the tanks. A larger tank, possibly a natatio, was also identified.

In the upper portion of the villa, several spaces were discovered, along with two tubs with airtight lids. Two silos covered with circular slabs and carved into the rock were identified, while two cemeteries were also discovered.

The excavation of the necropolis yielded a vast collection of ceramic vessels, jewellery, weapons and coins, the latter attributed to Constantius II(c.317–361), Constans (c.?–350), Theodosius I (c.346–395), Constantine the Great (c.271–337) and Arcadius (c.377–408), suggesting a more permanent occupation.

== Sources ==
- Encarnação, José Manuel dos Santos (1968), Notas sobre alguns vestígios romanos no concelho de Cascais (in Portuguese), Estoril, Portugal
- Cardoso, Guilherme (1986), Cascais no tempo dos romanos (Exposição) (in Portuguese), Cascais, Portugal
- Cardoso, Guilherme (1986), Roteiros da Arqueologia Portuguesa. 1-Lisboa e Arredores (in Portuguese), Cascais, Portugal
