= Fountain of Armés =

- Fonte de Armés
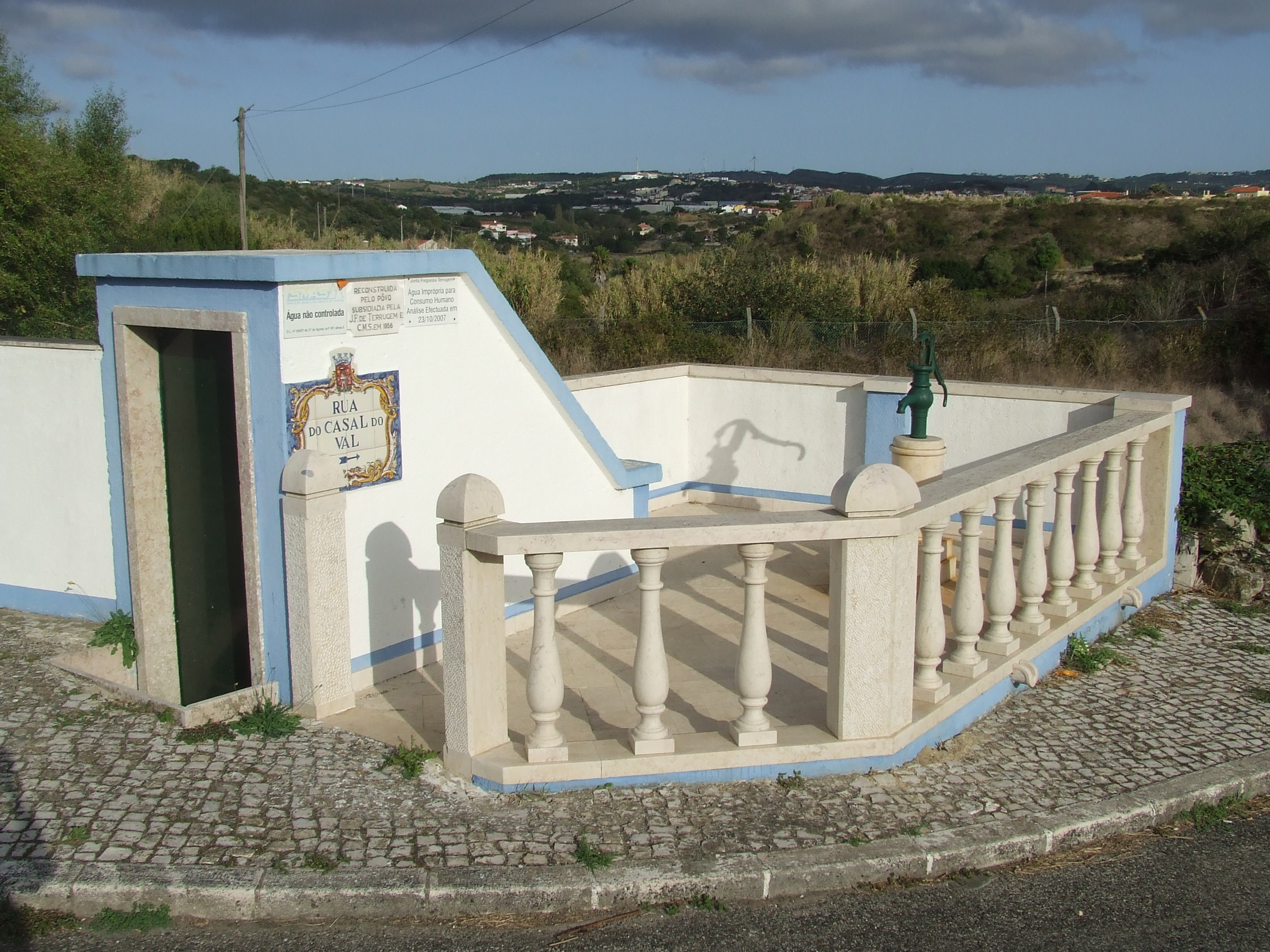
- Year: 1st century
- Medium: Marble Fountain
- Location: Sintra, Portugal
- 38°51′0.58″N 9°20′34.94″W
- Owner: Câmara Municipal de Sintra

The Fountain of Armés (Portuguese: Fonte de Armés), alternatively called the Fountain of the Moors (Portuguese: Fonte dos Mouros), is a 1st-century fountain built by Lucius Iulius Maelo Caudicus, an Olisipo flamen, to honour the Roman Emperor Augustus, in the village of Armés, civil parish of Terrugem in Sintra.

== History ==
It is suggested that the tank and fountain were constructed in the 1st century A.D.

Recent analysis by Cardim Ribeiro suggests that the inscription was altered in relation to its original position, in order to facilitate access to the tank. Even today, the fountain continues to be used.

== Architecture ==
Located in an urban environment, the fountain is located three metres below the actual level of the ground, decorating the southern wall section and covered by a slab of concrete, and accessible from a staircase.

The rectangular fountain, 213 centimetres by 231 centimetres in height, is formed from various slabs of granite in a square form with overhang inscribed in Latin. The Latin inscription reads: "L. I V L I V S. M A E L O. C A V D I C. F L A M. D I V I. A V G D S F", translated as "Lucius Iulius Maelo Caudicus, flamen of the Divine Augustus, made this (monument) at his own expense".

The part of the left lateral wall is a thicker, broader and irregular slab, seemingly primitive in origin. The ends of the lateral walls have been warn from over use. A subterranean conduit, which ends in a circular hole near the right edge of the posterior wall, 85 centimetres from the bottom, brings water to the tank. It has been modernized to include a manual pump to force water to the tank.
