= Castellum Mattiacorum =

Roman military fort in Mainz-Kastel, Wiesbaden, Germany

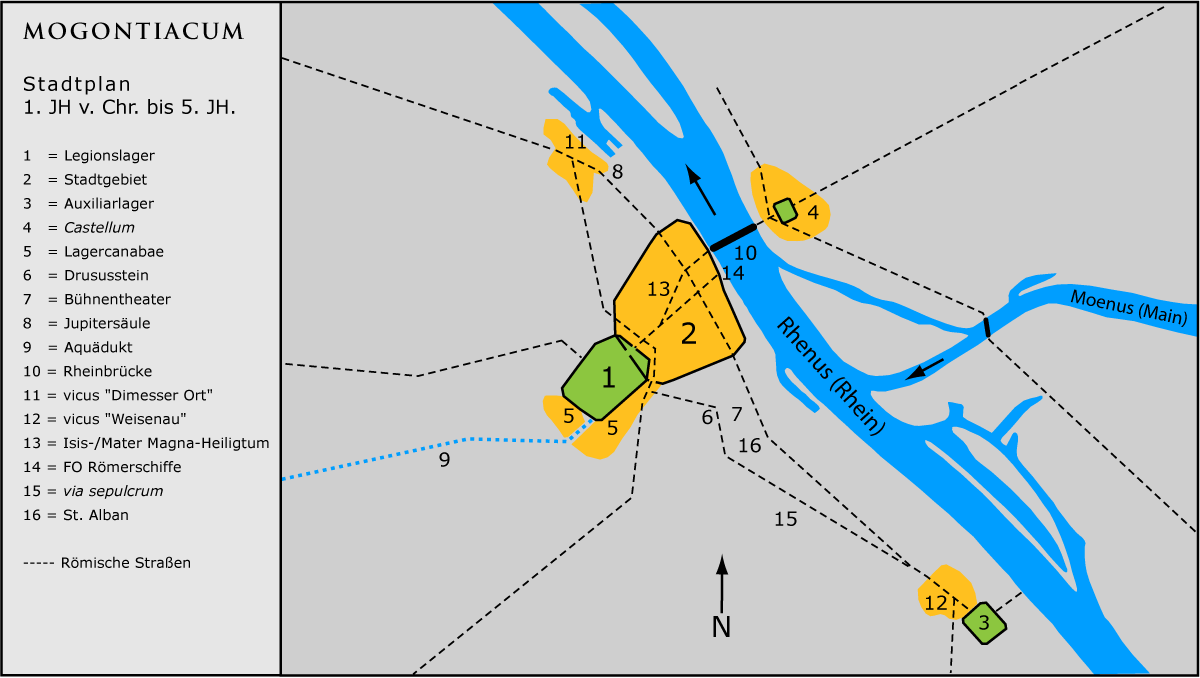
Map of Mogontiacum and Castellum (= No. 4)

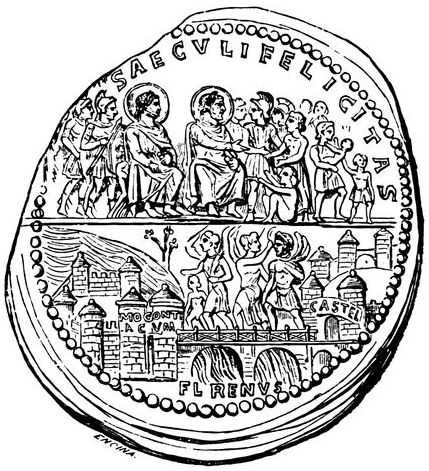
Lyon lead medallion depicting Mogontiacum and Castellum

The Castellum Mattiacorum (Latin for "Fort in the Land of the Mattiaci") was a Roman military camp in Mainz-Kastel, Wiesbaden. The ancient name was attested by several inscriptions.

The multiphase camp was located near the present-day Catholic Church of St. George. It was established around 11 BC when the Romans from Mogontiacum (modern Mainz) built a Bridge (initially a provisional pontoon bridge) over the Rhine, and secured the right-bank bridgehead with a fort. The backdrop was the expansion efforts of Drusus into the territory of unconquered Germania.

Near the fort stood a triumphal arch, whose foundation was excavated in 1986. Whether it was the triumphal arch known from other sources dedicated to the deceased Germanicus or a monument from the Domitian period is debated.

The early fort, built from earth and timber, is not yet archaeologically confirmed. It was likely destroyed in AD 69 and replaced in AD 71 by a stone fort measuring 71 × 98 meters. The fort was situated directly on the axis of the Roman bridge. The duration of occupation of the stone fort is unknown, though it was possibly abandoned by the early 2nd century as the Civitas Mattiacorum emerged. Adjoining the fort directly to the northeast was a camp village (vicus), which spanned about 250 meters east-west and 500 meters north-south. In the 3rd century, the vicus was surrounded by a protective wall. Around AD 300, the bridgehead was further fortified, a situation depicted on the Bleimedaillon von Lyon. According to its legend, it illustrates Mogontiacum and Castellum, connected by an arch bridge, with the Fluvius Rhenus (Rhine) between them.

Northeast of the vicus area, additional Roman fortifications were identified through aerial photography. These are temporary marching camps from the 1st and 2nd centuries, one of which was excavated in summer 2009. The camp was approximately 1.5 kilometers from the bridgehead fort. It dates to the second half of the 2nd century, measuring 75 × 60 meters, with rounded corners (playing-card shape) and four gates.

A treasure hoard, likely dating to the early 5th century, consists of over 750 coins discovered in a handled jug during a water pipeline trench excavation. Alongside the coins, the findings include three rings (one with rune-like markings) and other silver objects, primarily fittings.

== Bibliography ==
- R.-Alföldi, Maria; Dieter, Quast (2018). Der spätantike Schatzfund von Mainz-Kastel. Fremde Krieger am Rhein [The late antique treasure find from Mainz-Kastel: Foreign warriors on the Rhine]. (Studien zu Fundmünzen der Antike, Band 16) (in German). Bonn: Habelt. ISBN 978-3-7749-4139-7.
- Baatz, Dietwulf (1982). "Kastel". In Herrmann, Fritz- Rudolf; Baatz, Dietwulf (eds.). Die Römer in Hessen [The Romans in Hesse] (in German). Stuttgart: Theiss. pp. 369–372. ISBN 3-8062-0267-2.
- Becker, Jacob (1863). "Castellum Mattiacorum. Das römische Castel" [Castellum Mattiacorum: The Roman Castel]. Sonderabdruck aus den Annalen des Vereins für nassauische Alterthumskunde und Geschichtsforschung (in German). 7 (1).
- Max Ihm: "Castellum 10" (in German). In: Realencyclopädie der classischen Altertumswissenschaft (RE). Vol. III, 2, Stuttgart, 1893ff., col. 1758 f. (Original: https://ia902808.us.archive.org/2/items/PWRE05-06/Pauly-Wissowa_III2_1757.png).
