= Roman villa of Quinta da Bolacha =

- Interactive map of Roman villa of Quinta da Bolacha
- 38.76314°N 9.2273688°W
- Type: Ruins
- Location: Lisbon, Greater Lisbon, Lisbon, Portugal

Site notes
- Archaeologists: unknown
- Owner: Portuguese Republic
- Public access: Public Estrada dos Salgados

The Roman villa of Quinta da Bolacha (Portuguese: Vila Romana de Quinta da Bolacha) is a Roman villa in the civil parish of Falagueira-Venda Nova, municipality of Amadora, with an occupation dating from the 3rd and 4th century. It is commonly associated with the nearby Roman aqueduct, as well as the agricultural activities and Chalcedony mining occurring in the district.

== History ==
With vestiges of human occupation dating to the Paleolithic, the largest concentration of archeological sites identified with the Neolithic. The region was sought by different groups for its hunting, supported by its watercourses. Its first settlers were also attracted to the fertile lands and its distance from Felicitas Julia Olissipo (Lisbon). The villa was constructed sometime during the Roman occupation of the Iberian peninsula.

The municipality was always important to archeologists; in the second quarter of the 20th century, pioneers in Portuguese archeology were common in the region, including university professor Manuel Heleno (director of the Museum Dr. José Leite de Vasconcellos), who was a figure of reference in ethnographic studies and archeology.

Discovered at the end of the 1970s, during prospecting associated with the course of the Roman aqueduct that supported the ancient city of Lisbon.

On 19 November 2000, the Associação de Arqueologia da Amadora (Amadora Archaeological Association) proposed that the village be classified as national patrimony, which supported by the IIPA on 1 October 2001 and nine days later a process was opened by the vice-president of the IPPAR.

On 27 July 2009, a proposal was issued by the DRCLVTejo for the classification of the property as an Imóvel de Interesse Público (Property of Public Interest), that fixed it in the complementary Special Protection Zone. But, the DRCLVTejo issued a later proposal over the restrictions applied (on 14 November 2011), resulting in its requalification on 6 January 2012. These proposals were approved on 23 January of the following year by the Conselho Nacional de Cultura (National Council for Culture). On 11 October the project was published in a decision that classified the villa as Sítio de Interesse Público (Site of Public Interest) and fixed it within the respect Special Protection Zone, in the declaration 13546/2012 (Diário da Reoública, Série 2, 197).

== Architecture ==
Surveys were undertaken at the beginning of the following decade, resulting in the identification of various structures, including impermeable mortar tank plastered with lime, sand and tile.

The work in the locale was discontinued, owing to various reasons, but resulted in the collection of architectonic elements, such as tegulae (rectangular roof tiles) and imbrices (overlapping roof tile). There were also artefacts exhumed that constituted the residential area, as opposed to the mainly agricultural area around the complex. This interpretation was reinforced by the stucco walls, and quality of excavated materials (such as glasses, bowls and ceramics, like the pots and pans discovered).

Of special note was the discovery of fragments of South Galacian, Hispânica and African terra sigillata (the last being the majority) confirming the sites Roman descendancy.

== See also ==
- Olisipo
