= São João das Lampas =

- Civil parish
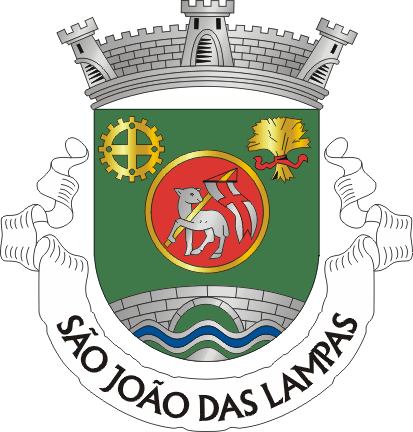
- Coat of arms

- Location in Portugal
- Coordinates: 38.870°N 9.421°W
- Country: Portugal
- Region: Lisbon
- Metropolitan area: Lisbon
- District: Lisbon
- Municipality: Sintra
- Disbanded: 2013

Area
  - Total: 57.50 km^{2} (22.20 sq mi)

Population (2011)
  - Total: 11,392
  - Density: 200/km^{2} (510/sq mi)
- Time zone: UTC+00:00 (WET)
  - Summer (DST): UTC+01:00 (WEST)

São João das Lampas (Portuguese pronunciation: [sɐ̃w ʒuˈɐ̃w dɐʒ ˈlɐ̃pɐʃ]) is a former civil parish in the municipality of Sintra, Lisbon District, Portugal. In 2013, the parish merged into the new parish São João das Lampas e Terrugem. The population in 2011 was 11,392, in an area of 57.50 km².
