= Archaeological Museum of São Miguel de Odrinhas =

Museum in Portugal

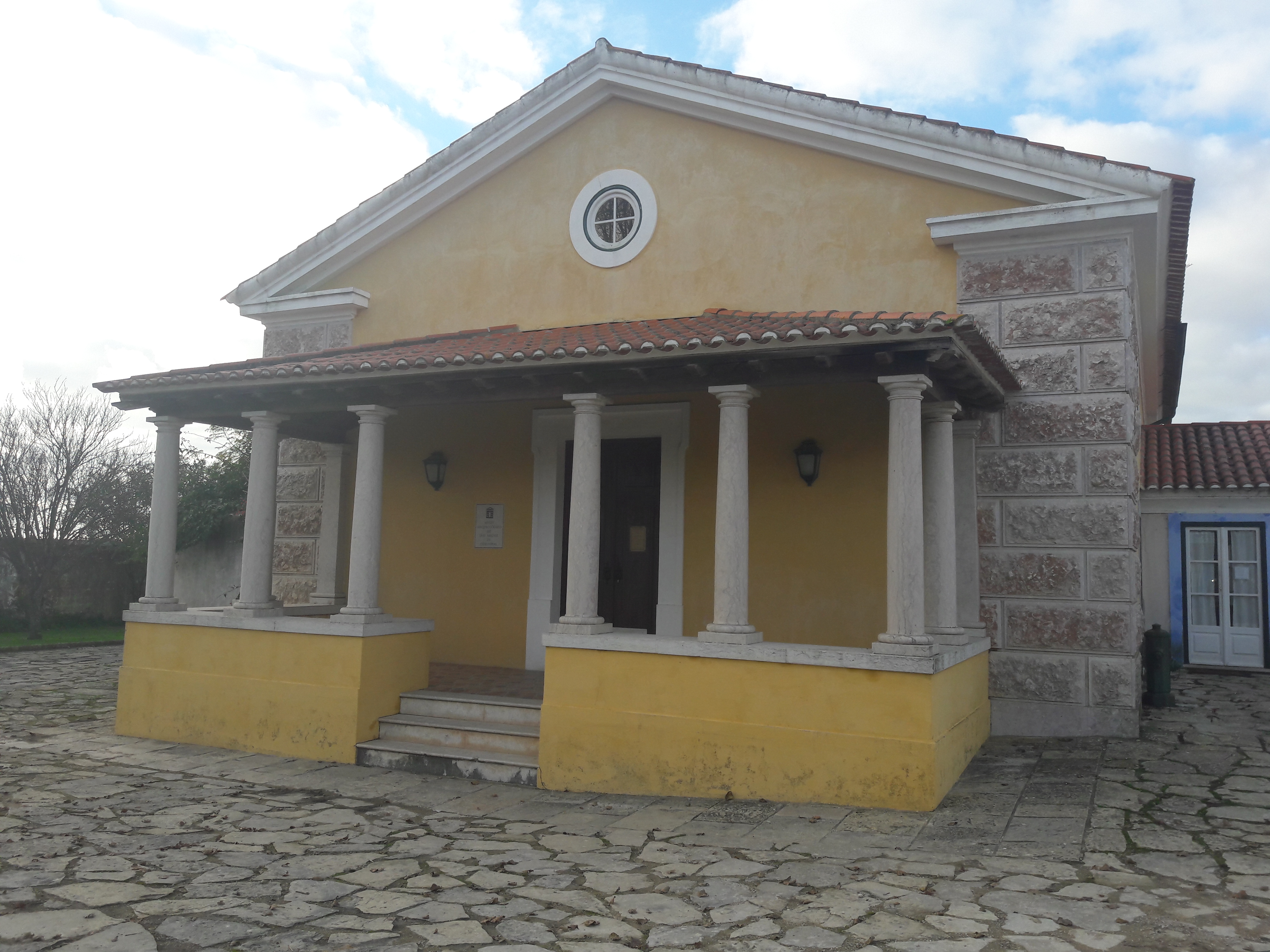

- Location within Portugal
- Established: 1955; 71 years ago
- Location: Odrinhas, Sintra
- Coordinates: 38.8871°N 9.3663°W
- Website: http://museuarqueologicodeodrinhas.cm-sintra.pt/default_en.php

The Archaeological Museum of São Miguel de Odrinhas in Sintra municipality, Lisbon District, Portugal owes its existence to the collection by the Hermitage of São Miguel of epigraphic stones found amongst the Roman ruins in the neighbourhood. Around the year 30 B.C. Olisipo (Roman Lisbon) received from Augustus the status that allowed it to combine Roman law with its own ancient laws, thus permitting full integration into the Roman Empire. Most of its important families lived outside Lisbon in villas and many of the estates were located in the Sintra area. In 1955, Sintra Town Council first proposed the construction of a small museum to bring together in Odrinhas the collection of the Hermitage, which had by then been dispersed, as well as items discovered more recently.

The museum, designed by Alberto Castro Nunes and António Maria Braga, winners of the Rafael Manzano Prize for New Traditional Architecture, in collaboration with Léon Krier, was inaugurated in 1999. It contains many engraved and carved stones discovered locally, displaying a variety of influences including Paleohispanic, Roman, Visigoth, and Oriental. Non-local items include three Etruscan tombs, the only such tombs in Portugal, which were originally brought from Italy and were placed in the gardens of Monserrate Palace in Sintra for use as garden ornaments.

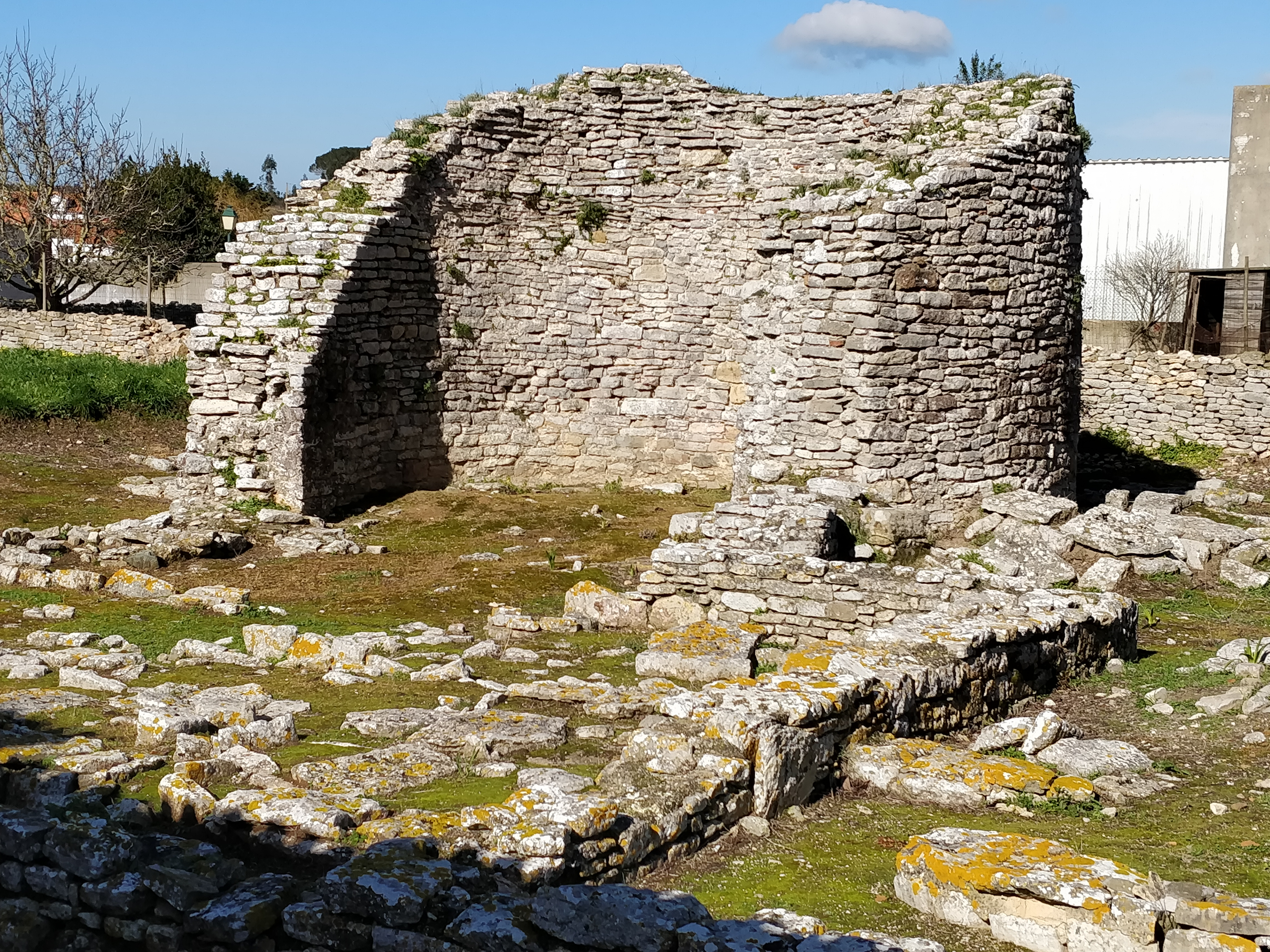
Remains of a Roman villa in the grounds of the museum

== See also ==
- Olisipo
- Archaeological Site of Alto da Vigia
