= Imbrex and tegula =

Overlapping roof tiles used in ancient Greek and Roman architecture

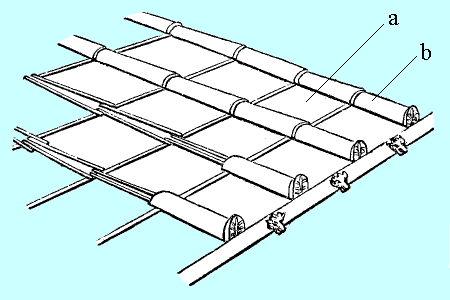
The bottom of each tegula (a) overlaps the top of the tile below it. At the same time, the upper tegula's raised side borders taper inward to nestle between the side borders of the tegula below. Each curved imbrex (b) covers the joints formed between the side ridges of adjacent tegulae. Some imbrices are not shown in order to reveal the details of the tegular joints.

The imbrex and tegula (pl.: imbrices and tegulae) were overlapping roof tiles used in ancient Greek and Roman architecture as a waterproof and durable roof covering. They were made predominantly of fired clay, but also sometimes of marble, bronze or gilt. In Rome, they replaced wooden shingles, and were used on almost every type of structure, from humble outbuildings to grand temples and public facilities.

The tegula (Greek solenes) was a plain flat tile, or a flat tile with raised edges, which was laid flat upon the roof, while the imbrex (Greek kalupter) was a semi-cylindrical roofing tile, like a half-pipe, laid over the joints between the tegulae. When well-made and properly imbricated (overlapped), there was little need for further waterproofing or sealant.

The roofing area was generally surrounded by antefixae, which were often decorated and had several decorative anthemia to cover each end row imbrex.

The concept of imbrex and tegula roofing in pitched roof construction is still in use today as an international feature of style and design, and is the origin of the term imbrication for the condition of things arranged in overlapping layers.

== History and development ==
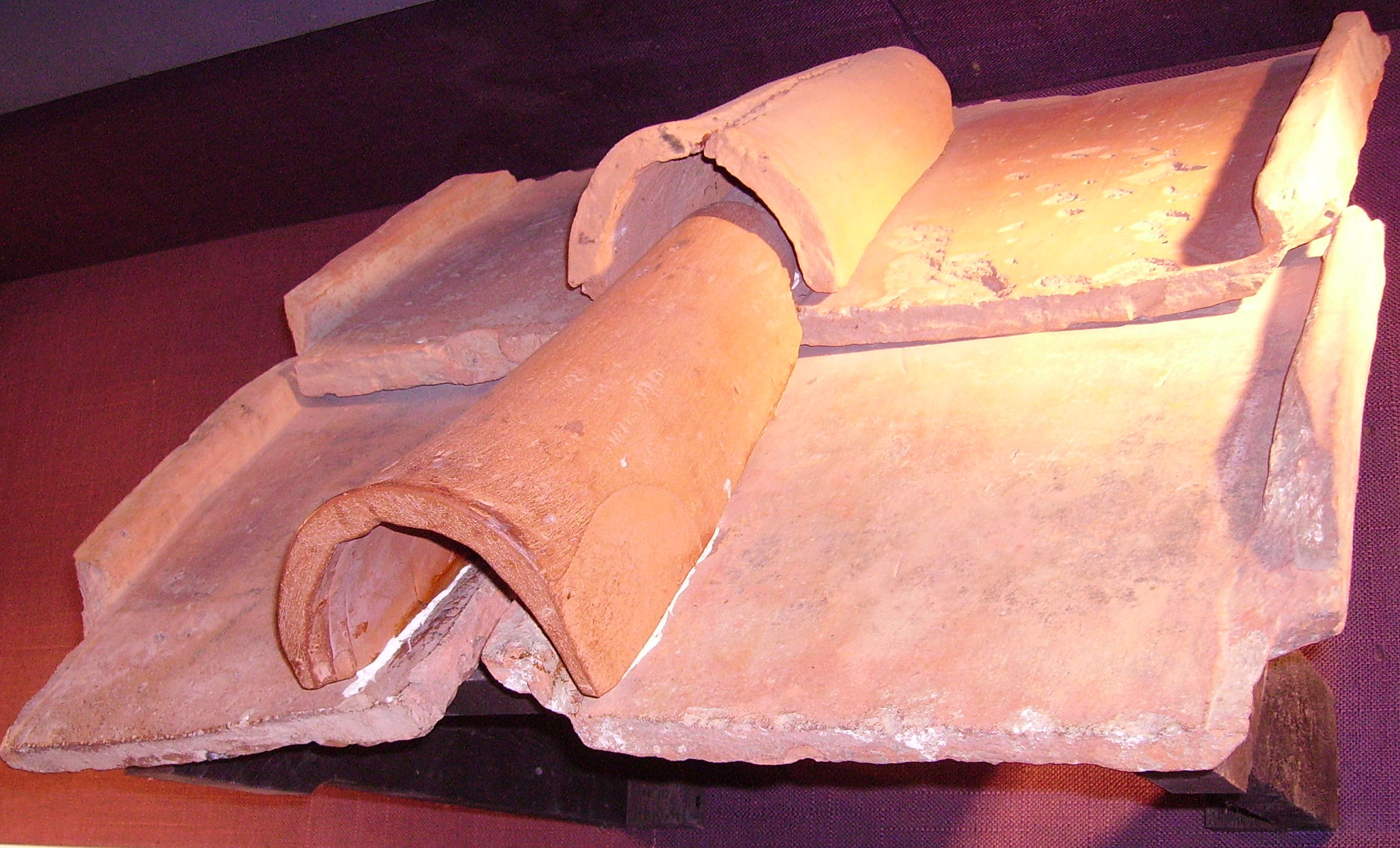
An example of the construct at Fishbourne Roman Palace museum

Imbrices and tegulae were first made by the Greeks. Like bricks, they were formed of wet clay in a four-sided mould, often shaped with a piece of wire, and then baked in an oven or kiln. More sophisticated moulds were developed over time.

Tegulae were originally made perfectly flat, or with nothing more than a ridge underneath the upper border, which allowed the tile to be "hung" upon a sloping roof so that it would not slide to the ground. Later, tegulae were formed with a raised border on the two vertical sides, which would channel rainwater to the bottom of the tile, rather than allowing it to seep between tiles to dampen the roofing materials. Another improvement occurred when these two raised borders were made to converge, forming a broad v-shaped trapezoid with the narrowest edge downwards, nestling into the widest part of the tile below it to form a continuous channel.

The imbrices completed the waterproofing of the roof by arching over the joints between the vertical edges of the tegulae, dividing the roof into channels. Rain water flowed off the curved imbrices into the channels and down over the surfaces of the tegulae, and descended into the gutter (canalis). In formal architecture the canalis had a plain or ornamented frontal piece set atop the entablature, immediately above the cornice. The semicircular opening at the front of the lowermost imbrex was often capped with an ornamental fronton, and the spouts which drained the gutters were frequently decorated with lions' heads (capita leonina) or other fantastic or grotesque faces.

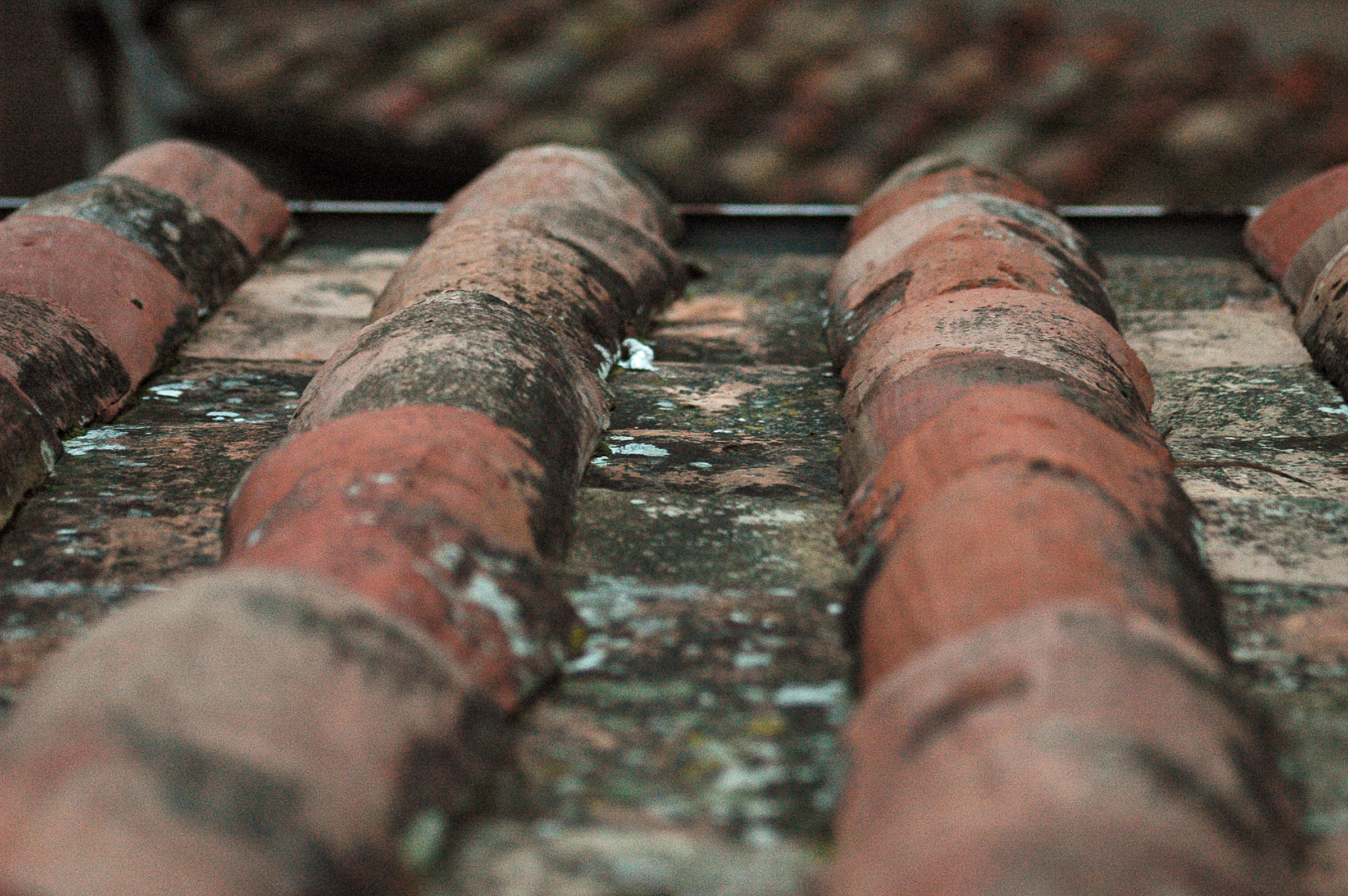
Imbrices and tegulae are still in use in Rome in 2005.

By Roman times many tiles were being made under the auspices of various Roman legions, and were imprinted with a stamp of the legion's insignia. Imbrices and tegulae are common finds in archaeological sites, and their design and markings can be of use in dating the sites and identifying the inhabitants. For instance, a 1993 archaeological dig in Merseyside in England uncovered over 300 kg (660 lb) of tile and kiln remains. Some of the tegulae were stamped with the "LXXVV" insigniae of the Legio XX Valeria Victrix. Romans also often recycled broken tiles by incorporating them into mortar.

Tiles of marble were first used around the year 620 BC. Besides the superior beauty and durability of the material, these tiles could be made of a much larger size than those of clay. Consequently, they were used in the construction of the greatest temples, such as the Temple of Zeus at Olympia, the Parthenon at Athens, and the Macellum of Pozzuoli. Still more expensive and magnificent tiles were made of bronze and gilt.

== Gallery ==
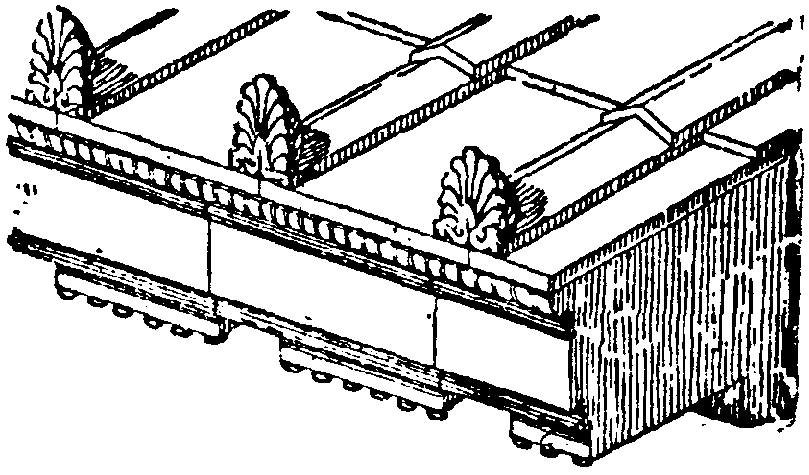
Diagram of roofing with antefixae

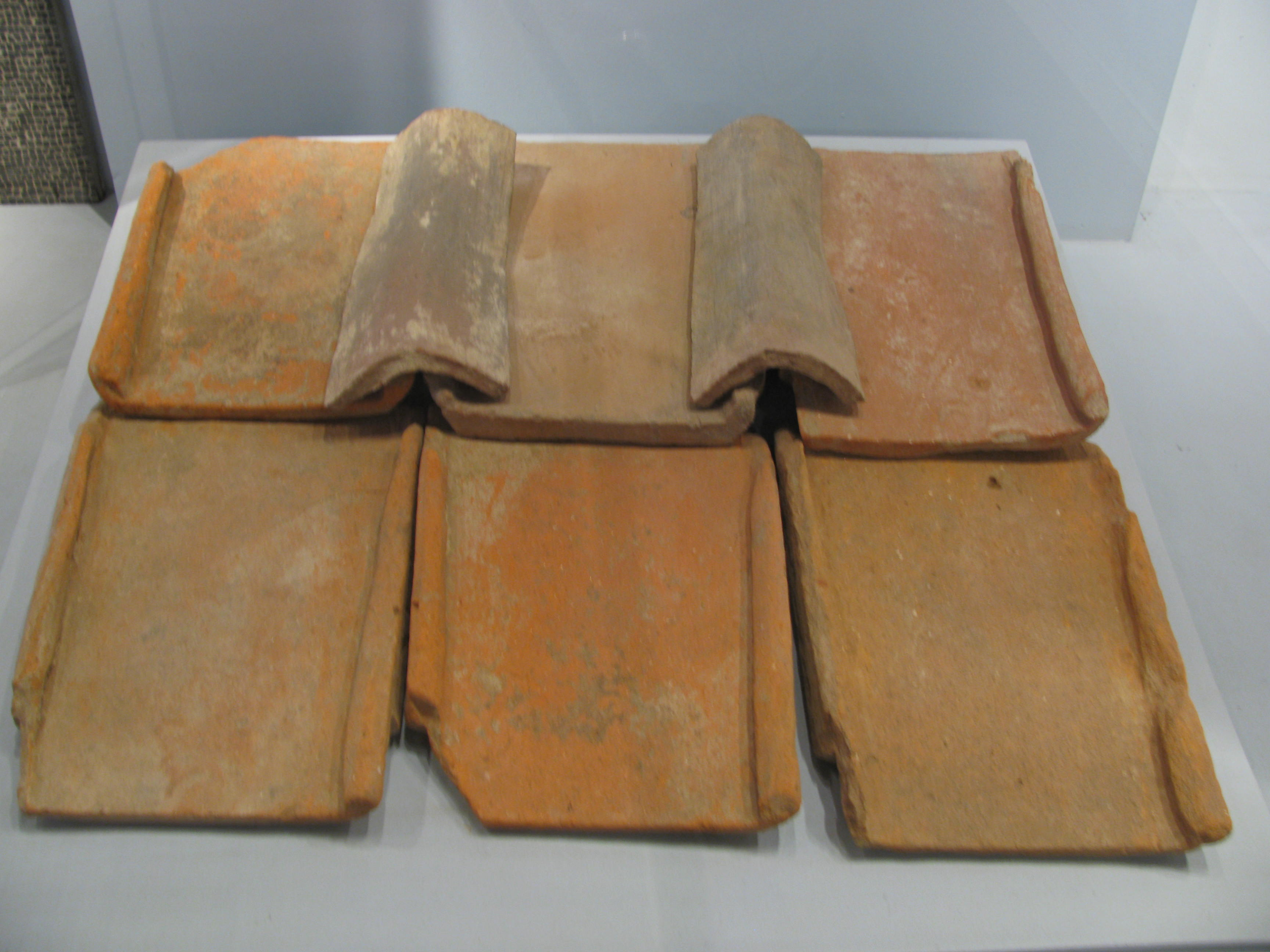
Gallo-Roman tegulae and imbrices - Museum of Feurs (France)

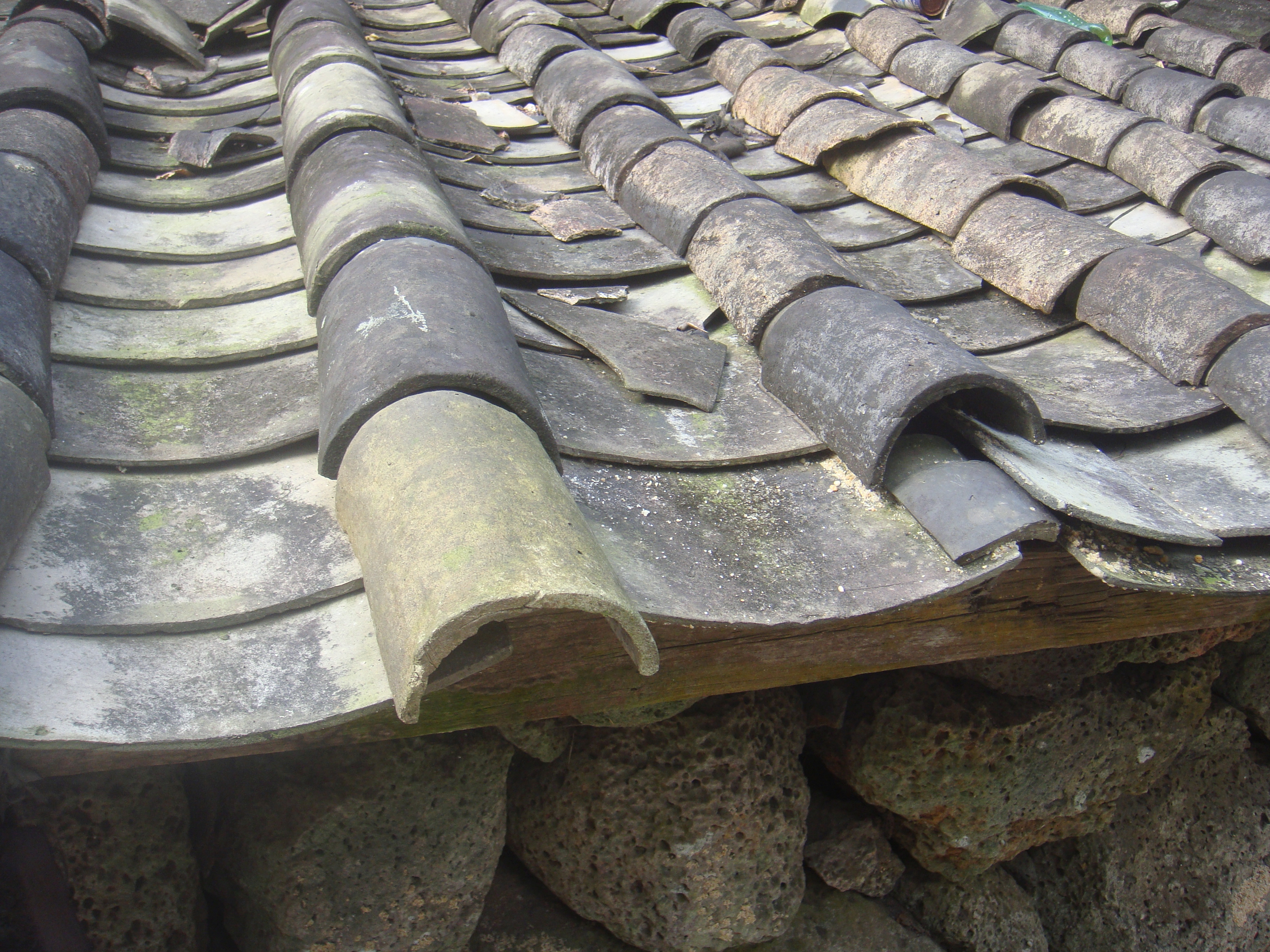
Imbrex and tegula style roof tiles are also used in other parts of the world. This is a roof in Hainan, China, with concave tegula.

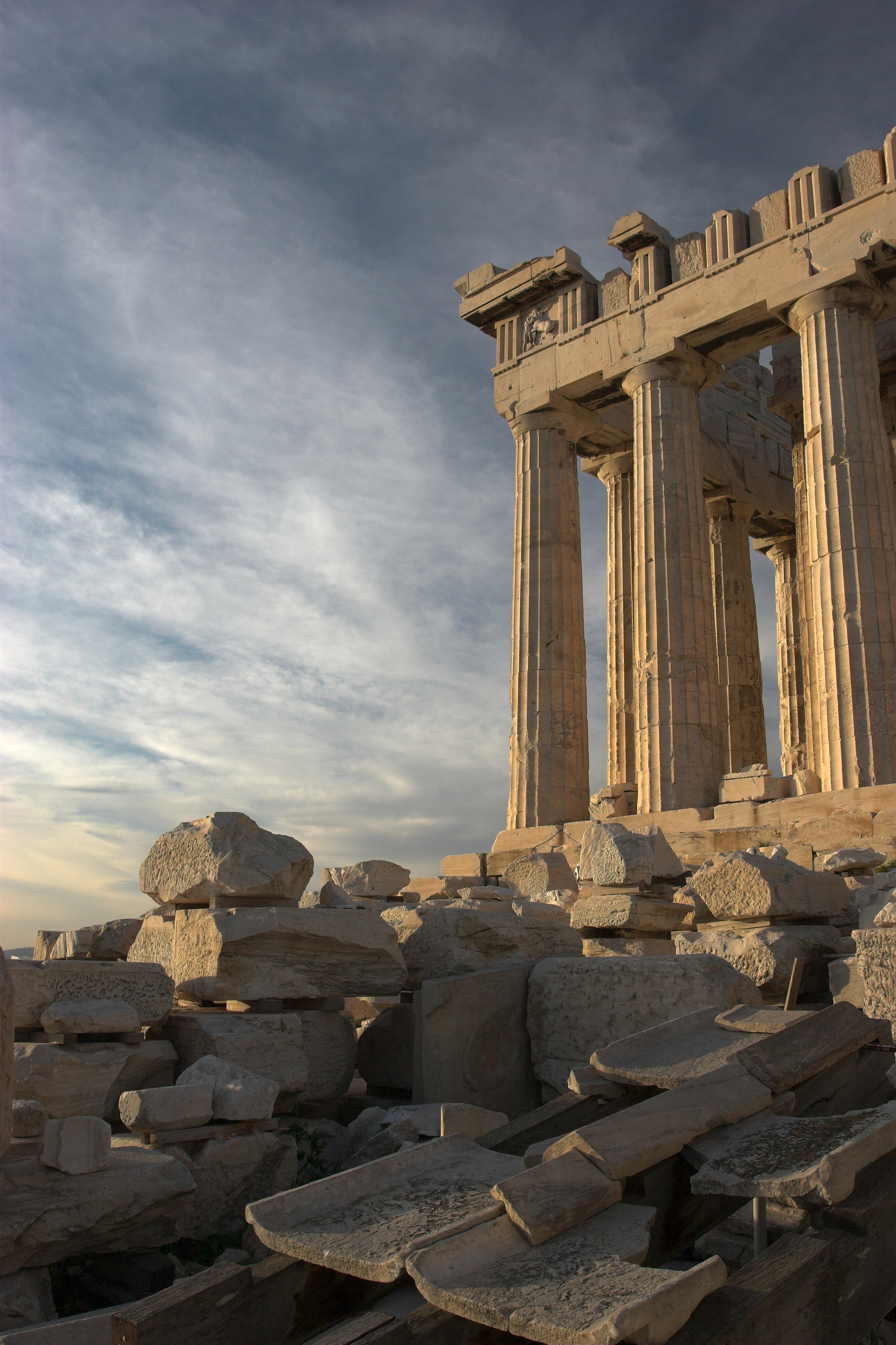
The Parthenon from the south. In the foreground of the image, a reconstruction of the marble imbrices and tegulae forming the roof is visible, resting on wooden supports.

== See also ==
- Ceramic building material – Archaeological term for baked clay building material
- Monk and Nun – Style of roof tiling using arched tiles in both layers
