= Frielas =

- Civil parish
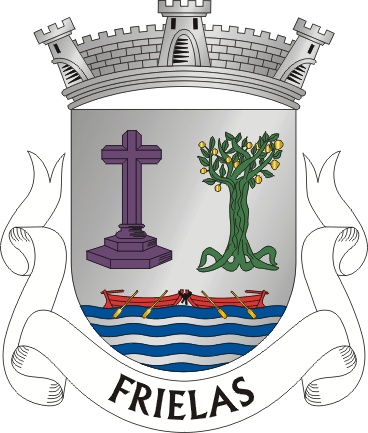
- Coat of arms

- Location in Portugal
- Coordinates: 38°49′33″N 09°08′40″W
- Country: Portugal
- Region: Lisbon
- Metropolitan area: Lisbon
- District: Lisbon
- Municipality: Loures
- Disbanded: 2013

Area
  - Total: 5.63 km^{2} (2.17 sq mi)

Population (2001)
  - Total: 2,676
  - Density: 480/km^{2} (1,200/sq mi)
- Time zone: UTC+00:00 (WET)
  - Summer (DST): UTC+01:00 (WEST)
- Postal code: 2670

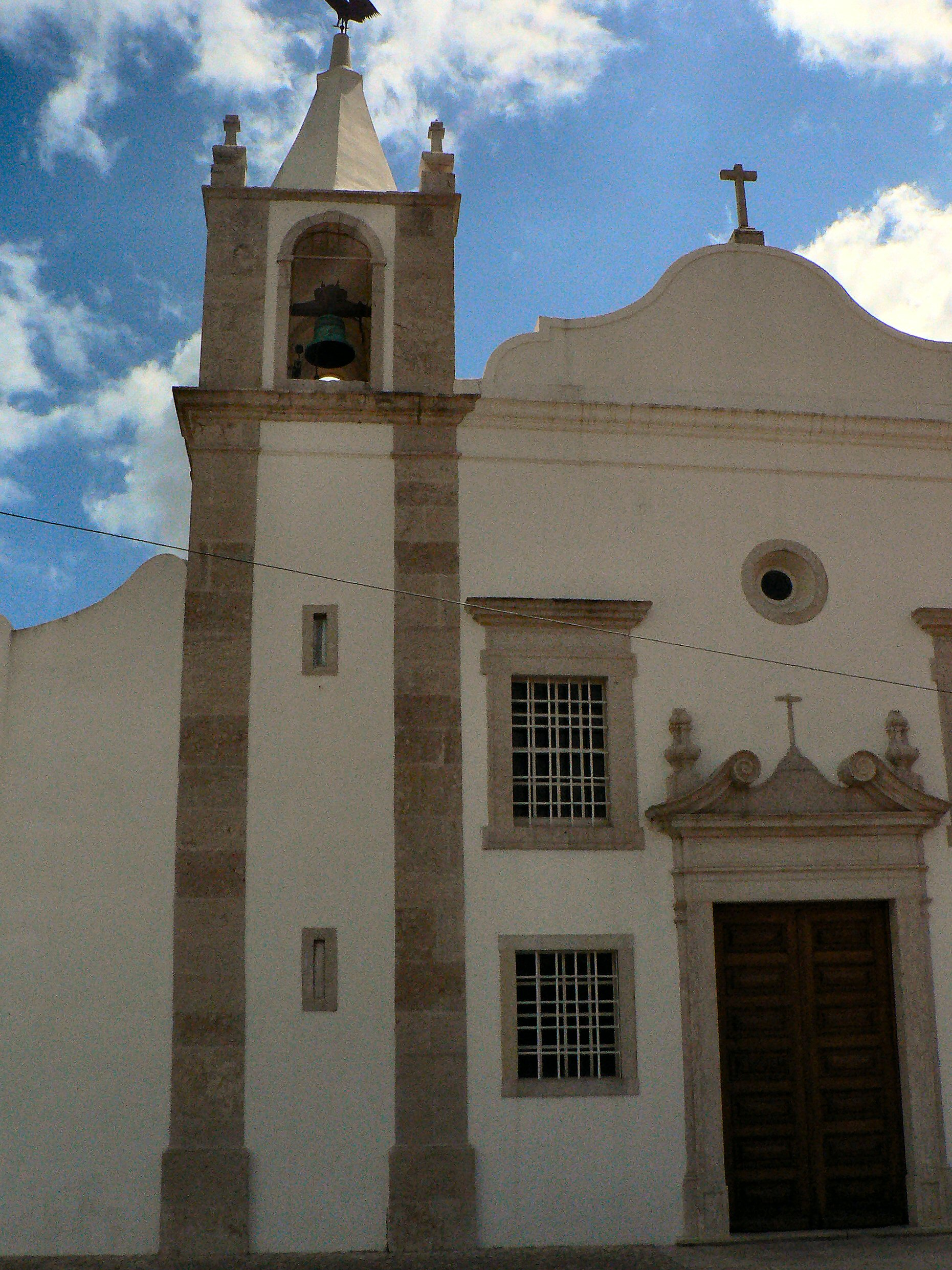

Frielas (Portuguese pronunciation: [fɾiˈɛlɐʃ]) is a former civil parish in the municipality of Loures, Lisbon District, Portugal. In 2013, the parish merged into the new parish Santo António dos Cavaleiros e Frielas. Frielas has an area of 5.63 km^{2}, 2676 inhabitants according to the census made in 2001 and a density of 475 inhabitants per km^{2}.
