= Queluz e Belas =

- Civil parish
- Location in Portugal
- Coordinates: 38.755°N 9.255°W
- Country: Portugal
- Region: Lisbon
- Metropolitan area: Lisbon
- District: Lisbon
- Municipality: Sintra

Area
  - Total: 26.47 km^{2} (10.22 sq mi)

Population (2011)
  - Total: 52,335
  - Density: 2,000/km^{2} (5,100/sq mi)
- Time zone: UTC+00:00 (WET)
  - Summer (DST): UTC+01:00 (WEST)

Queluz e Belas is a civil parish in the municipality of Sintra, Lisbon District, Portugal. It was formed in 2013 by the merger of the former parishes Queluz and Belas. The population in 2011 was 52,336, in an area of 26.47 km².
