= Sintra =

Municipality in the Lisbon Region, Portugal

- Municipality
- Town of Sintra
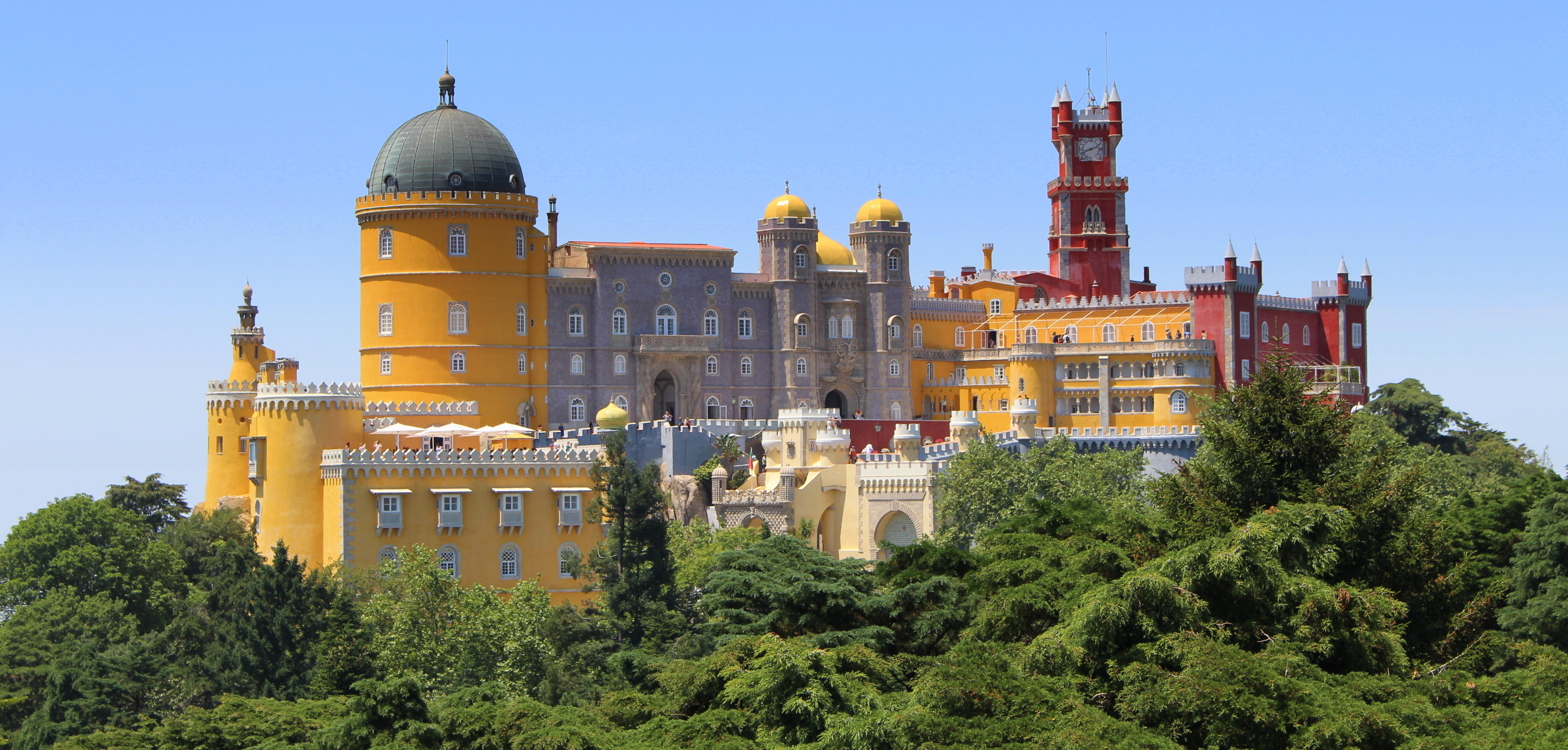
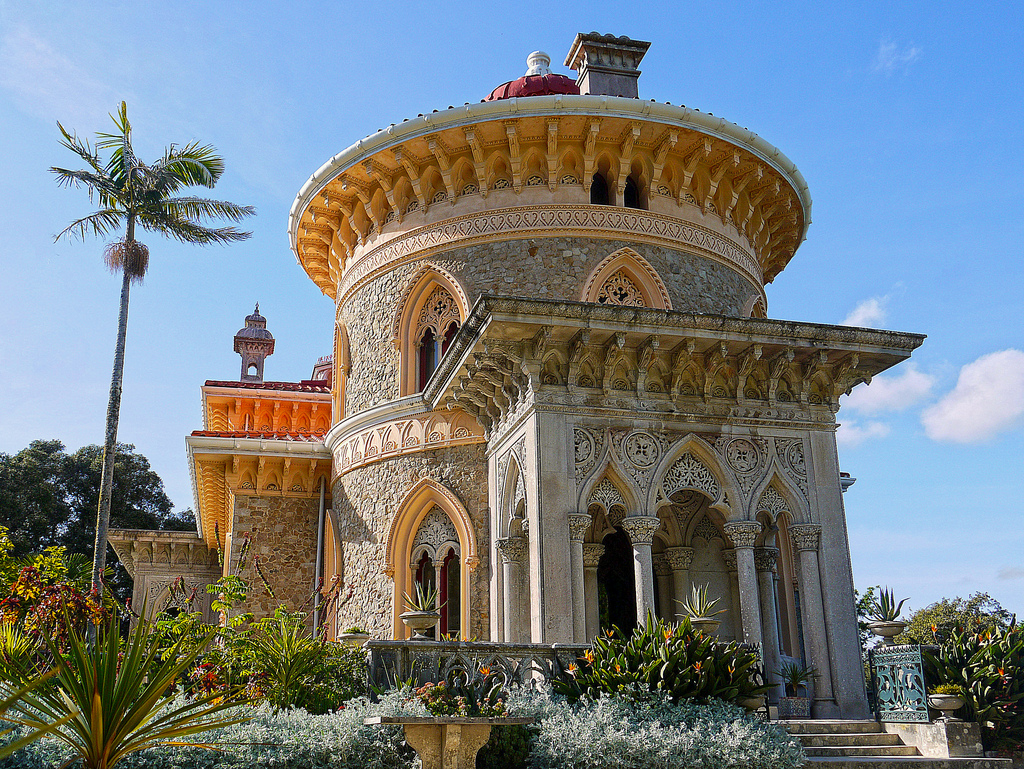
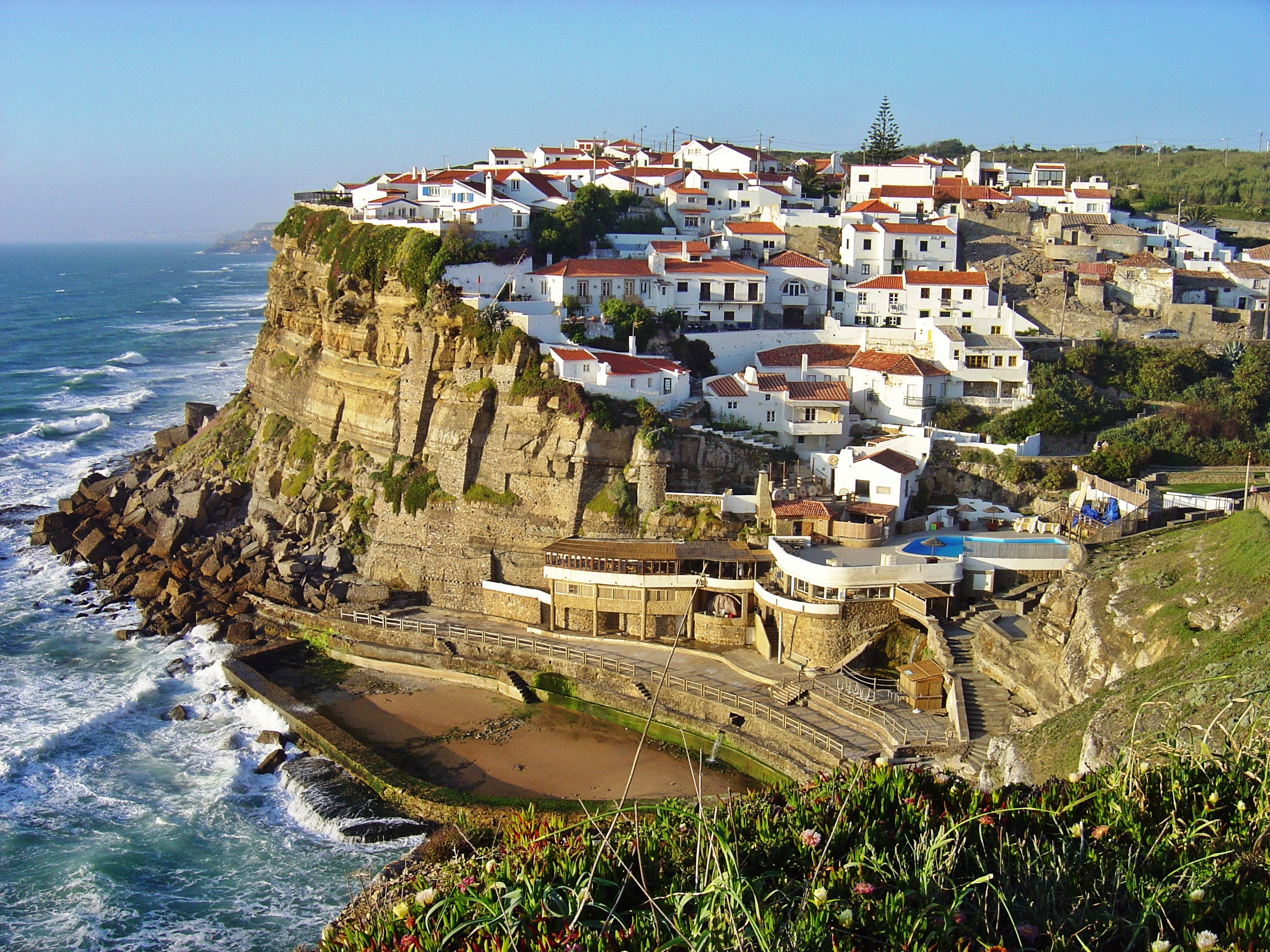
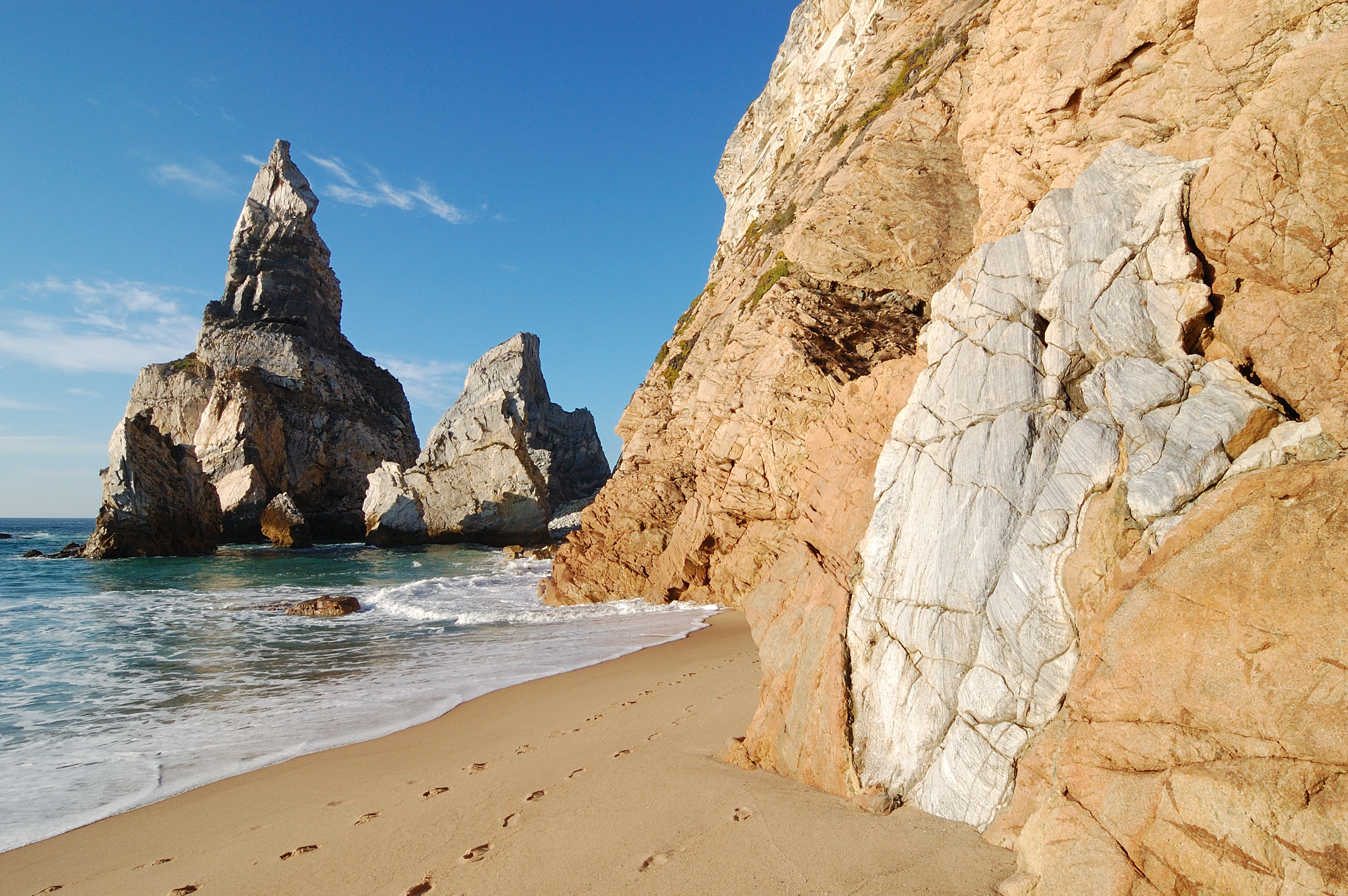
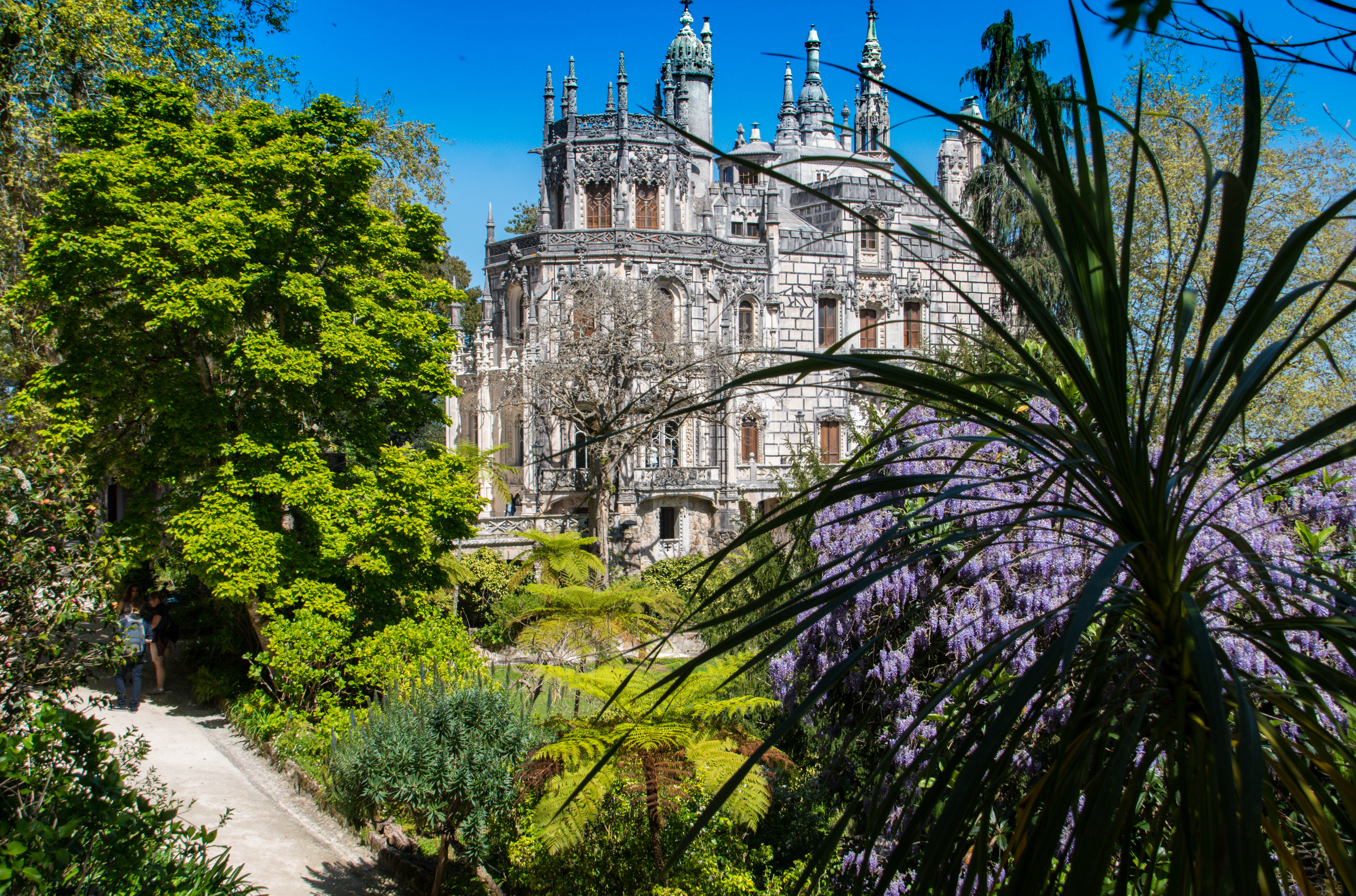
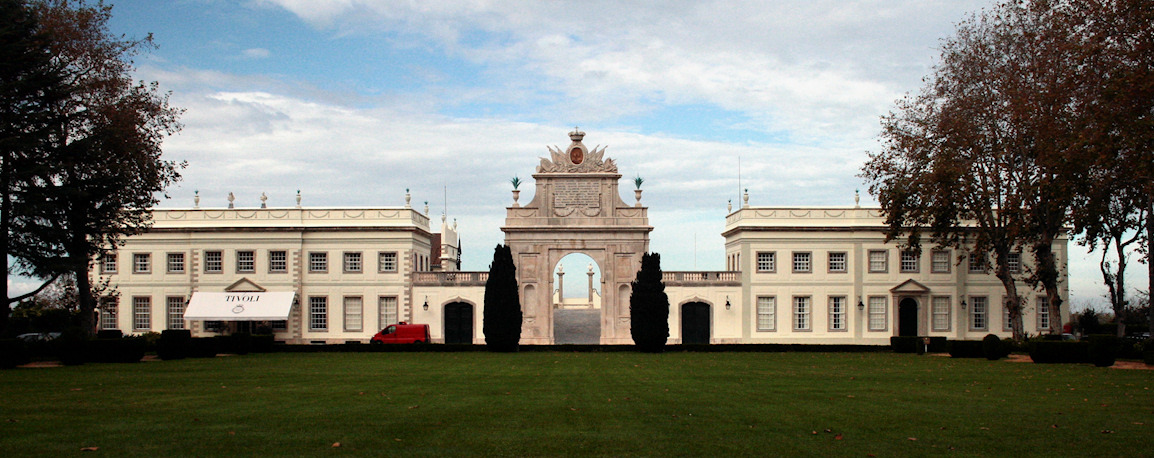
- Clockwise: Pena National Palace; Azenhas do Mar; Quinta da Regaleira; Seteais Palace; Praia da Ursa; Monserrate Palace.

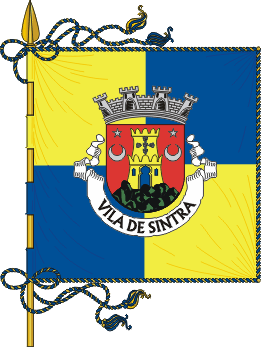
- Flag Coat of arms
- Interactive map of Sintra
- Location in Portugal Sintra (Europe)
- Coordinates: 38°47′57″N 9°23′18″W
- Country: Portugal
- Region: Lisbon
- Metropolitan area: Lisbon
- District: Lisbon
- Parishes: 11 (list)

Government
  - President: Marco Almeida (PSD)

Area
  - Total: 319.23 km^{2} (123.26 sq mi)
- Elevation: 175 m (574 ft)
- Lowest elevation: 0 m (0 ft)

Population (2011)
  - Total: 377,835
  - Density: 1,183.6/km^{2} (3,065.5/sq mi)
- Time zone: UTC+00:00 (WET)
  - Summer (DST): UTC+01:00 (WEST)
- Postal code: 2714
- Area code: 219
- Patron: São Pedro
- Website: http://www.cm-sintra.pt

UNESCO World Heritage Site
- Official name: Cultural Landscape of Sintra
- Criteria: Cultural: ii, iv, v
- Reference: 723
- Inscription: 1995 (19th Session)
- Area: 946 ha (2,340 acres)

Sintra (/ˈsɪntrə, ˈsiːntrə/, Portuguese: [ˈsĩtɾɐ]), officially the Town of Sintra (Portuguese: Vila de Sintra), is a town and municipality in the Greater Lisbon region of Portugal, located on the Portuguese Riviera. The population of the municipality in 2021 was 385,654, in an area of 319.23 square kilometres (123.26 sq mi). Sintra is one of the most urbanized and densely populated municipalities of Portugal. A major tourist destination famed for its picturesqueness, the municipality has several historic palaces, castles, scenic beaches, parks and gardens.

The area includes the Sintra-Cascais Nature Park through which the Sintra Mountains run. The historic center of the Vila de Sintra is famous for its 19th-century Romanticist architecture, historic estates and villas, gardens, and royal palaces and castles, which resulted in the classification of the town as a UNESCO World Heritage Site. Sintra's landmarks include the medieval Castle of the Moors, the romanticist Pena National Palace and the Portuguese Renaissance Sintra National Palace.

Sintra is one of the wealthiest municipalities in both Portugal and the Iberian Peninsula as a whole. It is home to one of the largest foreign expatriate communities along the Portuguese Riviera, and consistently ranks as one of the best places to live in Portugal. The ECB Forum on Central Banking, an annual event organised by the European Central Bank, is held in Sintra.

== History ==
=== Prehistory to Moorish era ===
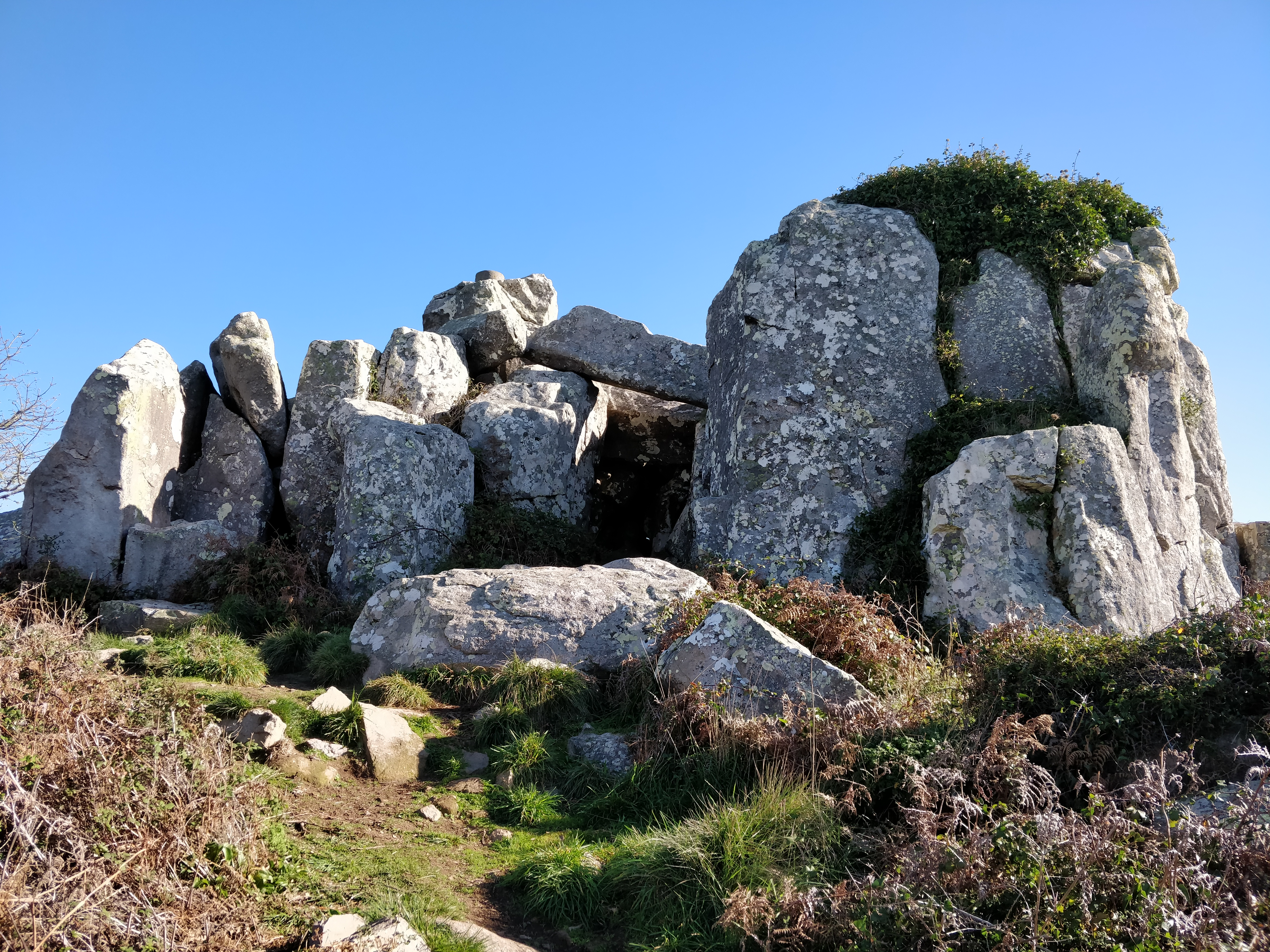
Anta de Adrenunes.

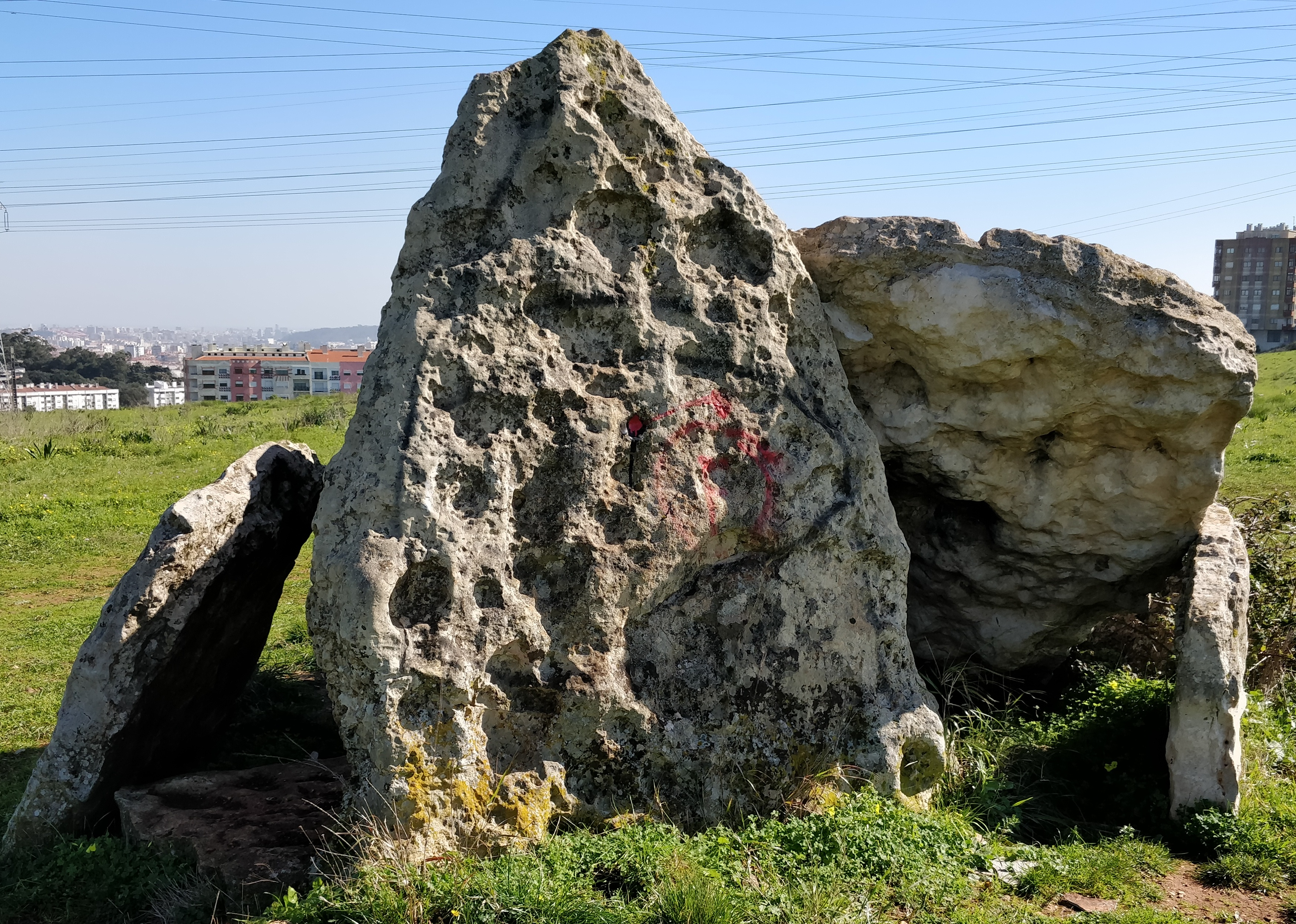
Anta do Monte Abraão.

The earliest remnants of human occupation were discovered in Penha Verde: these vestiges testify to an occupation dating to the early Paleolithic. Comparable remnants were discovered in an open-air site in São Pedro de Canaferrim, alongside the chapel of the Castelo dos Mouros (Moorish Castle), dating back to the Neolithic, and include decorated ceramics and microlithic flint utensils from the 5th millennium BC.

Ceramic fragments found locally including many late Chalcolithic vases from the Sintra mountains suggest that between the fourth and third millennia B.C. the region (adjacent to the present village of Sintra) was occupied by a Neolithic/Chalcolithic settlement, with characteristics comparable to fortified settlements in Lisbon and Setúbal. The evidence discovered in Quinta das Sequoias and São Pedro de Canaferrim contrasts dramatically with those remnants discovered in the walled town of Penha Verde and the funerary monument of Bella Vista. Traces of several Bronze Age remains were also discovered in many places in the Sintra Mountains, including alongside the town, in the Monte do Sereno area, and a late Bronze Age settlement within the Moorish Castle dating to the 9th–6th centuries B.C.

The most famous object from this period is the so-called Sintra Collar, a middle Bronze Age gold neck-ring found near the city at the end of the 19th century, which since 1900 has been part of the British Museum's collection. Relatively close by, in Santa Eufémia da Serra, is an Iron Age settlement where artifacts from indigenous tribes and peoples of Mediterranean origins (principally from the Punic period) were also discovered.

These date from the early 4th century B.C., prior to the Romanization of the peninsula, which in the area of Foz do Tejo took place in the middle of the 2nd century B.C. Close proximity to a large commercial centre (Olisipo) founded by the Turduli Oppidani people in the first half of the first millennium B.C., meant that the region of Sintra was influenced by human settlement throughout various epochs, cultures that have left remains in the area to this day. The toponym Sintra derives from the medieval Suntria, and points to an association with radical Indo-European cultures; the word translates as 'bright star' or 'sun', commonly significant in those cultures. Marcus Terentius Varro and Cadizian Lucius Junius Moderatus Columella designated the place "the sacred mountain" and Ptolemy referred to it as the "mountains of the moon".

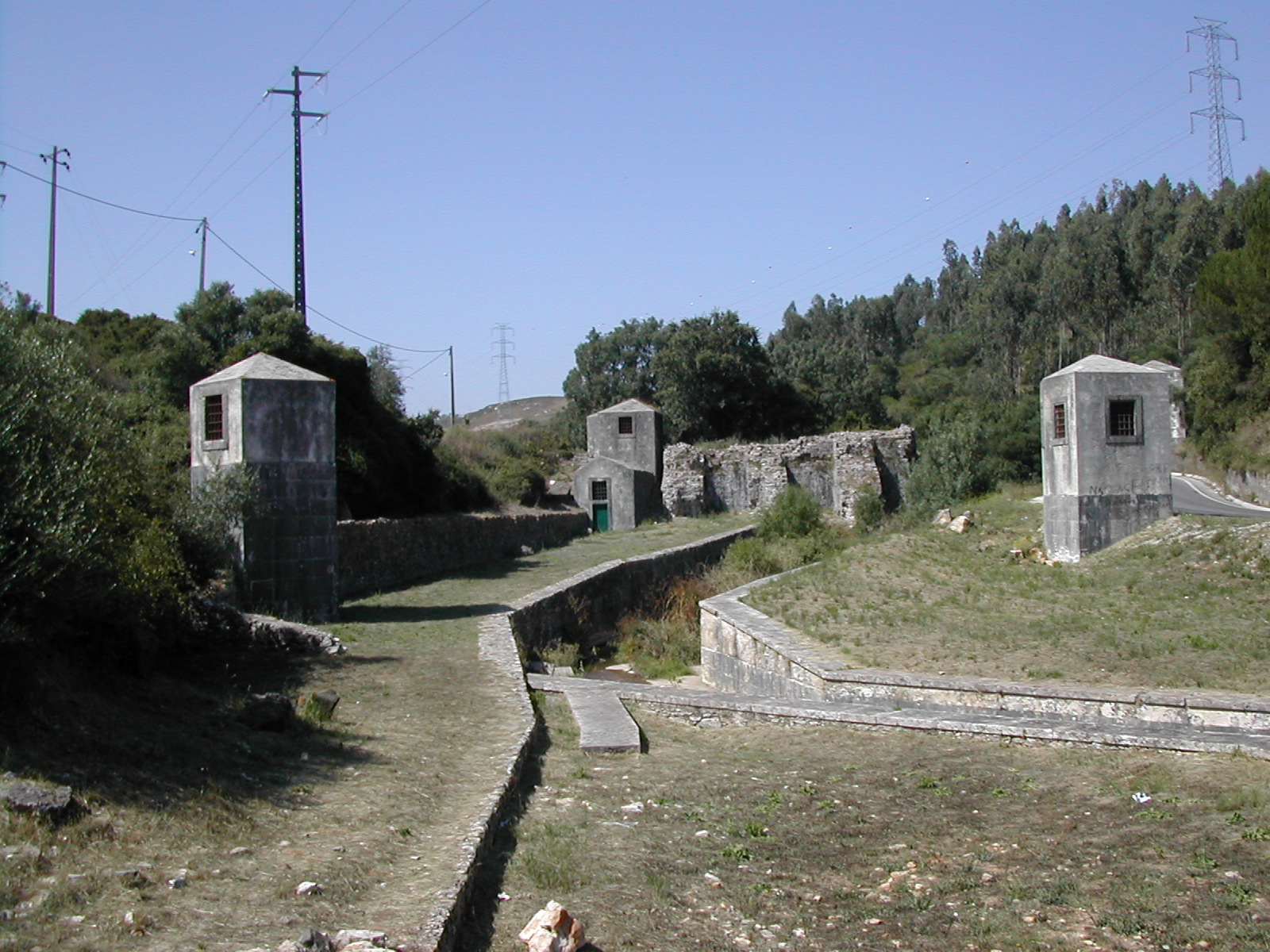
Part of the Roman Dam of Belas complex, showing the ventilation structures (foreground) and the remaining dam segment (background).

During the Roman occupation of the peninsula, the region of Sintra was part of the vast Civitas Olisiponense which Caesar (around 49 B.C.) or more likely Octavius (around 30 B.C.) granted the status of Municipium Civium Romanorum. The various residents of the region were considered part of the Roman Galeria and in the present village of Sintra there are Roman remains testifying to a Roman presence from the 1st–2nd centuries B.C. to the 5th century A.D. A roadway along the southeast part of the Sintra Mountains and connected to the main road to Olisipo dates from this period.

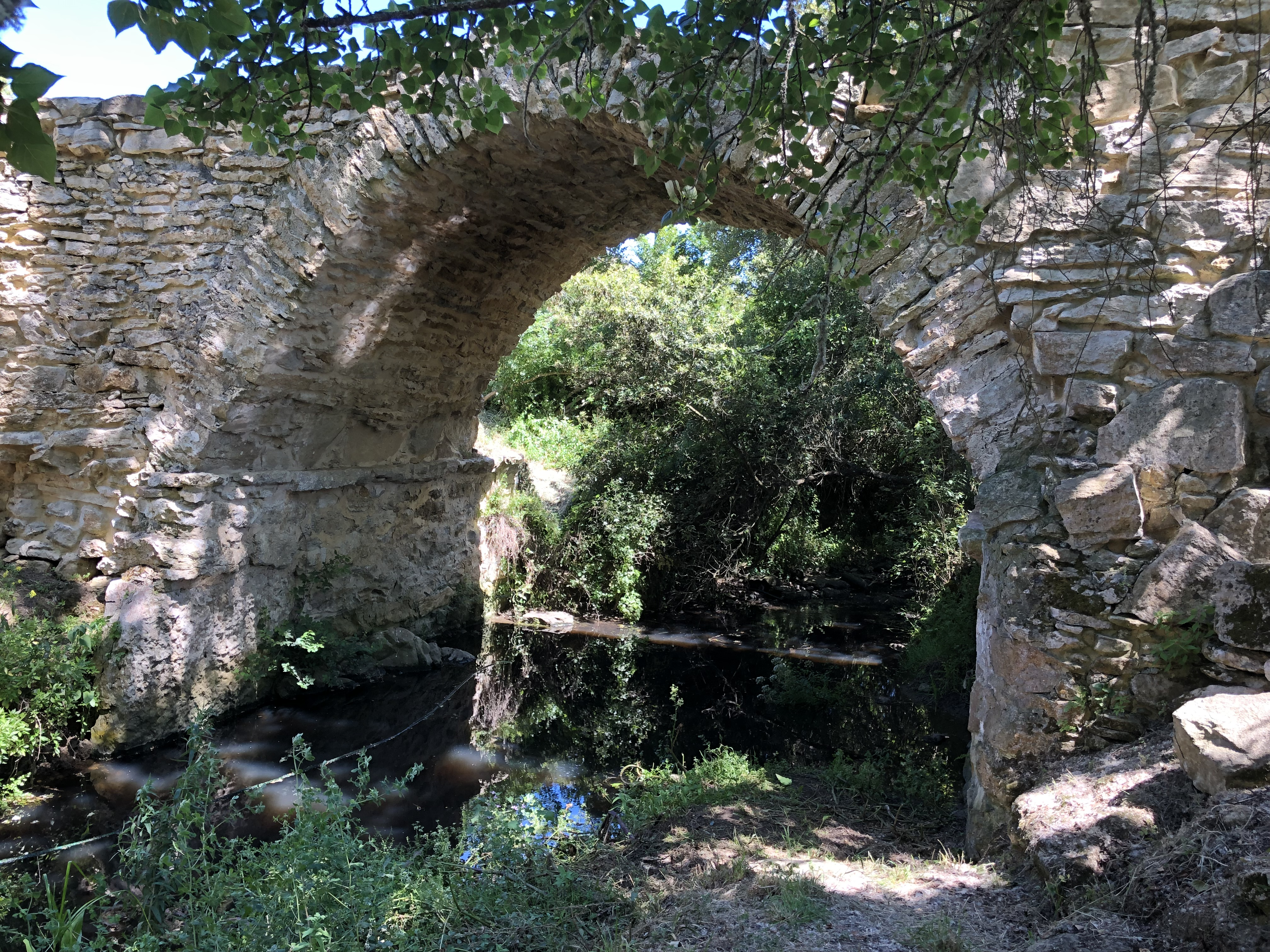
Roman Bridge of Catribana.

This via followed the route of the current Rua da Ferraria, the Calçada dos Clérigos and the Calçada da Trindade. Following the Roman custom of siting tombs along their roads and near their homes, there is also evidence of inscriptions pertaining to Roman funeral monuments, dating mainly to the 2nd century. The area around the modern town of Sintra, due to its proximity to Olisipo, the ancient name of Lisbon, was always profoundly interconnected with the major settlement, to the point that the Fountain of Armés, a 1st-century fountain in the village of Armés, Terrugem, in Sintra, has been built by Lucius Iulius Maelo Caudicus, an Olisipo flamen, to honour the Roman Emperor Augustus.

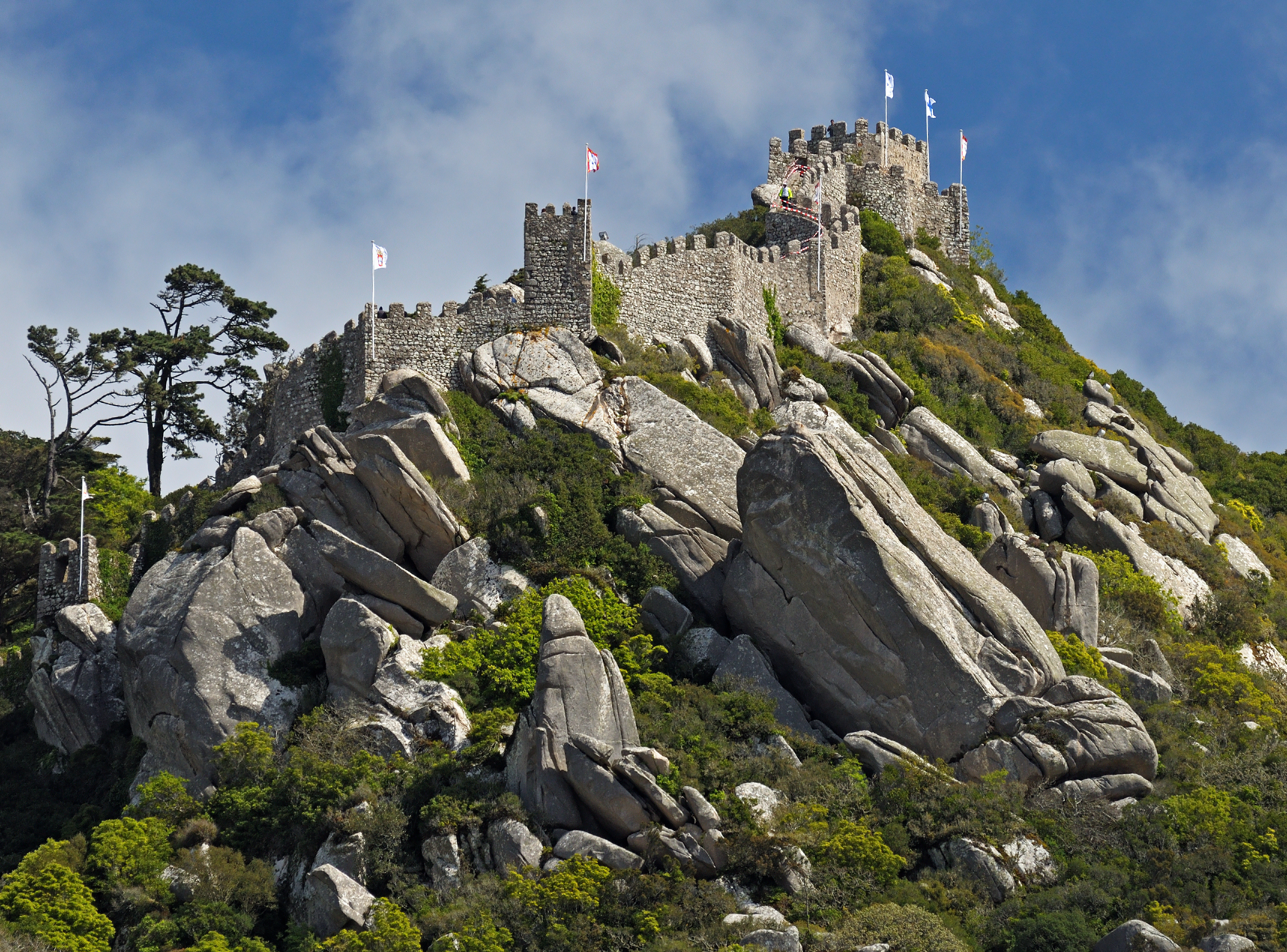
The Castle of the Moors, on the hilltops of Sintra

It was during the Moorish occupation of Sintra (Arabic: Xintara) that Greco-Latin writers wrote of the explicit occupation of the area of the town centre. A description by the geographer Al-Bacr, described Sintra as "one of the towns that [are] dependent on Lisbon in Al-Andalus, in proximity to the sea", characterizing it as "permanently submersed in a fog that never dissipates".

During the Reconquista (around the 9th century), its principal centre and castle were isolated by Christian armies. Following the fall of the Caliphate of Córdoba, the King of León, Alfonso VI received in the spring of 1093, the cities of Santarém, Lisbon and the Castle of Sintra. This followed a period of internal instability within the Muslim taifas of the peninsula, and in particular the decision by the ruler of Taifa of Badajoz, Umar ibn Muhammad al-Mutawakkil who, after hesitating from 1090 to 1091, placed his territory under the suzerainty of Alfonso VI when faced with the threat of the Almoravids. Afonso took the cities and the castle of Sintra between 30 April and 8 May 1093, but shortly after their transfer Sintra and Lisbon were conquered by the Almoravids. Santarém was saved by Henry, whom Alfonso had nominated Count of Portugal in 1096, to replace Raymond of Burgundy.

=== Kingdom ===
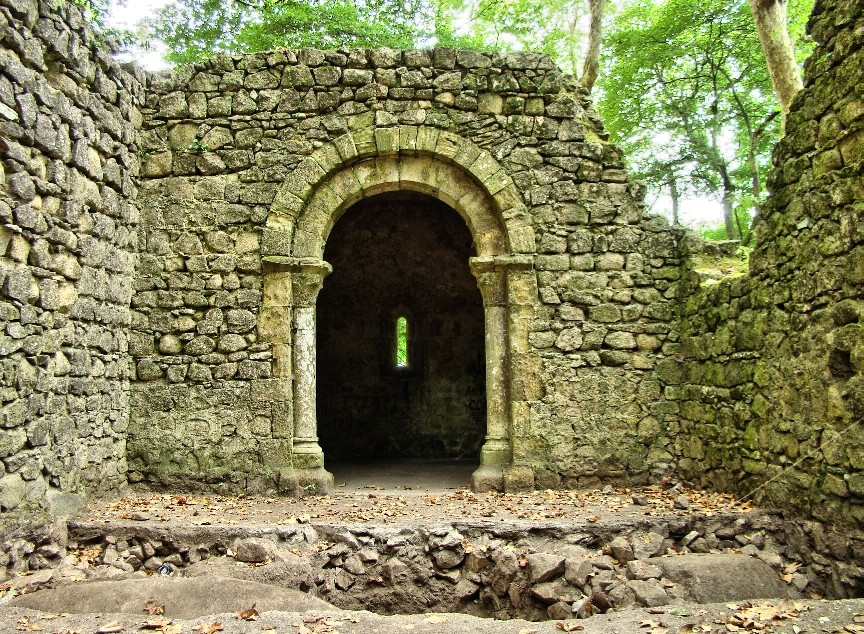
The remnants of the chapel of São Pedro de Canaferrim, constructed by Afonso Henriques following the surrender of Moors in Sintra

In July 1109, Count Henry reconquered the Castle of Sintra. This was preceded a year before by an attempt by Prince Sigurd the Crusader, son of Magnus III of Norway, to capture the castle from the Moors in the course of his trek to the Holy Land. Sigurd's forces disembarked at the mouth of the Colares River but failed to take the castle. But it was only after the conquest of Lisbon, in October 1147, by Afonso Henriques (supported by Crusaders), that the castle surrendered definitively to the Christians, in November. It was integrated into Christian dominions along with Almada and Palmela after their surrender. Afonso Henriques established the Church of São Pedro de Canaferrim within the walls of the Moorish Castle to mark his success.

On 9 January 1154, Afonso Henriques signed a foral ("charter") for the town of Sintra, with all its respective regalia. The charter established the municipality of Sintra, whose territory encompassed a large area, eventually divided into four great parishes: São Pedro de Canaferrim (in the castle), São Martinho (in the town of Sintra), Santa Maria and São Miguel (in the ecclesiastical seat of Arrabalde). The early municipal seat, the town of Sintra, was the centre of a significant Sephardic community, with a synagogue and quarter. This community was not limited to Sintra town: enclaves are mentioned during the reign of King Denis in Colares, but were heavily pressured by the influx of Christian serfs. Throughout the 12th and 13th centuries, owing to the fertility of the land, various convents, monasteries and military orders constructed residences, estates, water-mills and vineyards. There are municipal records from this period of a number of donations and grants; between 1157 and 1158, Afonso Henriques donated to the master of the Knights Templar, Gualdim Pais, various houses and estates in the centre of Sintra.

In 1210, the Monastery of Santa Cruz in Coimbra acquired four houses in Pocilgais, releasing them in 1230, while in 1264 it controlled homes and vineyards in Almargem. In 1216 the Monastery of São Vicente de Fora (Lisbon) also held a vineyard in Colares and, in 1218, estates in Queluz and Barota. At some time between 1223 and 1245, the Monastery of Santa Maria de Alcobaça held various privileges in the territory. The military Order of Santiago owned an estate in Arrifana in 1260. Many of Afonso Henriques' donations in the 12th century, including privileges assigned to these institutions, were confirmed in 1189 by his son, Sancho I (1185–1211), corresponding to a social, political and economic strategy during the post-Reconquista era. Consequently, after 1261, Sintra had a local administration consisting of an alcalde representing the Crown, and two local judges elected by the public. During the political conflict between King Sancho II (1223–1248) and the Church, the churches of São Pedro and São Martinho, which belonged to the King, were ceded to the Bishop of Lisbon and Sé. Yet the Crown's patrimony was defined early: in 1287, King Denis donated to Queen Elizabeth of Portugal the town, the signeurial holdings and all their associated benefits. Later, these lands were transferred to the young Infante Afonso (later King Afonso IV), and remained in his possession until 1334, before reverting to the ownership of the queen (Portuguese: Casa da Rainha).

The Black Death arrived in Sintra in the 14th century; in 1350, the disease is known to have caused the death of five municipal scribes. Far greater numbers of deaths probably resulted, perhaps owing to the cool climate and humidity, conditions that favoured the rapid spread of the disease.

The Palace of Sintra, for a long time the residence of the royal family during the summer

During the reign of King Ferdinand (1367–1383), Sintra played a part in the controversial marriage of the monarch to Dona Leonor Telles de Menezes. In 1374, the King donated Sintra to the Lady Telles, whom he eventually married in secret in the north of the country. Along with Sintra the King conceded the municipalities of Vila Viçosa, Abrantes and Almada, to the consternation of his private council; following a confrontation the King abandoned his duties and travelled to Sintra, where he remained for a month on the pretext of hunting. As Sintra was located relatively close to Lisbon, many of its people were called to work on projects for the Crown in the capital: in 1373, King Ferdinand decided to wall the city, and requested funds or workers from coastal lands in Almada, Sesimbra, Palmela, Setúbal, Coina, Benavente and Samora Correia, as well as all of Ribatejo, and from the inland areas of Sintra, Cascais, Torres Vedras, Alenquer, Arruda, Atouguia, Lourinhã, Telheiros and Mafra. During the Dynastic Crisis between 1383 and 1385, Sintra joined Leonor Telles in supporting the proclamation of her daughter, Beatrice, who married John I of Castile, as Queen of Portugal and Castile. After the defeat of the Castilian army at Aljubarrota (August 1385) by Portuguese and English troops, commanded by Nuno Álvares Pereira, Sintra became one of the last places to surrender to the Master of Aviz, later King of Portugal (after 1383).

=== Joanine and Philippine era ===
John I (1385–1433), first King of the second dynasty, broke the tradition of transferring Sintra to the Casa da Rainha (Queen's property). Probably around 1383, John I granted the lands of Sintra to Count Henrique Manuel de Vilhena, quickly revoking the decision after Henrique took the Infanta's side during the dynastic quarrel. Sintra, therefore, continued as a possession of the King, who expanded the local estate. Until the end of the 17th century, the royal palace constituted one of the principal residences and summer estates of the court: it was from here that John decided to conquer Ceuta (1415); King Afonso V was born and died at the palace (1433–1481); and here King John II (1481–1495) was acclaimed sovereign.

In a document issued in 1435 by King Edward (1433–1438), the region was described as: "A land of good air and water and of the Comarcas with an abundance in the sea and land [...] our most loyal city of Lisbon being so near, and being in it sufficient diversions, and the distractions of the mountains and hunting...".

During the Portuguese Age of Discovery, several people born in Sintra were written into history. In 1443 Gonçalo de Sintra, squire in the House of the Infante Henry, was sent by the prince as captain of a caravel to the coast of Africa. He explored the region near the Ouro River and eventually died there in 1444. Pedro de Sintra and Soeiro da Costa later mapped most of the Atlantic coast of Africa, around the time of Henry's death in 1460.

At the end of the 15th century the importance of Sintra on official itineraries led Queen Eleanor of Viseu (wife of King John II), then principal benefactor of the Portuguese Misericóridas, to expand her principal institutions in Sintra. The Hospital e Gafaria do Espírito Santo, the only remnant of which left standing is a chapel to São Lázaro, was constructed to provide assistance and support to lepers in the region (the chapel still includes the signets of King John, the pelican, and Queen Leonor, the shrimp). In 1545, the hospital was transferred to the administration of the Santa Casa da Misericórdia of Sintra which was set up by Queen Catherine of Austria, wife of John III.

King Manuel I (1495–1521) enjoyed spending his summers in Sintra, due to its cool climate and abundance of game; as Damião de Góis, his chronicler noted: "because it is one of the places in Europe that is cooler, and cheerful for whichever King, Prince or Master to pass their time, because, in addition to its good airs, that cross its mountains, called by the older peoples the promontory of the moon, there is here much hunting of deer and other animals, and overall many and many good trout of many type, and in which in all of Hispania there can be found, and many springs of water...". Between the 15th and 16th century, after travelling to the Crown of Castile and the Crown of Aragon when being considered as heir to the Kingdoms in 1498, the King transformed and enriched the town and its region with several public works. These included the reconstruction of the old Gothic Church of São Martinho and in 1511 the construction of the Monastery of Nossa Senhora da Pena on the highest peak of the Sintra Mountains, which he then transferred to the Order of Saint Jerome. In the second half of the 16th century, Sintra was a centre for courtesans and members of the aristocracy began building estates and farms within the region. In this rural environment, from 1542, the Viceroy of India, D. João de Castro (1500–1548) began residing at Quinta da Penha Verde, where he collected examples of Portuguese culture of the time, including works by celebrated artist Francisco de Holanda. It was during this cultural Renaissance that the marble chancel sculpted between 1529 and 1532 by Nicolau Chanterene for the chapel of the Monastery of Nossa Senhora da Pena was completed, as was the portico of the Church of Nossa Senhora da Conceição da Ulgueira (1560).

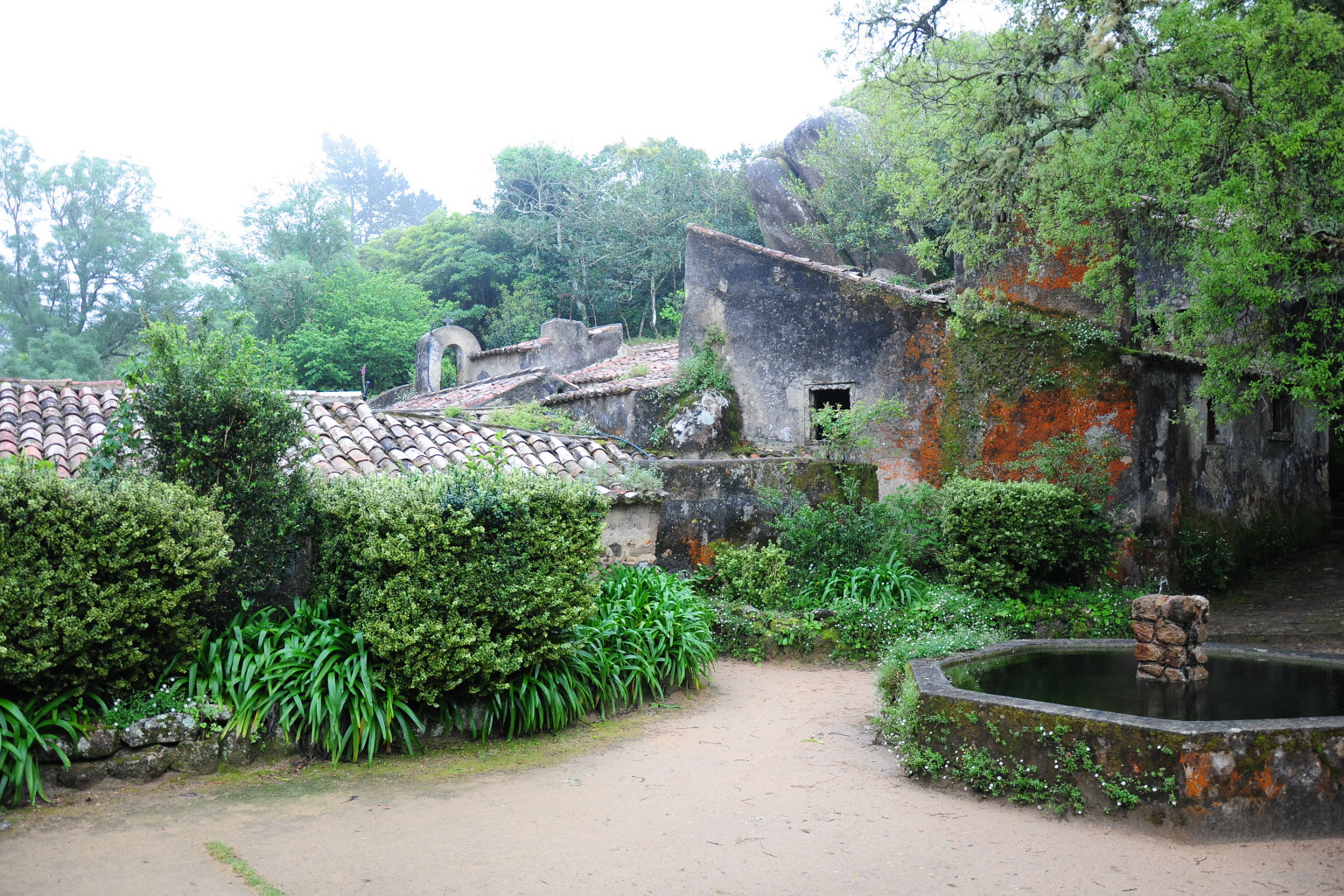
The Convent of the Capuchos, the monastic retreat established during the primordial history of the municipality (16th century)

Luís de Camões (1524–1580) referred to the mountains of Sintra in his Os Lusíadas chronicle, as a mythic land ruled by water nymphs. The Renaissance poet Luisa Sigea—Syntrae Aloisiae Sygeae in Paris (1566) and Madrid (1781) referred to Sintra as a "pleasant valley, between cliffs that rise into the heavens...curved in graceful hills among which one can feel the murmur of the waters...[where] everything, in fact, will enchant and perfume the environment with its fragrance and fruit."

With the death of the Cardinal-King Henry (1578–1580), Philip II of Spain inherited the Kingdom of Portugal, initiating a personal union of the crowns that would last until 1640. During this period, Portuguese political power moved from Sintra to Vila Viçosa, principal centre of the House of Braganza, whose dukes, descendants of John of Portugal, were heirs to the throne of Portugal. Following the decision of the Cortes of Tomar in 1581, Phillip as King of Portugal accepted an administration composed of the Portuguese aristocracy. He passed through Sintra around October 1581, visiting the monasteries and churches. It was during this period that cult of Sebastianism, the hope for the return of King Sebastian, came to an end, when several fake "Sebastians" were denounced. In 1585 Mateus Alvares, born on the island of Terceira in the Azores and guardian of the hermitage of São Julio, passed himself off as King Sebastian and created conflict in Sintra, Madra, Rio de Mouro and Ericeira. The Sebastian adventure ended with the hanging of thirty people and the suffering of many more. It was not surprising, therefore, that the visit in 1619 by King Philip IV of Spain (Philip III of Portugal) resulted in many families escaping to the hills. During this union (1580–1640), Sintra was a privileged place for Portuguese "exiles" from the Castilian court; nobles who wished to distance themselves from Spanish nobility would purchase lands in the region, away from court intrigue. At the time of the Restoration, in 1640, the municipality had approximately 4000 residents.

=== Brigantine era ===
Royal Palace of Queluz.

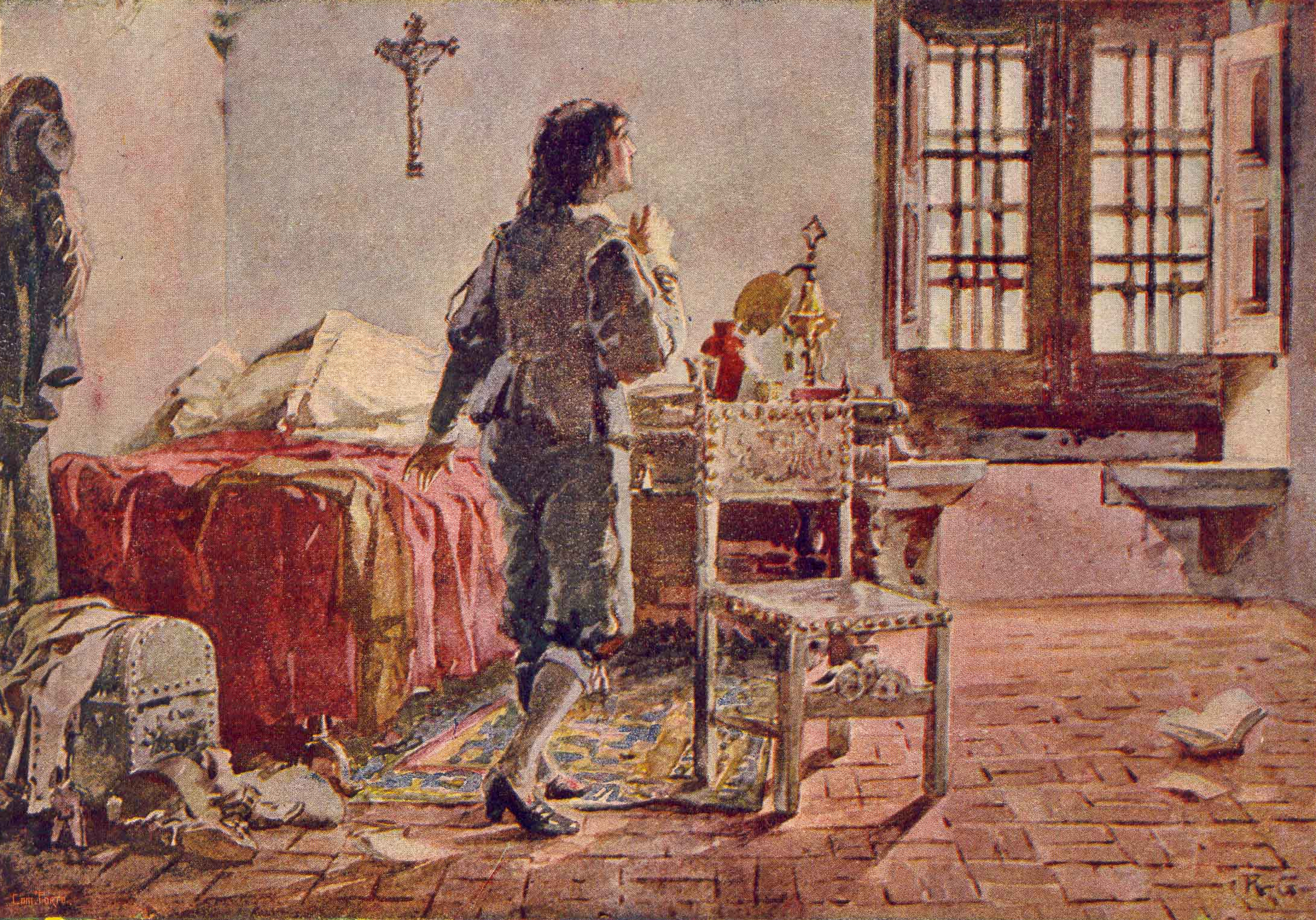
Ill-fated king Afonso VI imprisoned in the Palace of Sintra, by painter Alfredo Roque Gameiro.

The war with Spain (1640–1668), the affirmation of Mafra during the reign of John V of Portugal (1706–1750) through the construction of the Palace-Convent, and later the construction of Royal Palace of Queluz in 1747 during the reigns of Joseph I (1750–1777) and Maria I (1777–1816), helped diminish royal visits to the region. During this time there were only two documented visits: in 1652 and 1654, respectively the visit of Queen Luísa de Gusmão and King John IV (1640–1656), and the final burial of King Afonso VI.

Alleging the insanity of the King and the incapacity of the heir, the Duke of Cadaval and the Infante Peter led a coup d'état in 1667 which resulted in the resignation of the Count of Castelo Melhor, Minister of King Afonso VI (1656–1683) and the imprisonment of the monarch. In 1668 the Cortes of Lisbon confirmed the Infante Peter, the king's brother, as regent and heir. Afonso VI lived the rest of his life imprisoned, in the Paço da Ribeira (1667–1669), in the Fortress of Saint John the Baptist in Angra, in the Azores (1669–1674) and in the end, with the discovery of a conspiracy to kill the regent, in the Paço da Vila in Sintra (1674–1683).

From the 17th to the 18th centuries, the region was centre of contemplative religious orders who established convents in Sintra. But it remained a place of myths, with a large, mysterious forest and macabre, gloomy spaces. Father Baião, in his Portugal Cuidadoso (1724) noted: "Next to the Palace of Sintra was a forest, so thick, that during the day, it cast fear in him who entered it. And [King] D. Sebastian was free from these fears, that he would walk at night, through it, many times for two or three hours." Starting in the second half of the 18th century and lasting through the 19th century Sintra became known as a nostalgic and mysterious location described by many foreigners.

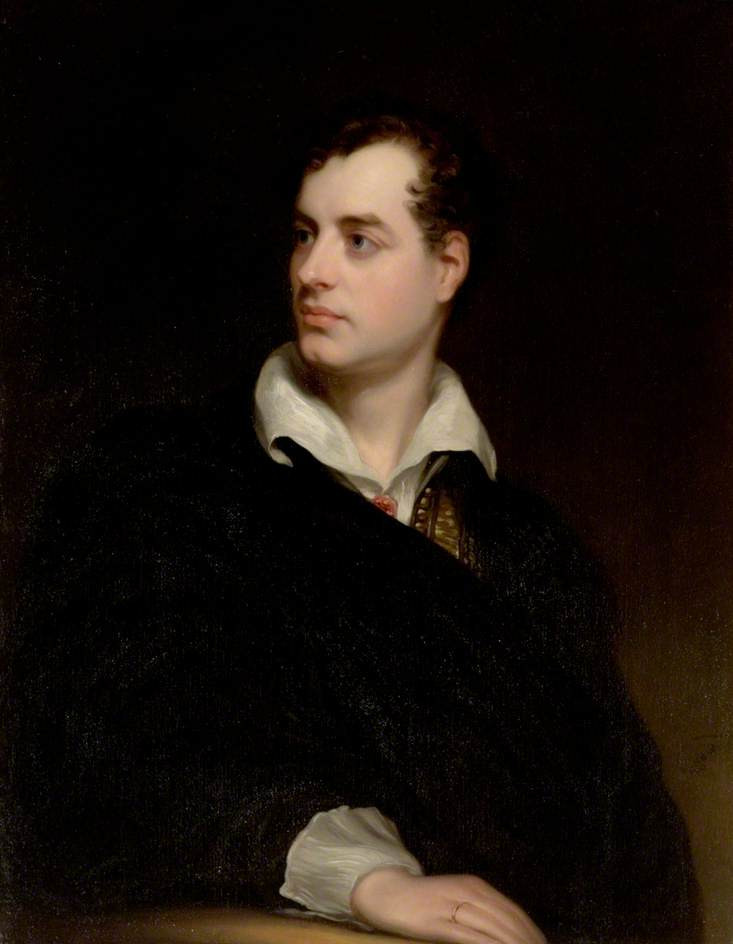
Lord Byron (1788–1824) particularly enjoyed his stay in Sintra, which is described in Childe Harold's Pilgrimage as "glorious Eden".

It was the Romantic Lord Byron's "glorious Eden"; Almeida Garrett's "pleasant resort"; Eça de Queirós's "nest of lovers [where, in] the romantic foliage, the nobles abandoned themselves in the hands of the poets"; or the place where Richard Strauss saw a garden "comparable to Italy, Sicily, Greece or Egypt, a true garden of Klingsor, and there in the heights, a castle of the Holy Grail".

The 1755 Lisbon earthquake, meanwhile, caused the destruction of the centre of Sintra as well as a number of deaths, resulting in building and restoration in the second half of the 18th century. Also in the 18th century, the first industrial building was established in the town: the Fábrica de Estamparia de Rio de Mouro (Mouro River Stamping Factory) in 1778.

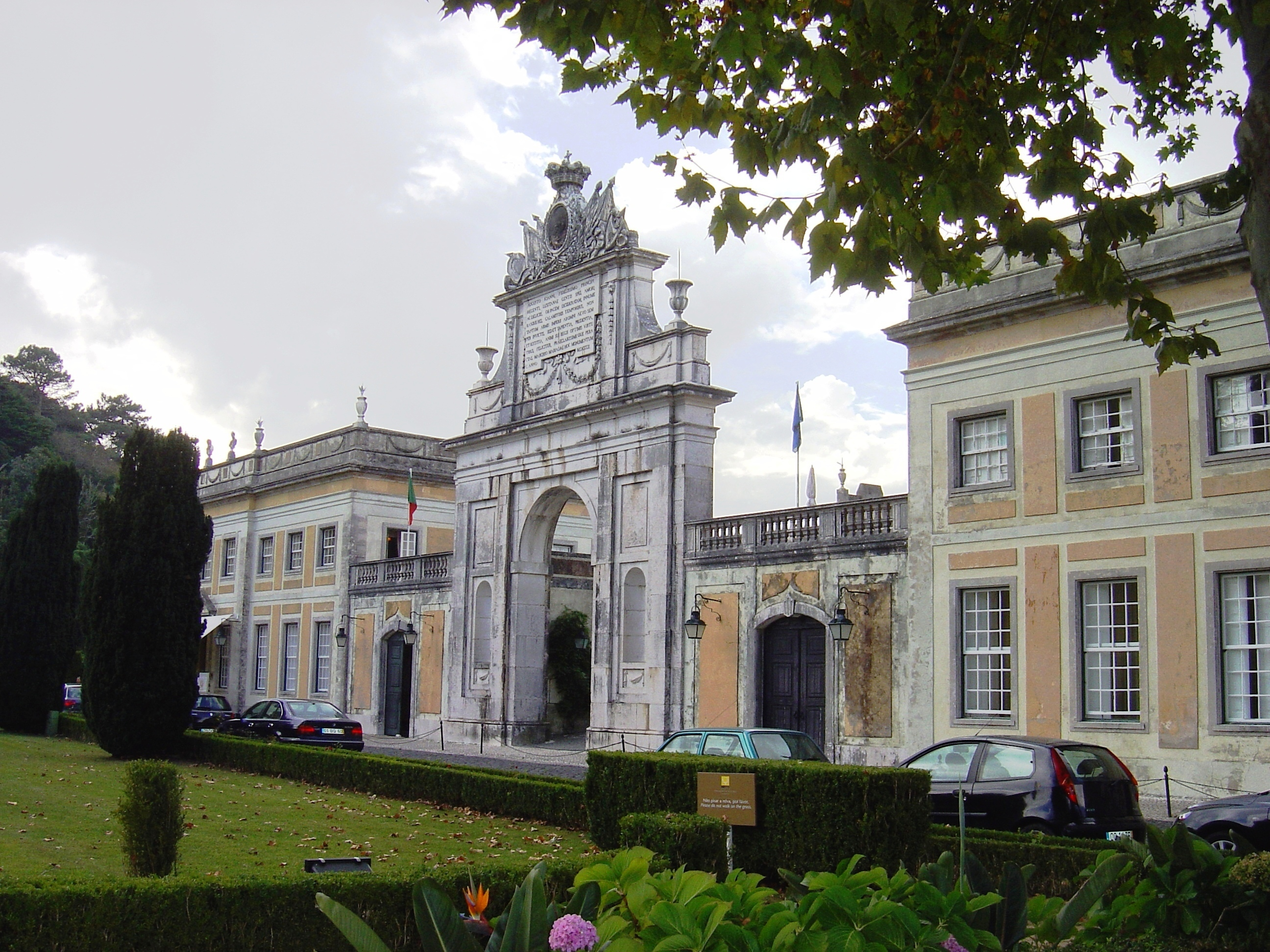
The front façade of Seteais Palace, expanded for the visits of the royal family, by the Marquess of Marialva

The visit of Queen Maria I in 1787 brought about the restoration and redecoration of a few salons and chambers in the municipal buildings. The great festivities of 1795 to celebrate the baptism of the Infante António, son of John VI, resulted in grand balls at the Palace of Queluz. In 1838 the King-Consort, Ferdinand II bought the Monastery of Nossa Senhora da Pena and a vast adjacent area, commissioning the architect José de Costa e Silva to construct an arch joining the two quarters of the Seteais Palace (owned by the Marquis of Marialva), to commemorate the 1802 visit of the Prince and Princess of Brazil, John and Carlota Joaquina, and the subsequent visit of their son, the absolutist King Miguel, in 1830.

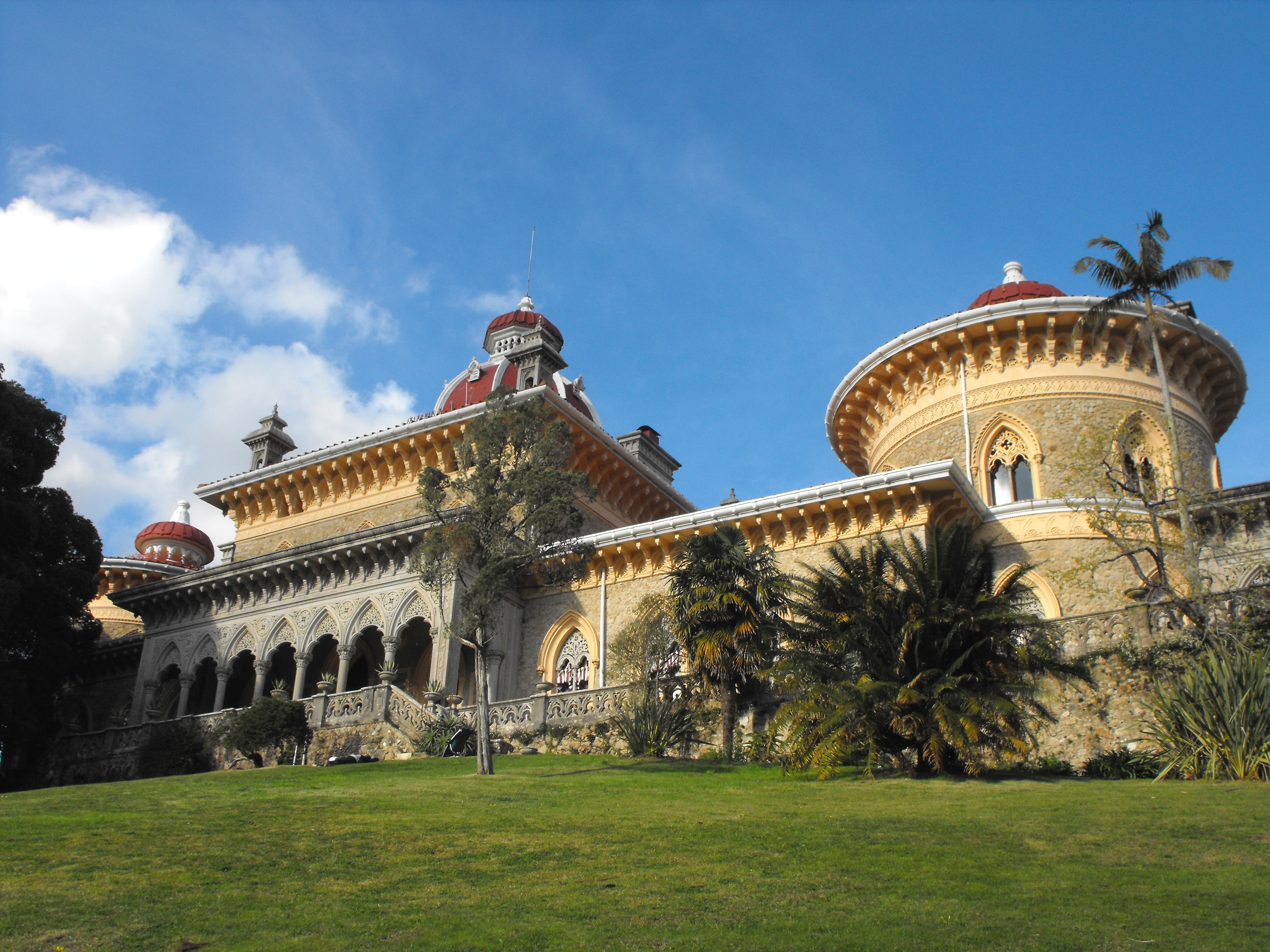
The arabesque Monserrate Estate on another hilltop near the town of Sintra

During the third quarter of the 18th century and practically all of the 19th century, foreign travellers and Portuguese aristocrats, fired by Romanticism, rediscovered the magic of Sintra, especially in its exotic landscapes and climate. Their visits led to the establishment of several hotels, one of which, Lawrence's, opened in 1764, was still functioning in 2018. In the summer of 1787, William Beckford stayed with the Marquis of Marialva, master of the horse for the kingdom, at his residence of Seteais. At the beginning of the 19th century Princess Carlota Joaquina, wife of Prince Regent John, bought the estate and Ramalhão Palace. Between 1791 and 1793, Gerard Devisme constructed a Neo-Gothic mansion on his extensive estate in the Quinta de Monserrate (later known as the Monserrate Palace). Beckford, who remained in Sintra, rented the property from Devisme in 1794. The landscape, covered in fog, also attracted another Englishman, Sir Francis Cook, who occupied the estate, constructing an oriental pavilion.

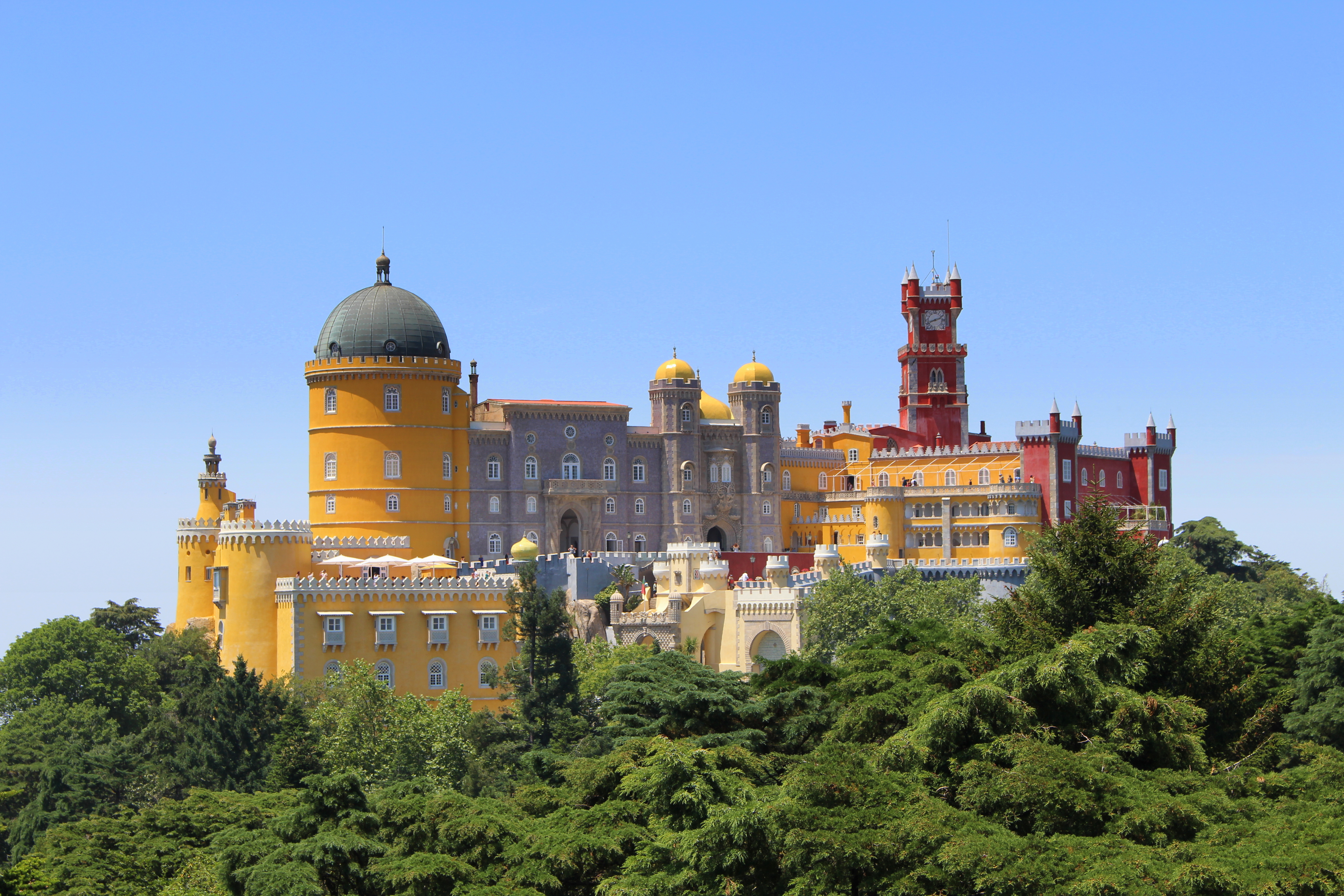
The Pena National Palace: summer residence of the monarchs of Portugal during the 19th century

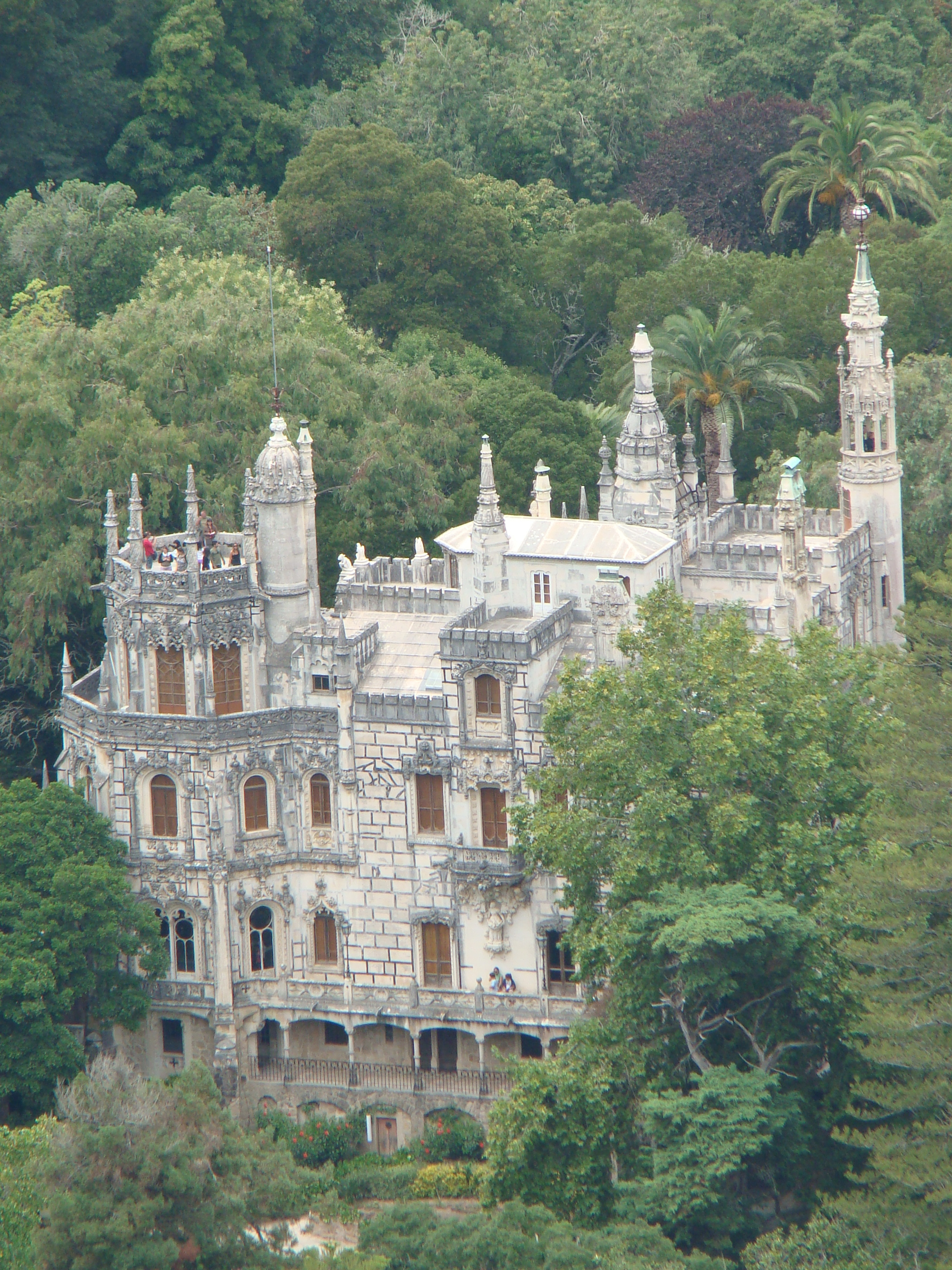
Quinta da Regaleira, an integral landmark of Sintra's UNESCO Cultural Landscape

The Palace of Pena, Sintra's exemplary Portuguese Romantic symbol, was initiated by the King-Consort Ferdinand, husband of Queen Maria II (1834–1853), a German-born member of the House of Saxe-Cobourg-Gotha. The palace was built over the remains of the 16th-century monastery of the Order of Saint Jerome, conserving many fundamental aspects, including the church, cloister and a few dependencies. The architecture is eclectic, influenced by many architectural styles, evidence of an era of Romanticism.

The intentional mixture of eclectic styles includes the Neo-Gothic, Neo-Manueline, Neo-Islamic, and Neo-Renaissance styles. Much of this has been evident since a major restoration that was completed prior to 1900.

The design was a project of the Baron von Eschwege and Ferdinand II, to substitute the Sintra National Palace as an alternative to the summer residence in Cascais. After Sintra, the monarchs Louis of Portugal (1861–1889) and Carlos of Portugal (1863–1908) ended their summers with visits to Cascais in the months of September and October.

In 1854, the first contract was signed to construct a rail link between Sintra and Lisbon. A decree signed on 26 June 1855 regulated the contract between the government and Count Claranges Lucotte but was later rescinded in 1861. The connection was finally inaugurated on 2 April 1887.

By the beginning of the 20th century, Sintra was recognized as a summer resort visited by aristocrats and millionaires. Among these, Carvalho Monteiro, owner of a considerable fortune (known as "Monteiro dos Milhões") constructed near the main town, on an estate he bought from the Baroness of Regaleira, a luxurious revivalist palacette, based on a Neo-Manueline architecture.

From the second half of the 19th century into the first decades of the 20th century, Sintra also became a privileged place for artists: musicians such as Viana da Mota; composers such as Alfredo Keil, painters like João Cristino da Silva (author of one of the most celebrated canvases of Portuguese Romantic art, "Five Artists in Sintra"), writers such as Eça de Queirós or Ramalho Ortigão, all these people lived, worked or got inspiration from Sintra's landscapes.

=== Republic ===
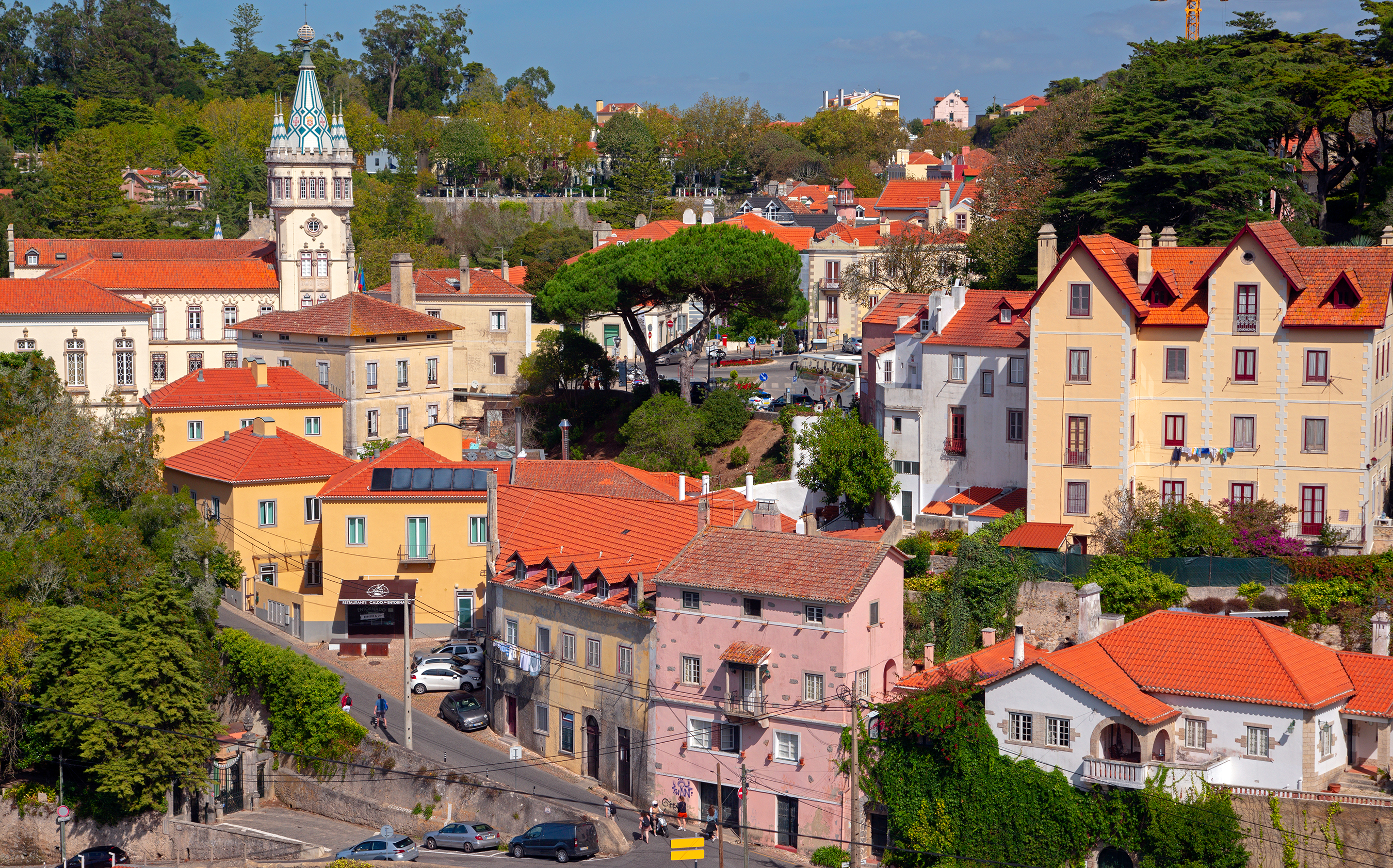
Part of the historic centre

The proclamation of a Portuguese Republic in 1910 transformed the bohemian climate of Sintra. Economic development was now promoted; the potential benefits to the region of growth in agriculture, industry and commerce were promoted to foster development. In 1908 a wine growing zone had been demarcated in Colares. Now a commission was established to monitor the quality of wines and promote their exportation, and in 1914 a commercial association (Portuguese: Associação Comercial e Industrial de Sintra) was set up to manage their concession. Meanwhile, in the name of secular and popular progress, parts of the cultural heritage were destroyed, including the annexes of the medieval village bordering the palace in 1911, while the nave of the Church of the Misericórdia was reduced to the presbytery to allow the road to be widened. The first decades of the 20th century were the time of the fastest urbanization of the town, supported by its rail link to Lisbon and the influx of summer travellers.

During the 1920s damage to culturally important sites led to the creation of institutions to study and protect the vast artistic heritage. The Instituto Histórico de Sintra (Historic Institute of Sintra), under the direction of Afonso de Ornelas, played an important part in this period. Archaeological studies resulted in considerable development: in 1927, Félix Alves Pereira rediscovered the Neolithic settlements of Santa Eufémia, and the first publication of the discoveries at the prehistoric monuments of Praia das Maçãs were completed in 1929. From this time until the 1970s, coastal Sintra was becoming a summer destination, resulting in the building of Portuguese summer residences. Many important Portuguese architects developed projects in the area in the first half of the 20th century, including Raul Lino, Norte Júnior and Tertuliano de Lacerda Marques.

These projects benefited town and region, increased tourism and attracted as residents many notable Portuguese: historian Francisco Costa; writer Ferreira de Castro; sculptor Anjos Teixeira; architects Norte Júnior and Raul Lino; painters Eduardo Viana, Mily Possoz and Vieira da Silva; poet Oliva Guerra; composer and maestro Frederico de Freitas; historians Felix Alves Pereira and João Martins da Silva Marques.

In 1944, prior to his arrest, Vichy France Prime Minister Pierre Laval had planned to move to an estate in Sintra, where a house had been leased for him.

The 1949 municipal plan by De Groer was devised to protect the town and its neighbourhood from uncontrolled urbanization, and resulted in the maintenance of an environment comparable to 19th century Sintra. Urban anarchy predominated until the middle of the 1980s in the areas adjacent to the main town of Sintra, resulting in the development of new neighbourhoods.

== Geography ==
=== Physical geography ===
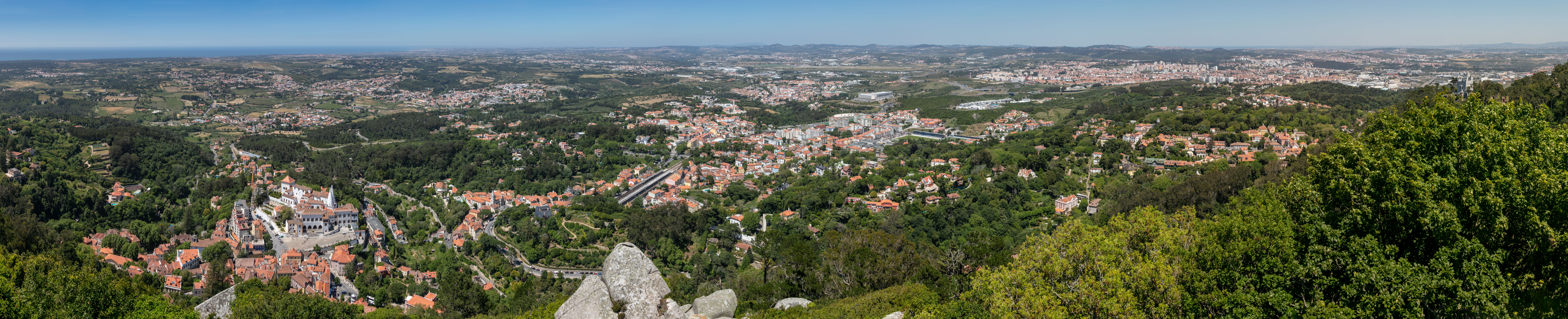
The town of Sintra sitting atop the Sintra Mountains, the exposed granite formation of igneous rock extending to the Atlantic Ocean

The Sintra Mountains, a granite massif ten kilometres long – considered the Monte da Lua (Mountain of the Moon), or Promontorium Lunae by the strong local tradition of astral cults – emerge abruptly between a vast plain to the north and the northern margin of the Tagus River estuary, winding in a serpentine cordillera towards the Atlantic Ocean and Cabo da Roca, the most westerly point of continental Europe.

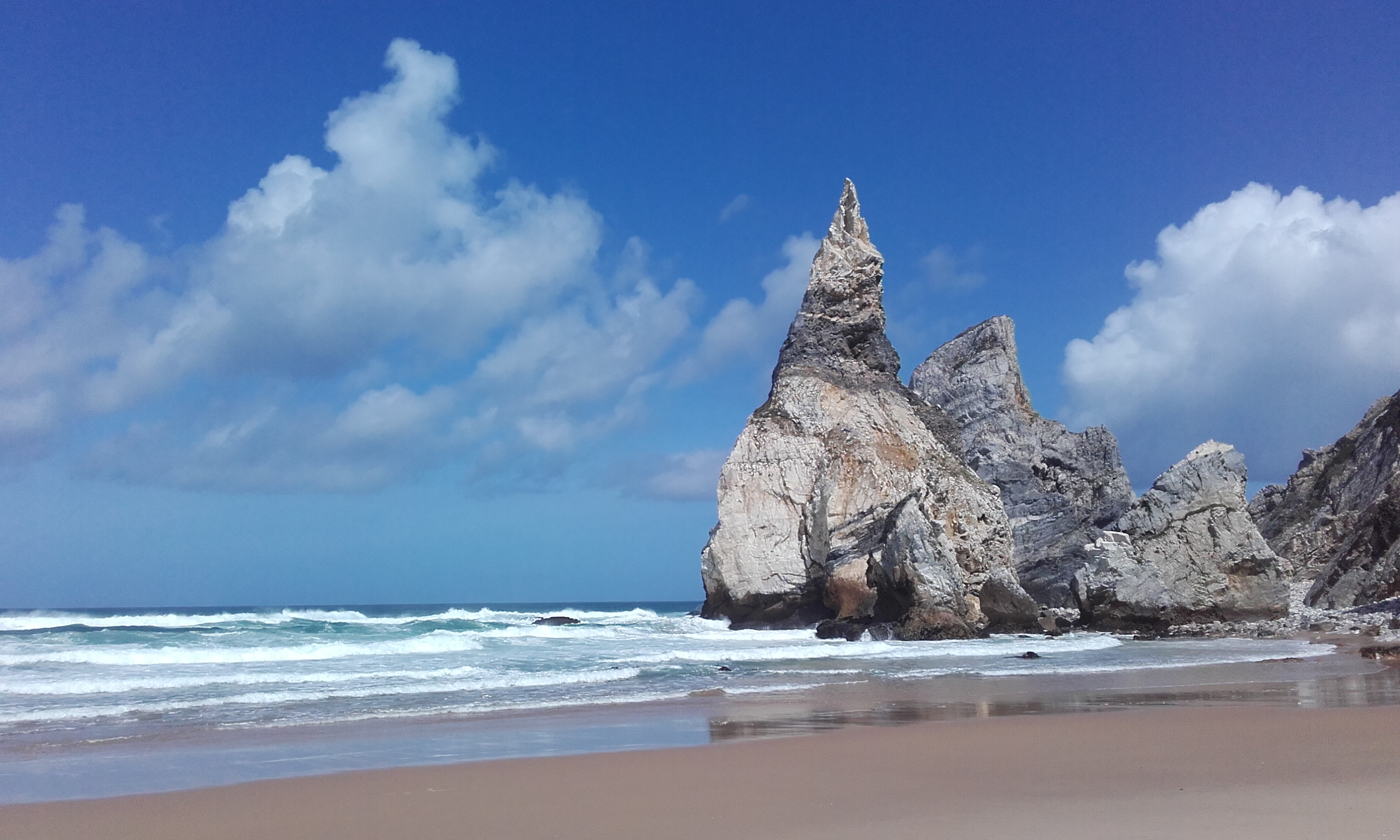
The imposing cliffs which delimit the Sintra range and the Atlantic

The São João platform, along the northern flank of the Sintra Mountains, has altitudes between 100 metres (330 ft) and 150 metres (490 ft), while the southern part of the mountains, the Cascais platform, is lower: sloping from 150 metres (490 ft) to the sea, terminating along the coast, around 30 metres (98 ft) above sea level. The spectacular relief results from the east–west orientation of the massif's axis, its terminus at the coast, and the nature of igneous rocks, which are resistant to erosion. The Eruptive Massif of Sintra (MES) is a dome structure, formed by layers of sedimentary rocks (limestones and sandstones) from the Upper Jurassic and early Cretaceous periods. A metamorphosed igneous intrusion resulted in a narrow halo of metamorphic rocks, but also strongly deformed these sedimentary layers causing a vertical exposure. While in the south there are enclosed sedimentary layers, to the north (around Praia Grande) the massif is steep. The sedimentary formations, until the beginning of the Upper Cretaceous, are deformed by the intrusion which limits the MES to the end the Cretaceous. Radiometric aging of different rocks from the massif has indicated an age between 80 and 75 million years (confirming the installation of the massive Upper Cretaceous).

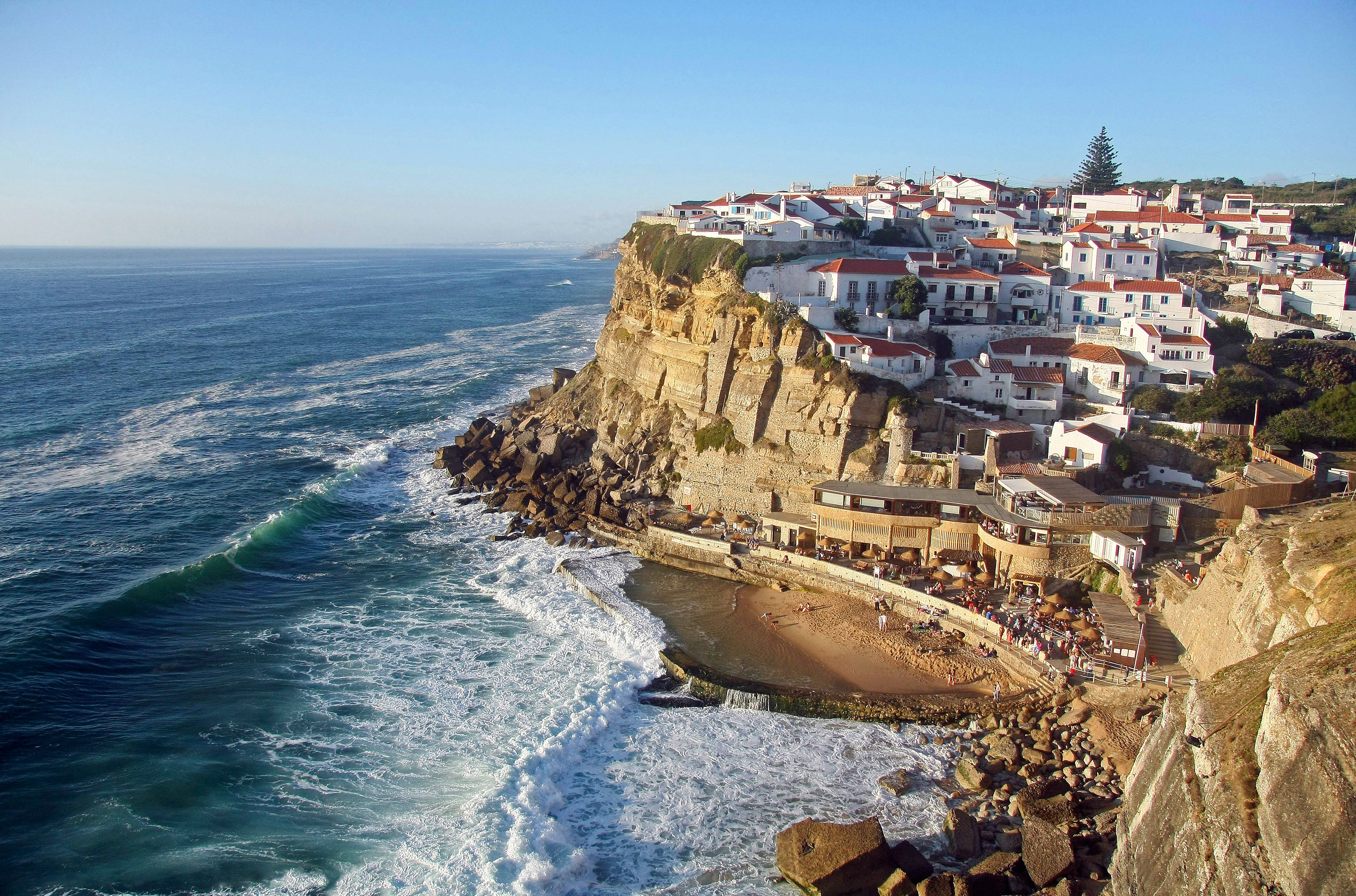
Beach in Azenhas do Mar, Sintra

The geodynamic conditions that controlled the formation of the MES (correlated with the development of the Sines and Monchique Eruptive Massifs) are associated with the progressive northern expansion of the Atlantic Ocean and the consequent opening of the Bay of Biscay. The Bay of Biscay's expansion resulted in complex tensions responsible for profound fractures in the Earth's crust that were conduits for the ascension of magma. Around 80 million years ago this magma spread across the surface as a superficial crust with a depth of 5 kilometres between sedimentary layers (160 to 9 million years old) that were chemically metamorphosed. Over time the magma chamber cooled and crystallized, resulting in conditions that caused the granular textures that characterize the MES. The weaker sedimentary layers were susceptible to erosion, and their products were deposited around their base. Consequently, the massif likely became exposed during the Paleogenic epoch (30 million years ago), known as the Benfica Complex.

=== Climate and biome ===
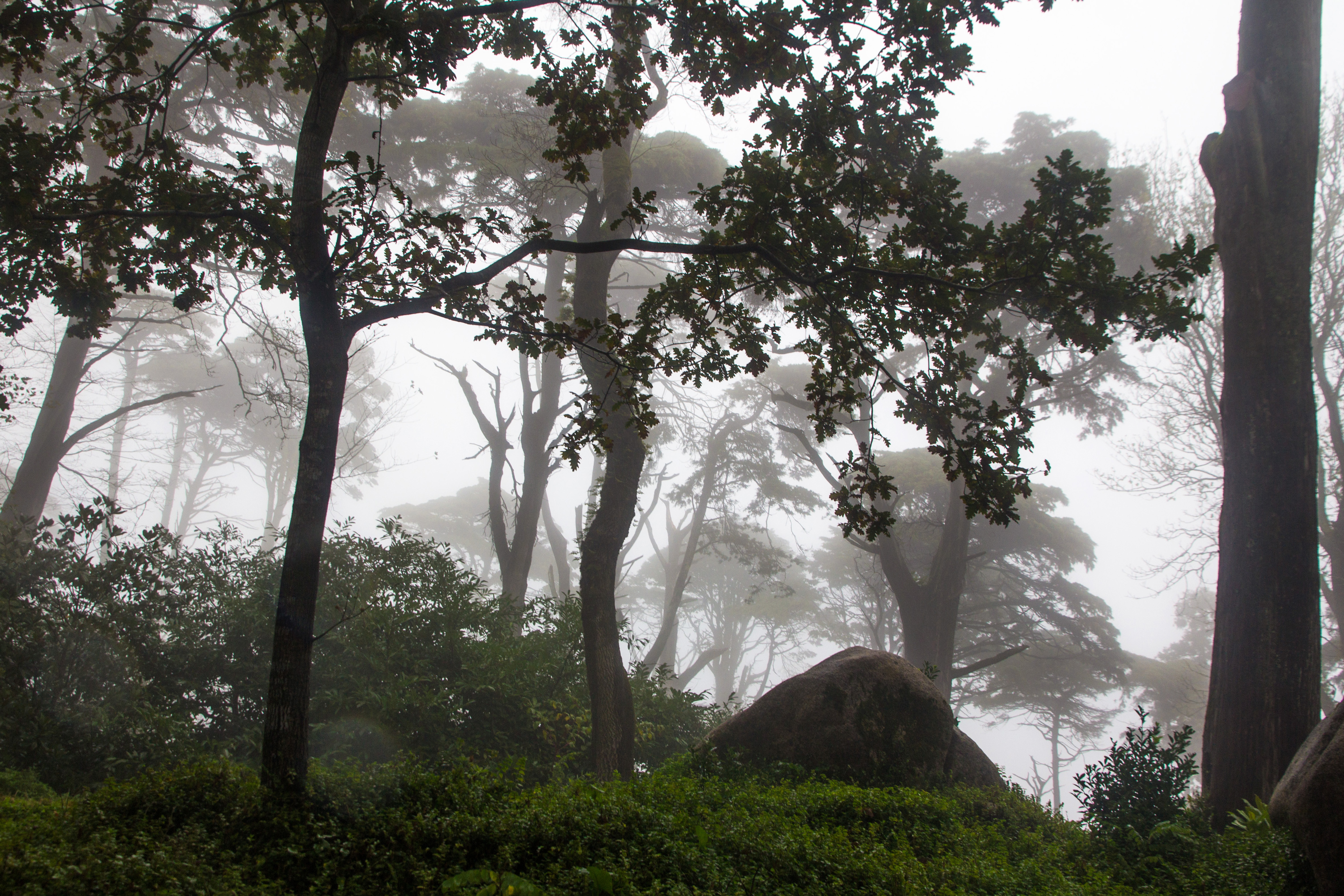
High humidity and cooler temperatures are rather frequent in the mountains of Sintra

The Mediterranean climate, influenced by the Atlantic and characterized by moderate temperatures and wet winters, is typical of mainland Portugal. Although the climate in the area of Cabo da Roca is close to semi-arid, the Sintra Mountains are considered moderately humid: precipitation in the mountains is higher than in the surrounding areas. The position of the town in the natural landscape of the Sintra Mountains (consisting of an exuberant natural patrimony), is influenced by the existence of a micro-climate. For different reasons (the climate here has been moderated by the Sintra Mountains; the fertility of the soils; and its relative proximity to the Tagus estuary) the region attracted considerable early settlement. Due to its micro-climate, a huge park has developed full of dense foliage with a rich botanical diversity.

The temperate climate and humidity resulting from proximity to the coast favour the growth of a rich mat of forest including Atlantic and Mediterranean species, marking the transition in Portugal from northern to southern vegetation. The Pyrenean oak (Quercus pyrenaica) predominates over great expanses of the rocky heights and sheltered slopes. On moist shady slopes, normally facing north, or in sheltered places, the common oak (Quercus robur) is widespread. In lowland areas and warm places the cork oak (Quercus suber) is common and in limestone areas the Portuguese oak (Quercus faginea) is found. Other species scattered throughout the mountains of Sintra include: maple (Acer pseudoplatanus), common hazel (Corylus avellana), common hawthorn (Crataegus monogyna), European holly (Ilex aquifolium), Portuguese laurel (Prunus lusitanica), Bay laurel (Laurus nobilis), strawberry tree (Arbutus unedo), laurestine (Viburnum tinus), Kermes oak (Quercus coccifera), and Italian buckthorn (Rhamnus alaternus). In the valleys, near watercourses, grow narrow-leaf ash (Fraxinus angustifolia), Grey willow (Salix atrocinerea), European alder (Alnus glutinosa), alder buckthorn (Frangula alnus) and black elderberry (Sambucus nigra).

Since 1966, the Sintra Mountains have been affected by fires that have destroyed a major part of the original forest, which has been substituted by acacia and other fast-growing exotic species. The forested area of the Sintra mountains is about 5,000 hectares (50 km^{2}), of which 26% (1,300 hectares (13 km^{2})) is maintained by the State through the Direcção Geral de Florestas – Núcleo Florestal de Sintra (General Directorate of Forests – Sintra Forestry Service).

Climate data for Sintra (Sintra Air Base) 1971–2000
Month	Jan	Feb	Mar	Apr	May	Jun	Jul	Aug	Sep	Oct	Nov	Dec	Year
Record high °C (°F)	21.6 (70.9)	23.4 (74.1)	27.2 (81.0)	28.0 (82.4)	33.6 (92.5)	41.4 (106.5)	39.8 (103.6)	38.5 (101.3)	37.8 (100.0)	31.8 (89.2)	27.0 (80.6)	22.5 (72.5)	41.4 (106.5)
Mean daily maximum °C (°F)	14.3 (57.7)	14.9 (58.8)	16.8 (62.2)	17.4 (63.3)	19.2 (66.6)	22.3 (72.1)	24.7 (76.5)	25.3 (77.5)	24.5 (76.1)	21.1 (70.0)	17.5 (63.5)	15.1 (59.2)	19.4 (66.9)
Daily mean °C (°F)	9.7 (49.5)	10.6 (51.1)	12.0 (53.6)	13.0 (55.4)	14.9 (58.8)	17.8 (64.0)	20.0 (68.0)	20.4 (68.7)	19.4 (66.9)	16.4 (61.5)	13.0 (55.4)	10.9 (51.6)	14.9 (58.8)
Mean daily minimum °C (°F)	5.2 (41.4)	6.2 (43.2)	7.3 (45.1)	8.5 (47.3)	10.6 (51.1)	13.3 (55.9)	15.2 (59.4)	15.6 (60.1)	14.3 (57.7)	11.6 (52.9)	8.6 (47.5)	6.8 (44.2)	10.3 (50.5)
Record low °C (°F)	−3.5 (25.7)	−3.5 (25.7)	−2.0 (28.4)	−0.1 (31.8)	3.2 (37.8)	6.0 (42.8)	8.6 (47.5)	8.4 (47.1)	4.8 (40.6)	−1.0 (30.2)	−3.5 (25.7)	−4.0 (24.8)	−4.0 (24.8)
Average precipitation mm (inches)	100.7 (3.96)	90.7 (3.57)	57.2 (2.25)	72.3 (2.85)	56.8 (2.24)	18.2 (0.72)	6.2 (0.24)	6.9 (0.27)	28.4 (1.12)	91.0 (3.58)	111.5 (4.39)	127.8 (5.03)	767.7 (30.22)
Average precipitation days (≥ 0.1 mm)	14.3	14.5	11.2	13.1	10.5	6.1	3.6	3.1	6.8	11.9	13.9	16.0	125.0
Average relative humidity (%)	87	85	80	77	75	75	74	74	77	82	84	86	80
Mean monthly sunshine hours	152.2	149.5	205.0	224.0	255.4	269.7	309.0	307.3	244.2	203.5	158.7	128.5	2,607
Source: Instituto Português do Mar e da Atmosfera

Climate data for Sintra (Granja), altitude: 134 m (440 ft), 1961–1984 normals, 1953–2003 sun hours
Month	Jan	Feb	Mar	Apr	May	Jun	Jul	Aug	Sep	Oct	Nov	Dec	Year
Mean daily maximum °C (°F)	14.1 (57.4)	14.4 (57.9)	15.9 (60.6)	17.3 (63.1)	19.1 (66.4)	22.3 (72.1)	24.4 (75.9)	25.0 (77.0)	24.3 (75.7)	21.4 (70.5)	17.3 (63.1)	14.6 (58.3)	19.2 (66.5)
Daily mean °C (°F)	9.8 (49.6)	10.2 (50.4)	11.4 (52.5)	12.7 (54.9)	14.7 (58.5)	17.6 (63.7)	19.5 (67.1)	20.0 (68.0)	19.1 (66.4)	16.4 (61.5)	12.7 (54.9)	10.2 (50.4)	14.5 (58.2)
Mean daily minimum °C (°F)	5.5 (41.9)	6.0 (42.8)	6.9 (44.4)	8.1 (46.6)	10.3 (50.5)	12.9 (55.2)	14.6 (58.3)	15.0 (59.0)	15.1 (59.2)	13.9 (57.0)	8.1 (46.6)	6.8 (44.2)	10.3 (50.5)
Average precipitation mm (inches)	110 (4.3)	113 (4.4)	83 (3.3)	59 (2.3)	46 (1.8)	23 (0.9)	4 (0.2)	5 (0.2)	25 (1.0)	78 (3.1)	121 (4.8)	109 (4.3)	776 (30.6)
Average relative humidity (%)	87	85	80	77	75	75	74	74	77	82	84	86	80
Mean monthly sunshine hours	151.9	152.6	198.4	231.0	266.6	279.0	316.2	310.0	243.0	207.7	162	139.5	2,657.9
Source: IPMA

=== Human geography ===
Historical population
Year	Pop.	±%
1864	20,766	—
1878	21,990	+5.9%
1890	22,918	+4.2%
1900	26,074	+13.8%
1911	30,694	+17.7%
1920	29,762	−3.0%
1930	37,986	+27.6%
1940	45,171	+18.9%
1950	60,423	+33.8%
1960	79,964	+32.3%
1970	124,893	+56.2%
1981	226,428	+81.3%
1991	260,951	+15.2%
2001	363,749	+39.4%
2011	377,835	+3.9%
2021	385,606	+2.1%
Source: INE

The municipality is administered by 11 civil parish (Portuguese: freguesias) councils, with local authority to administer services and provide local governance, which are:

- Agualva e Mira-Sintra
- Algueirão–Mem Martins
- Almargem do Bispo, Pêro Pinheiro e Montelavar
- Cacém e São Marcos
- Casal de Cambra
- Colares
- Massamá e Monte Abraão
- Queluz e Belas
- Rio de Mouro
- São João das Lampas e Terrugem
- Sintra (Santa Maria e São Miguel, São Martinho e São Pedro de Penaferrim)

Sintra also has numerous hamlets and villages, including the affluent village of Linhó, Sintra.

Sintra's population grew considerably in the late 20th century, rising from about 14% of the Lisbon region to 19%, with the main concentration of resident population found in the important Queluz-Portela corridor, along the southeast corner of the municipality. In this area were concentrated approximately 82% of the municipality's population, the most attractive parishes to live in being São Pedro de Penaferrim, Rio de Mouro, Belas and Algueirão-Mem Martins.

The buildings in the central square of São Martinho, across from the Sintra National Palace

With the decrease in mortality rates, the region has undergone a general increase in infant births, primarily associated with late births, but also an increase in seniors in the community (56.5% in 2001). Yet Sintra is still considered to have a structurally young population, the youngest in the Greater Metropolitan Area of Lisbon. Young adults (30- to 39-year-olds) dominate Sintra's communities, with the parishes of Pêro Pinheiro, Terrugem, São Martinho, São João das Lampas, Santa Maria e São Miguel, Montelavar, Colares, Queluz and Almargem do Bispo all having higher rates of seniors in the population. Approximately 80% of the population are born outside the town, 21% of these being foreign born residents. While the resident population in Lisbon has seen a gentle decrease since the mid-1960s, Sintra has grown comparably.

Urban areas represent 55.4 square kilometres (5,540 ha) of the municipality, or approximately 17.4% of Sintra's territory; 35% of the population reside in places of between 50,000 and 100,000 inhabitants. Many of these areas are anchored to lines of access, in particular, the Sintra Line and the IC19 motorway which connects the principal towns of Queluz, Agualva-Cacém, Algueirão/Mem Martins, Rio de Mouro and Belas). Many of these urban areas are composed of a fabric of building projects that have historically resulted in dense buildings of concrete, normally seven or more floors in height. The greatest growth in residential homes has occurred in the south of the municipality, in the triangle of São Pedro de Penaferrim, Santa Maria e São Miguel and Casal de Cambra. In addition, there is a major concentration and growth in family dwellings of a seasonal nature, or second homes, in this region, and a proliferation of illegal construction in the parishes of São João das Lampas, São Pedro de Penaferrim, Belas, Agualva-Cacém and Casal de Cambra.

== Politics ==
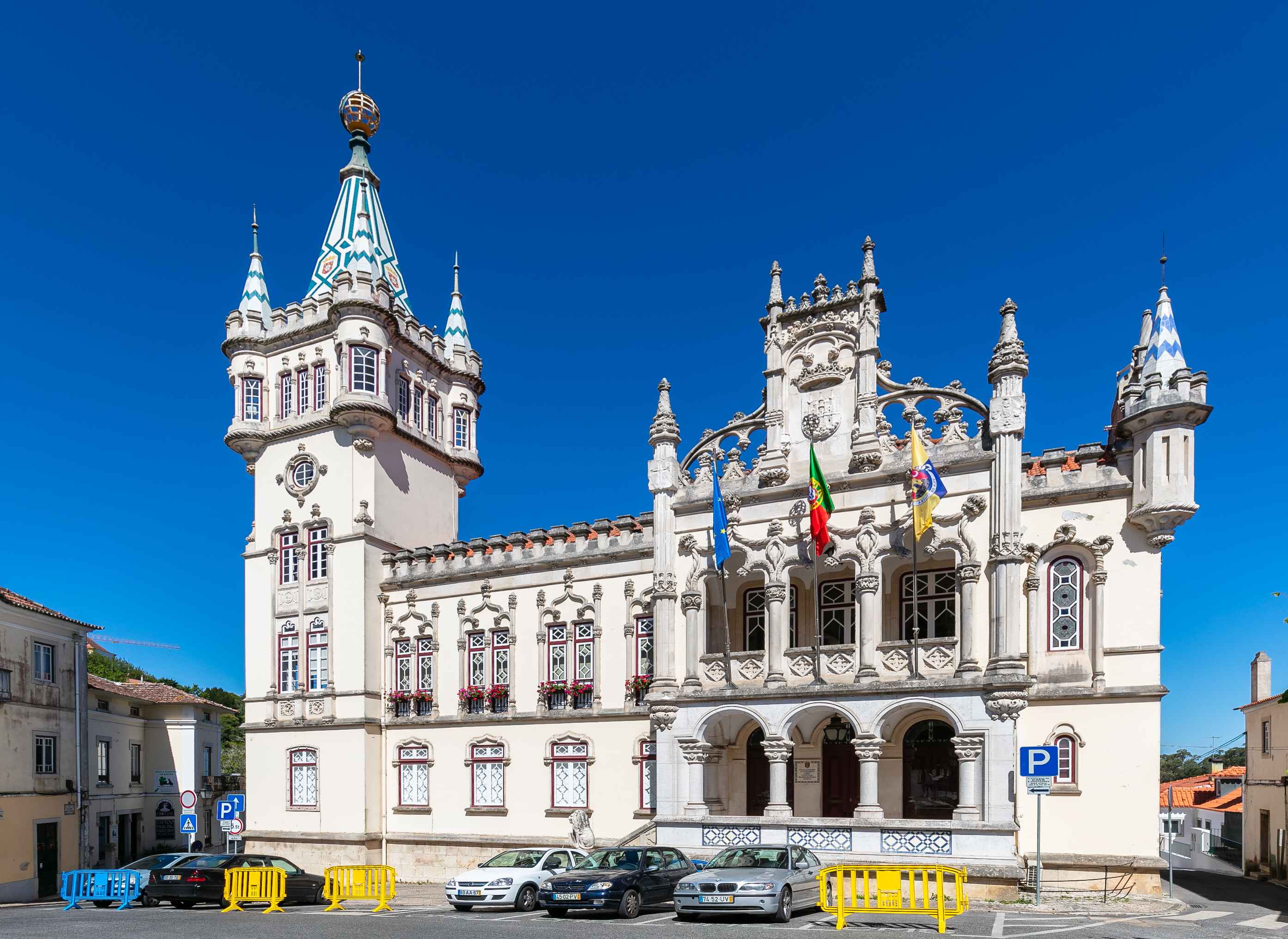
Sintra City Hall, the seat of Sintra's municipal government

Marco Almeida (PSD) is the current Mayor of Sintra since 1 November 2025, following the 2025 local elections.

=== Local election results 1976–2025 ===
Parties are listed from left-wing to right-wing.

Summary of local elections for Sintra city hall, 1976–2025
Election	GDUP	BE	PCP APU CDU	PS	PRD	PAN	MA	PSD	CDS	CH	Turnout
1976	5.3		24.9	39.6				13.2	10.9		64.6
1979			30.3	24.2				40.2			71.7
1982			31.7	30.7				32.9			71.5
1985			31.6	21.4	10.5			32.3			58.1
1989			30.1	28.2	2.0			33.1			49.5
1993			28.8	34.6				27.1	3.7		58.9
1997			23.2	48.6				18.8	3.1		51.7
2001		2.7	15.8	36.4				39.2			48.8
2005		6.5	12.4	30.9				43.5			51.3
2009		5.9	11.1	33.7				45.3			47.9
2013		4.5	12.5	26.8		1.9	25.4	13.8			40.4
2017		6.3	9.4	43.1		3.7	29.0				42.3
2021		5.8	9.0	35.3		3.3		27.5		9.1	40.1
2025		1.6	4.6	31.7		33.9			2.1	23.4	50.1
Source: Marktest

== Economy ==
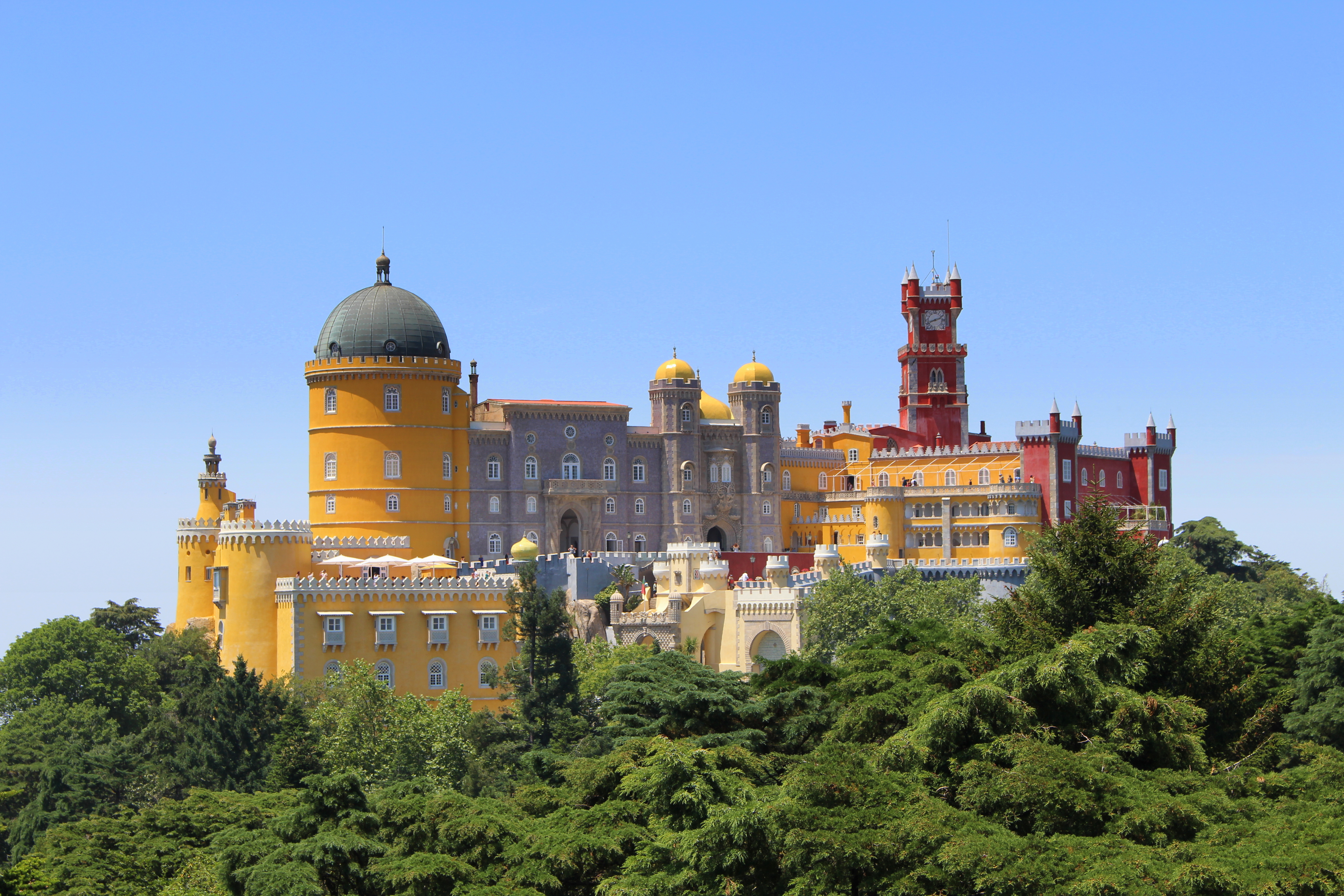
The iconic Pena National Palace originally built on the Monastery of Nossa Senhora da Pena, and renovated extensively through the initiative of Ferdinand II of Portugal

The growth in tertiary activities has played an important part in the pattern of employment in the region, with commercial, retail and support services predominating. This has been to the detriment of industry, although continuing industrial activities include the transport of materials, mineral processing, the manufacture of machinery and equipment, food-processing, beverage and tobacco companies as well as publishing and printing services. There has also been a dramatic growth in the civil construction industry.

EuroAtlantic Airways has its head office in Sintra.

Tourism is also significant, with the parks and monuments operated by the Parques de Sintra accounting for 3.2 million visitors in 2017, for example.

== Transport ==
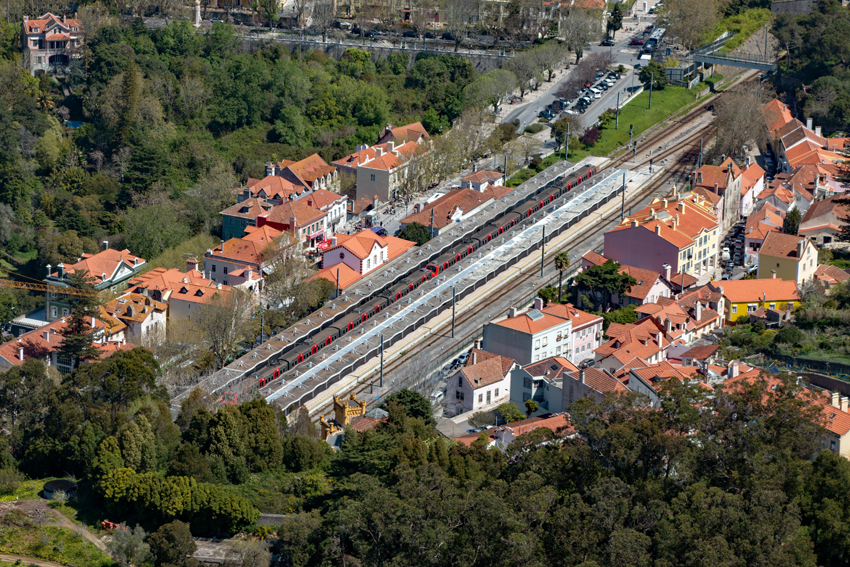
Sintra commuter railway station

Lisbon's commuter railway network (CP Urban Services) provides direct services to Sintra Station. The journey to Lisbon takes 35–45 minutes. There is alternative transport, taxis, car-sharing services and buses, covering a large area of the district.

The Sintra tramway links Sintra with the Atlantic coast at Praia das Maçãs, providing a beautiful scenic ride along the way and covering a distance of some 11.5 kilometres (7.1 mi). As of 2016, the heritage line runs Wednesday to Sunday in summer months.

Tourist bus 434 takes visitors between attractions in Sintra. The bus follows a one-way route and stops at Sintra Station, São Pedro de Sintra, the Castle of the Moors, Pena National Palace, Sintra Old Town and returns to Sintra Station.

== Landmarks ==
Cultural Landscape of Sintra
UNESCO World Heritage Site
- Interactive map of Cultural Landscape of Sintra
- Criteria: Cultural: ii, iv, v
- Reference: 723
- Inscription: 1995 (19th Session)
- Area: 946 ha (2,340 acres)

Sintra has a great number of preserved or classified architectural buildings:

=== Prehistoric ===
- Barreira Megalithic Complex
- Dolmen of Adrenunes (Portuguese: Anta de Adrenunes)
- Dolmen of Agualva (Portuguese: Anta de Agualva/Anta do Carrascal)
- Dolmen of Estria (Portuguese: Anta da Estria)
- Dolmen of Monte Abraão (Portuguese: Anta do Monte Abraão)
- Praia das Maçãs Prehistoric Monument (Portuguese: Monumento Pré-Histórico de Praia das Maçãs)
- Tholos tomb of Monge (Portuguese: Tholos do Monge)

=== Civic ===
- Aguas Livres Aqueduct-Sintra Line (Portuguese: Aqueduto das Águas Livres-Troço de Sintra)
- Biester Palace
- Chalet and Garden of the Countess of Edla
- Estate of Penha Verde (Portuguese: Quinta de Penha Verde/Quinta da Fonte del Rei)
- Mansion of Penha Verde (Portuguese: Solar da Quinta de Penha Verde)
- National Palace of Pena (Portuguese: Palácio Nacional da Pena)
- National Palace of Queluz (Portuguese: Palácio Nacional de Queluz)
- National Palace of Sintra (Portuguese: Palácio Nacional de Sintra/Palácio da Vila)
- Palacette of the Counts of Almeida-Araújo (Portuguese: Palácio Pombal/Palacete dos Condos de Almeida Araújo)
- Pillory of Colares (Portuguese: Pelourinho de Colares)
- Quinta da Regaleira including the palace and the chapel
- Quinta da Ribafria
- Monserrate Palace
- Seteais Palace
- Ramalhão Palace

=== Culture ===
- The Puppet House of Sintra (Portuguese: Casa da Marioneta de Sintra)
- Valdevinos Cultural Association (Portuguese: Valdevinos Associação Cultural)
- Ferreira de Castro Museum.

=== Military ===
- Castle of the Moors (Portuguese: Castelo dos Mouros)

=== Religious ===
- Church of Santa Maria (Portuguese: Igreja Paroquial de Santa Maria)
- Convent of Penha Longa (Portuguese: Convento de Penha Longa)
- Convento dos Capuchos
The front façade and fountain of the Queluz National Palace

A tower and adjoining walls at the Castle of the Moors

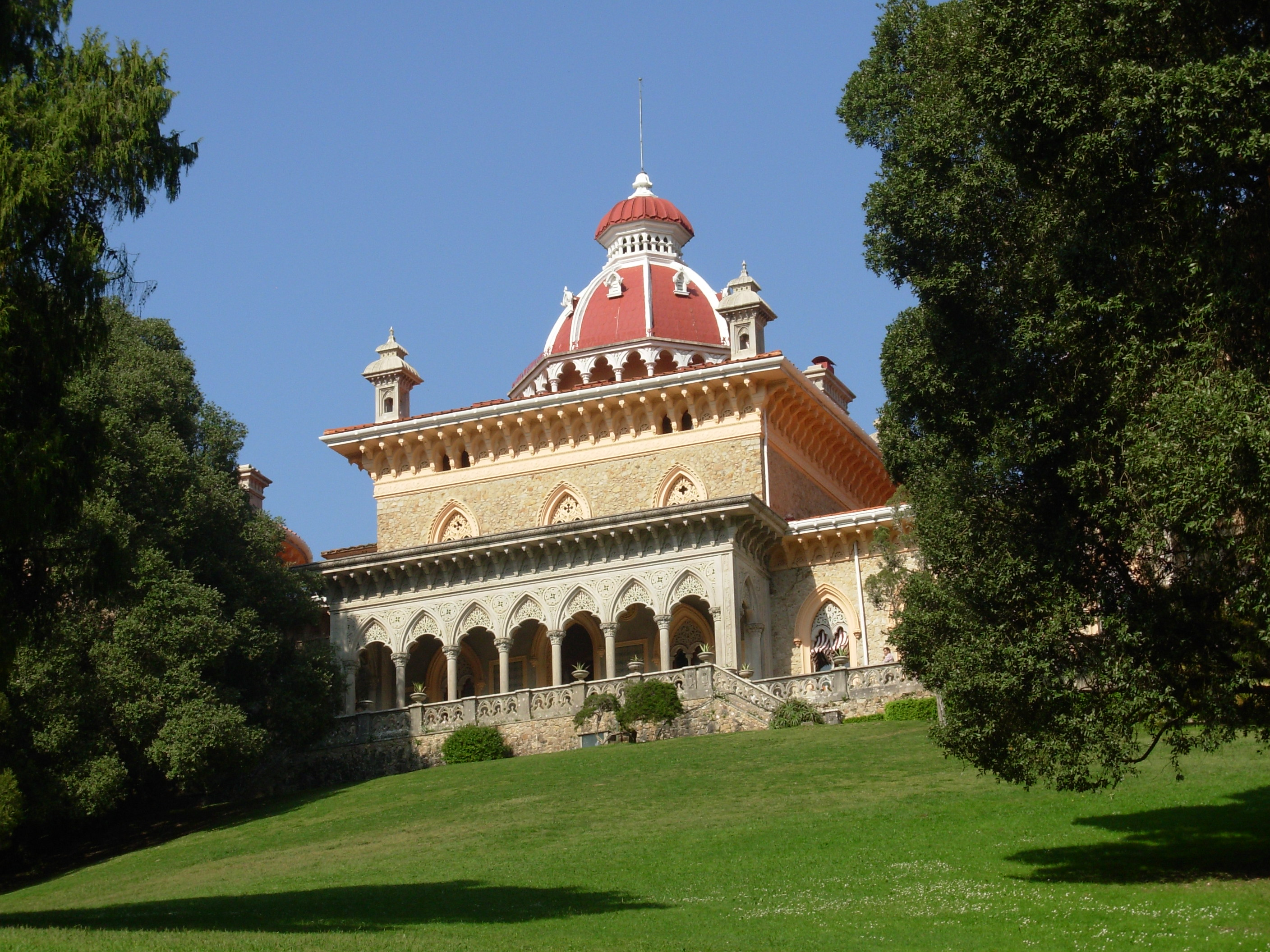
The estate of Monserrate, constructed by Gerard Devisme, but taking on its oriental appearance after Francis Cook

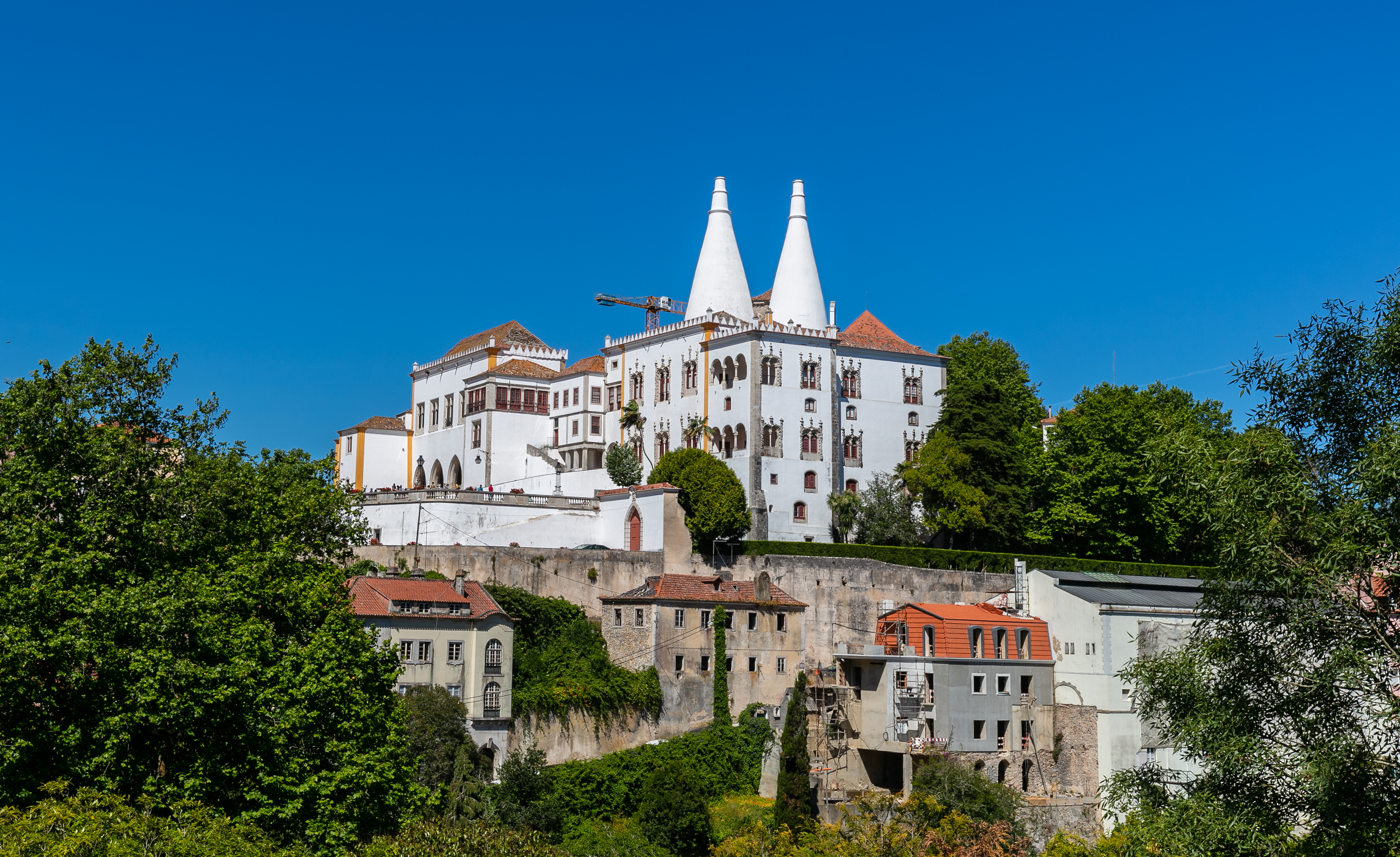
National Palace of Sintra. The best preserved medieval Royal Palace in Portugal, being inhabited more or less continuously from the early 15th century to the late 19th century.

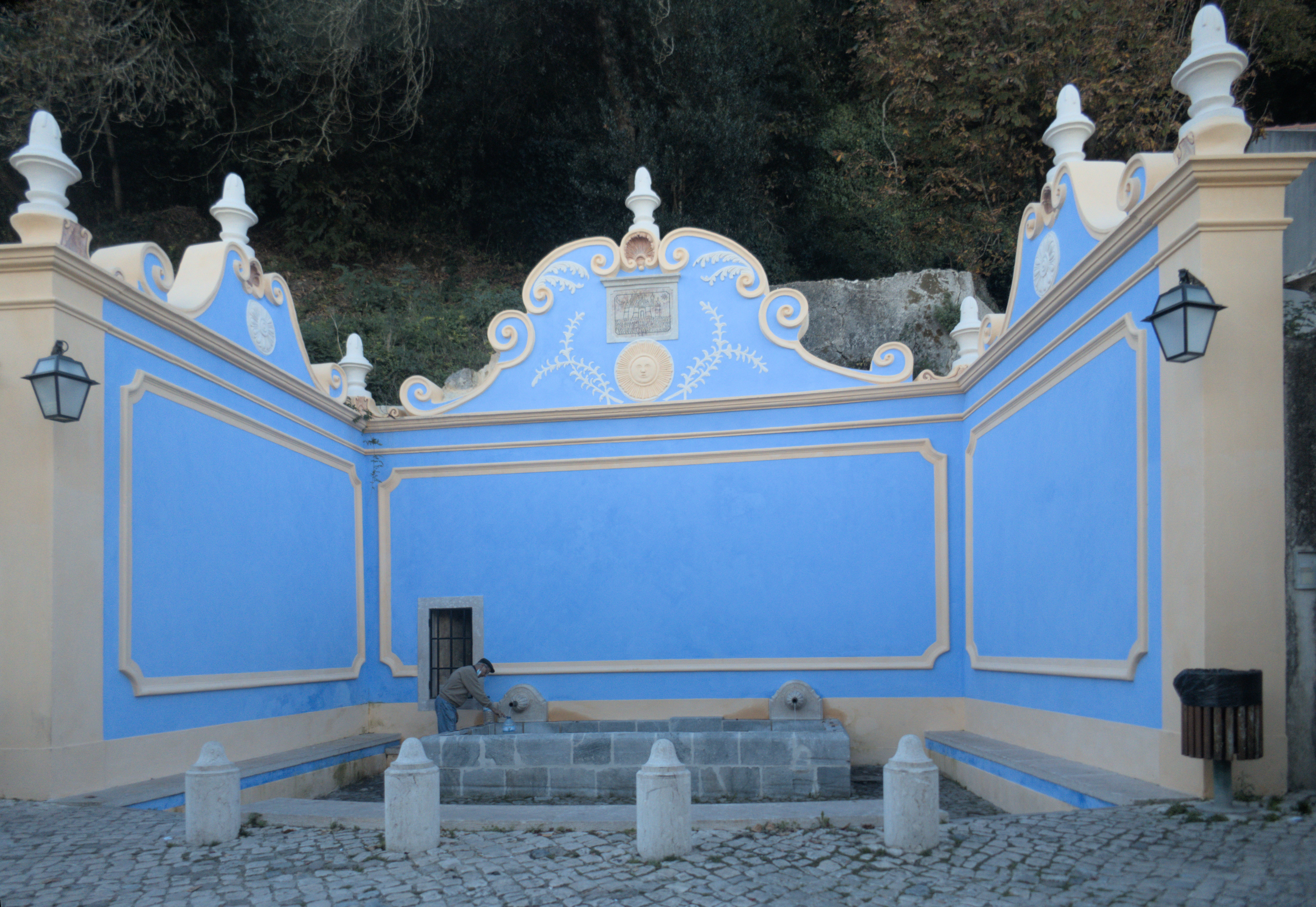
Fonte da Sabuga, Sintra

== Sports ==
The municipality of Sintra has several sports venues and a wide range of sports facilities for the practice of sports like tennis, golf, swimming, surfing, and equestrianism.

The most reputed competitive sports clubs of Sintra Municipality are:

- Sport União Sintrense, a club established on 7 October 1911 that compete in the Campeonato de Portugal, the fourth lay tier of Portuguese football
- C.A. Queluz, basketball team based in Queluz
- Hockey Club de Sintra, sports club that compete in roller hockey and cycling, being also noted for its artistic roller skating department.
- Clube Desportivo de Belas, sports club located in Queluz e Belas
- Belas Rugby Clube, rugby union team from Queluz e Belas

== In popular culture ==
- The Portuguese novelist José Maria de Eça de Queirós stayed in Lawrence's Hotel on several occasions and made reference to Sintra and the hotel in his novels, Os Maias and The Mystery of the Sintra Road.
- Much of the miniseries Gulliver's Travels (1996) was filmed in Sintra, and many of its palaces are shown.
- In 2018, a board game by German game designer Michael Kiesling, Azul: Stained Glass of Sintra, was named after the town of Sintra.
- In 1999 Biester Palace was used as a set for The Ninth Gate, directed by Roman Polanski and starring Johnny Depp. The Promise (2016) and The Count of Monte Cristo (2002) were also filmed in Sintra.

== Twin towns – sister cities ==
Sintra is twinned with:

- Assilah, Morocco
- Beira, Mozambique
- Bissau, Guinea-Bissau
- Fontainebleau, France
- Goussainville, France
- Havana, Cuba
- Honolulu, United States
- El Jadida, Morocco
- Lobito, Angola
- Namaacha, Mozambique
- Nova Sintra, Cape Verde
- Omura, Japan
- Oviedo, Spain
- Petrópolis, Brazil
- Trindade, São Tomé and Príncipe

== Notable people ==
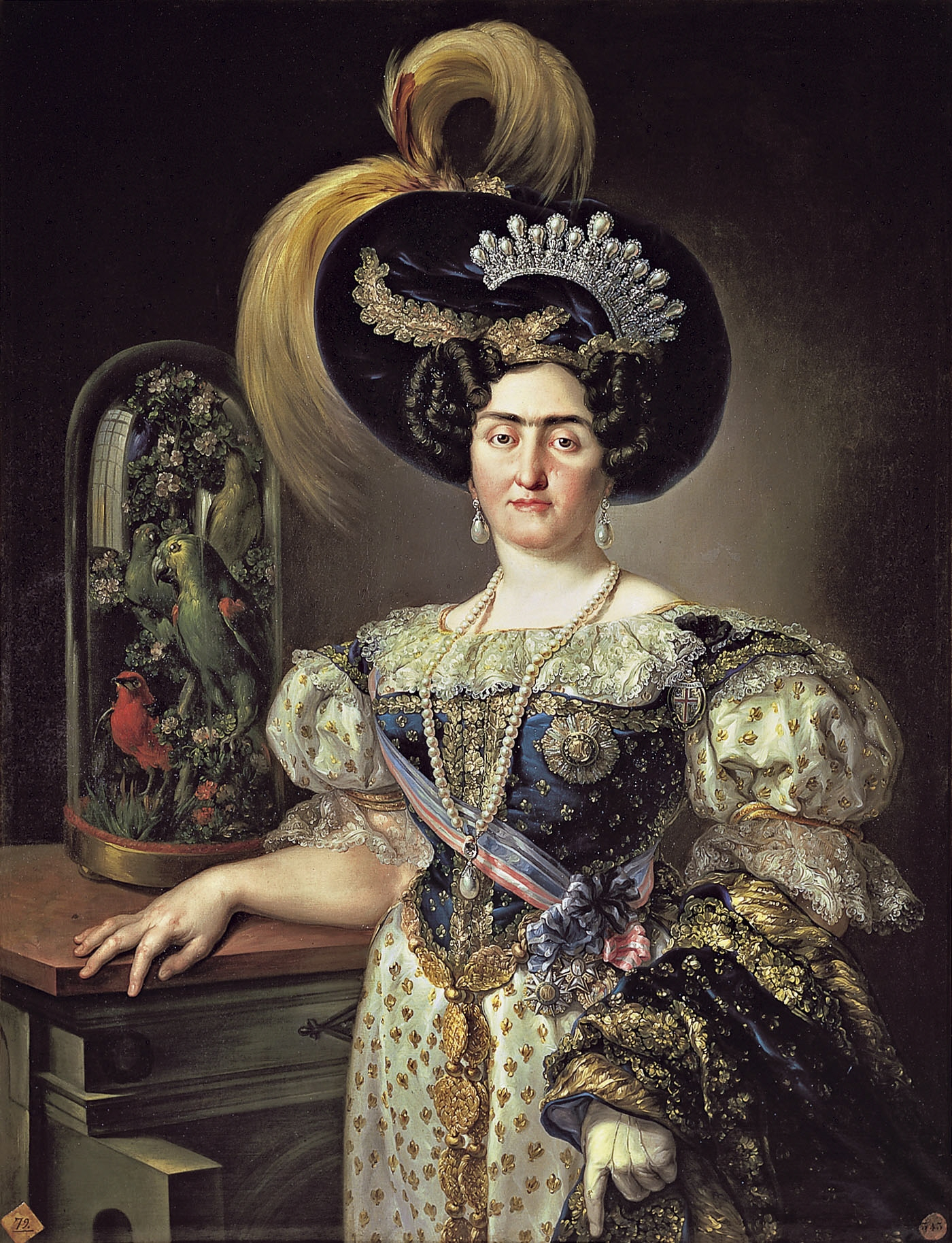
Infanta Maria Francisca of Portugal, ca.1823

- King Afonso V (1432–1481) known by the sobriquet the African, a King of Portugal.
- André de Albuquerque Ribafria (1621–1659), a Portuguese nobleman and military leader.
- Infanta Maria Francisca (1800 in Queluz – 1834), a Portuguese infanta (princess), daughter of King John VI of Portugal
- Vasco Gonçalves (1921–2005), a Portuguese army officer, participant in the Carnation Revolution, 104th Prime Minister of Portugal, 1974–1975.
- Jorge de Brito (1927 in Queluz – 2006), a businessman & 28th president of S.L. Benfica
- Clotilde Rosa (1930 in Queluz – 2017), a Portuguese harpist, pedagogue and composer.
- Ruy Belo (1933 – 1978 in Queluz), a Portuguese poet, essayist and existentialist
- Vasco Martins (born 1956 in Queluz), a Cape Verdean musician and composer
- Manuela Bravo (born 1957 in Queluz), singer, sang in the Eurovision Song Contest 1979
- Isabel Stilwell (born 1960), a Portuguese journalist and writer.
- Peter Kember (born 1965), stage name Sonic Boom, an English singer and record producer
- Zé Cabra (born 1965), a former painter and comedy-singer
- Miguel Ribeiro (born 1974) is a Portuguese screenwriter and filmmaker.

=== Sport ===
- Luis Loureiro (born 1976), a former footballer with 295 club caps and 6 for Portugal
- Ricardo Silva (born 1977 in Agualva-Cacém), a former footballer with 293 caps
- Marco Caneira (born 1979), a footballer with 326 club caps and 25 for Portugal
- Bruno Coelho (born 1987), a futsal player with 146 club caps for Benfica and 102 for Portugal
- Dolores Silva (born 1991 in Queluz), a footballer with 123 caps for the Portugal women's national football team
- Nuno Mendes (footballer, born 2002), plays for Paris Saint-Germain and the Portugal national football team

== See also ==
- Portuguese Riviera
- Queijada de Sintra
- Sintra Mountains
