= São João das Lampas e Terrugem =

- Civil parish
- Location in Portugal
- Coordinates: 38.755°N 9.255°W
- Country: Portugal
- Region: Lisbon
- Metropolitan area: Lisbon
- District: Lisbon
- Municipality: Sintra

Area
  - Total: 83.60 km^{2} (32.28 sq mi)

Population (2011)
  - Total: 16,505
  - Density: 197.4/km^{2} (511.3/sq mi)
- Time zone: UTC+00:00 (WET)
  - Summer (DST): UTC+01:00 (WEST)

São João das Lampas e Terrugem is a civil parish that is located in the municipality of Sintra, Lisbon District, Portugal. It was formed in 2013 by the merger of the former parishes of São João das Lampas and Terrugem. The population in 2011 was 16,505, in an area of 83.60 km².
