= Anta de Agualva =

Megalithic site near Agualva, Portugal

- Anta do Carrascal
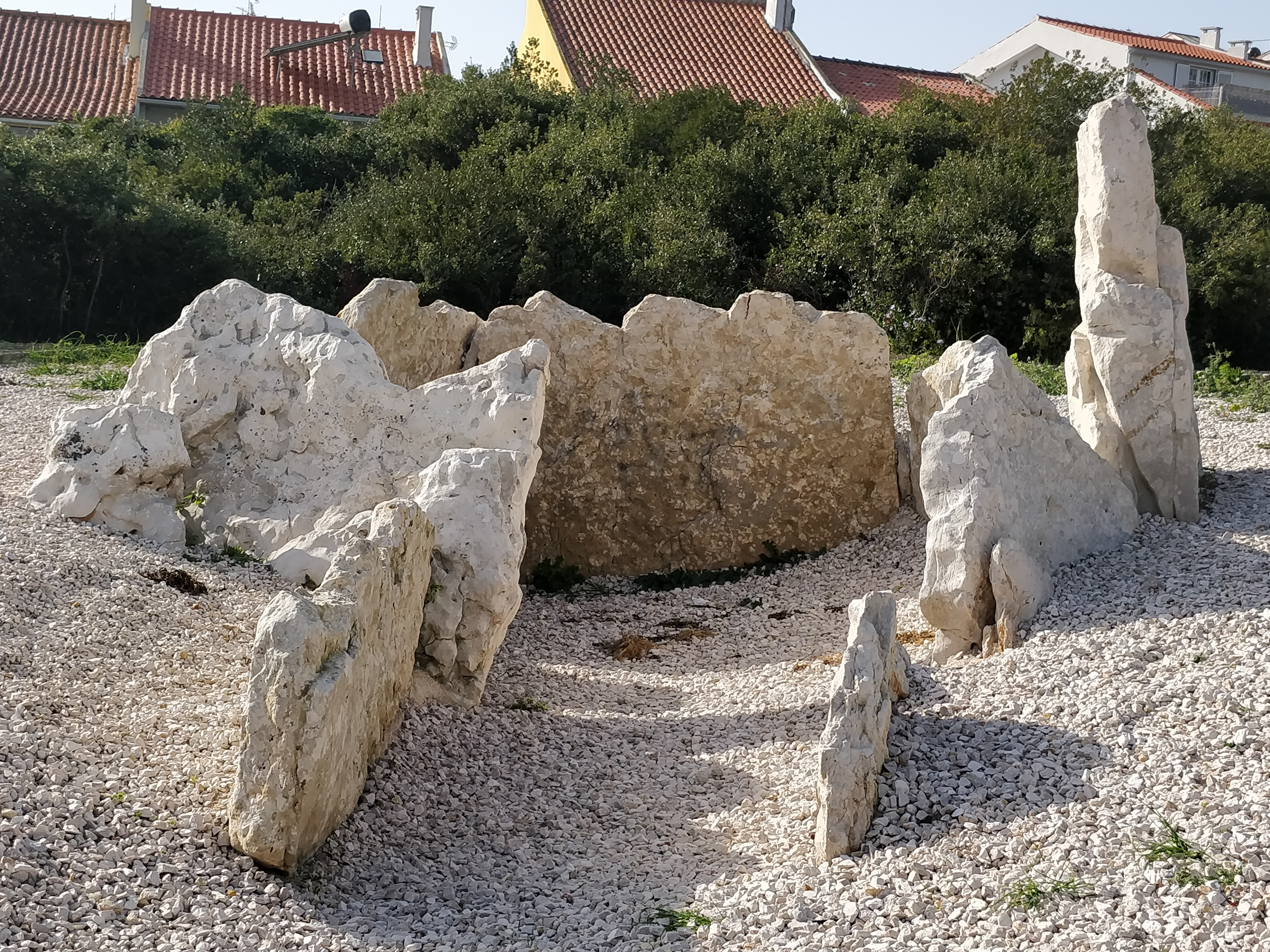
- The dolmen in 2019
- Interactive map of Anta de Agualva
- 38°46′24″N 9°17′13″W
- Type: Dolmen
- Periods: Late Neolithic
- Location: Agualva-Cacém, Sintra, Lisbon District, Portugal

History
- Built: c. 3250 BC

Site notes
- Archaeologists: Carlos Ribeiro (1875); Georg and Vera Leisner (1944); Veiga Ferreira (1958)
- Discovered: 1875 by Carlos Ribeiro
- Condition: Recently restored
- Owner: Public
- Public access: Yes

The Anta de Agualva, also known as the Anta do Carrascal, is a megalithic dolmen situated in an urban area of Agualva-Cacém in the municipality of Sintra, in the Lisbon District of Portugal. First identified by Carlos Ribeiro in 1875, the dolmen has recently been restored and can be easily visited.

The dolmen is believed to have been made up of a polygonal chamber measuring 3.7 × 3.8 meters and formed by seven vertical stones (orthostats), together with an access corridor. Three large blocks have also been identified that may be fragments of the stone that covered the tomb. A few archaeological fragments were found at the site and they are now deposited in Lisbon's Geological Museum but many more were believed to have been taken prior to Ribeiro's excavations. The artifacts collected, as well as more recent radiocarbon dating, suggest that the chamber was used in the Late Neolithic period between the middle and end of the 4th millennium BC. Later, in the second half of the 3rd millennium or in the second millennium, additional funerary deposits may have been made in the access corridor.

The Anta de Agualva was first identified in 1875 by military engineer and geologist Carlos Ribeiro who excavated this site as well as several other dolmens in the area to the northeast of Lisbon, such as the Anta da Estria, Anta da Pedra dos Mouros, Anta das Pedras Grandes, and Anta do Monte Abraão. The dolmen was registered as a national monument in 1910. In 1944, Georg and Vera Leisner drew up a new plan of the monument similar to that of Ribeiro but, in their case, assuming the existence of a significant tumulus. Further excavations were carried out in 1958 by Veiga Ferreira.

The conservation of the monument has always presented problems related to the lack of clearance of the bush and to urban pressure. In 1994, the Archaeological Museum of São Miguel de Odrinhas carried out a set of actions to safeguard the monument, including clearance of the area. In 2004, a park was inaugurated, denominated "Jardim da Anta" (Garden of the Anta), with the dolmen integrated in the landscaping. In 2017, at the initiative of Sintra City Council, work was carried out on the preservation and restoration of the monument and it was formally opened in April of that year.
