= Georg and Vera Leisner =

German archaeologists

Vera Leisner and Octávio da Veiga Ferreira inside the western chamber of the Praia das Maçãs Prehistoric Monument in 1961

Georg and Vera Leisner were married German prehistorians and archaeologists who, after becoming a lieutenant colonel and a nurse, spent many years studying fourth and third millennia BCE megalithic sites in Iberia. The work of the Leisners is widely acknowledged as one of the most important contributions to the study of the megalithic phenomenon in Iberia. They produced numerous publications on this topic, almost all published jointly, which remain the classic reference works on the Portuguese and Spanish megalithic. They developed a systematic method of research based on direct observation, drawings and photographs, coupled with the discussion of available sources. Over several decades, they visited, studied and described hundreds of megalithic monuments throughout Spain and Portugal. Vera Leisner (born Amanda Vera de la Camp) was born in New York on 4 February 1885 and died in Hamburg on 31 May 1972. Her husband, who was fifteen years older, was born in Kiel on 2 September 1870 and died in Stuttgart on 20 September 1957.

== Early lives ==
Vera Leisner's father was a businessman in the import-export trade and was based in New York at the time of her birth. Her mother died in childbirth at the age of 25 when Vera was two years old. She then lived with her grandmother in Hamburg for eight years until her father remarried, when she returned to New York for one year, also visiting Japan. In 1898 the family returned to Hamburg, where Vera attended a local school and then a boarding school in Eisenach. As usual for girls at the time, the focus of her education was the study of music and painting.

Georg Leisner's father came from a merchant family in Eckernförde to the northwest of Kiel. His mother came from an old family of Kiel master craftsmen. Georg spent his childhood in Kiel, where he completed pre-university studies in 1891. In the same year he joined the Bavarian Army. In 1900 and 1901 he took part in the campaigns that followed the Boxer Rebellion in China and in 1904 and 1905 was involved in the "war" against the Herero people in German South West Africa, now Namibia.

The couple married on 2 September 1909 and lived in Munich. At that time, archaeological research was far from their thoughts. During the First World War Vera worked as a nurse in a military hospital in Munich, while her husband was an officer at the Front. After the war Georg retired from the army at the age of 48 with the rank of lieutenant colonel and the two purchased a small farm in the village of Hohenberg an der Eger in Bavaria, although they had no prior experience of farming. In 1924-25 they undertook a seven-month trip to Italy, selling the farm on their return. The trip to Italy seems to have been the spur for their interest in archaeology.

== Professional development ==
Between 1924 and 1928 Georg Leisner collaborated with the Frobenius Institute of Cultural Morphology at the University of Frankfurt am Main and in 1926, possibly also with Vera, took part in Leo Frobenius's eighth expedition to Africa, to the Nubian desert, to examine the architecture and document rock paintings of the area.

Returning to Bavaria after the trip to Italy, the couple made acquaintance with Hugo Obermaier, a distinguished prehistorian and anthropologist and professor at the Complutense University of Madrid. He suggested that Georg study prehistory and he enrolled at the Ludwig-Maximilians-Universität München in 1927. However, he soon moved to the Department of Prehistory and Early History at the University of Marburg, where the first German chair of prehistoric archaeology was created in 1928. Vera also wanted to enroll but had never completed her bachelor's degree and first needed to comply with its requirements. By the time she entered the university, Georg was already studying megalithic tombs and had developed a plan to do his doctorate on such tombs on the Iberian Peninsula.

They travelled together to northwest Spain, where they worked in partnership with the local archaeologist Carlos Cerdán Márquez, and Portugal for seven months in 1929–30 to carry out the research, Vera doing drawings of the graves and also learning photography. In 1928, at the age of 62, Georg earned his doctorate on megalithic tombs in the Spanish region of Galicia, under the supervision of Gero von Merhart. Since Vera had not yet graduated, they were faced with a choice of whether she should first obtain a degree or begin field work with her husband immediately. They chose the latter. They travelled for seven months in 1929 and 1930 through the Iberian Peninsula, including the Algarve in Portugal, where they visited the Megalithic Monuments of Alcalar. This was where the idea of a series of publications on the megalithic tombs of the Iberian Peninsula is believed to have emerged. Vera's lack of a doctorate and the fact that, at the time, archaeology was a male-dominated discipline, may explain why, in later life, Georg was very concerned to secure her rights to their work after his death. He was fully aware that fellow archaeologists considered her to be his assistant rather than his partner.

== Working life ==
The Leisners travelled three times to the south of the Iberian Peninsula up to 1934 to study and document all megalithic tombs in Iberia. Initially they carried out their work without any financial support. While they received advice and moral support from Hugo Obermaier, who at the time was living in Madrid, and from Gero von Merhart at Marburg University, only the second and third journeys to Spain were funded by the forerunner of the German Research Foundation (DFG). Initially working in southern Spain, they began systematic mapping of the megalithic tombs of Andalusia. In the process they also met the most important contemporary specialists on the Neolithic of the Iberian Peninsula. They made contact with the Belgian-Spanish archaeologist Luis Siret y Cels and with the ailing British archaeologist George Edward Bonsor Saint Martin, whose widow subsequently gave them access to his records. While working in Portugal they met with the Portuguese archaeologist José Leite de Vasconcelos, who had also been working in Galicia.

Fieldwork in southern Spain was followed in 1932 by research in northwestern Spain and in Portugal. Here they found that the results of earlier excavations remained unpublished and plans of the tombs were missing. In the couple's travels over many years they visited the sites of megalithic graves, drew new plans and discovered many hundreds of sites that had been completely unknown to archaeologists. With limited resources they had to rely on their network of contacts to provide local connections and logistical support and accommodation for the numerous journeys made by train, bus, car, horse wagon, donkey, mule, bicycle or on foot.

With the outbreak of the Spanish Civil War they were forced to return to Germany, where they produced the first volume, "The South," of the planned work, "The Megalithic Tombs of the Iberian Peninsula" (Die Megalithgräber der Iberischen Halbinsel), which was published in the middle of World War II. It covered the Spanish provinces of Guadalajara, Teruel, Valencia, Murcia, Almeria, Granada, Malaga, Cordoba, Seville, Cadiz and Huelva as well as the Portuguese region of the Algarve. Its impact was initially limited due to the fact that it was in German, there were distribution constraints and many copies were lost at the end of the war.

The war also made it difficult to get an exit visa from Germany, which they did not obtain until 1943. This enabled them to carry out fieldwork in Portugal. They were in Portugal when they learned that their Munich apartment had been destroyed by an Allied bombing raid, with the loss of important documents and research material. As a consequence they decided to stay in Portugal's capital, Lisbon, where they lived until their respective deaths. What was expected to be a two-month visit, for which they had a visa, was repeatedly extended, but not without some problems with the Portuguese security authorities.

This was a time of considerable economic hardship but the Instituto de Alta Cultura (Institute of High Culture) of the Ministry of Education gave them some research assignments and, for a time, they also had a scholarship from the Siemens company. However, the available funds only allowed them to carry out fieldwork for one or two months in a year. In 1945 the Director of the Faculty of Sciences of the University of Coimbra made a formal invitation to Georg to work with the university, which he accepted. However, the invitation had to be cancelled because the government did not approve the contract as Germany, close to surrender at the end of the Second World War, did not have a "legally organized internal government before whom the subjects of that Nation [could] be held responsible for any public act".

The Madrid office of the German Archaeological Institute (DAI) was reopened in 1954. This led to a grant to the Leisners from the German Research Foundation (DFG), which enabled them to disseminate their findings in Spanish and Portuguese and to publish the second volume of their work on megalithic tombs in Iberia in 1959. They were in regular correspondence with leading archaeologists, including the Australian V. Gordon Childe, who recognised, in particular, their work on the Bell Beaker Culture. After the death of Georg in 1958, Vera, who in Georg's later years had already been carrying out the bulk of the research work, continued the research in collaboration with leading Portuguese archaeologists. She was awarded an honorary doctorate at the University of Freiburg in Germany in 1960. She published the third volume in 1965. While preparing the fourth volume, she died in Hamburg in 1972. She had been professionally active until close to her death. In 1969 she had been part of a team excavating the Praia das Maças site near Colares in Portugal.

== Scientific estate ==
The unfinished fourth volume was finally published in 1998, following considerable input from Philine Kalb. Vera Leisner donated her scientific estate to the Madrid office of the DAI with the special request that it should remain in Portugal. It initially formed the basis for the establishment of a DAI branch in Lisbon. When this closed in 1999, the collection was transferred by loan to the Portuguese state. Today, the "Leisner Archive" is housed in the Direção-Geral do Património Cultural (DGPC) at the Palace of Ajuda in Lisbon. The archive includes around 49,500 documents, nearly 19,000 written and 30,500 drawings and photographs that were accumulated by the couple during their research on the Iberian Peninsula. Most are from 1943 onwards, although some earlier items were also found, including their wedding invitation. Some remain uncatalogued as, in spite of the precision with which the Leisners did their work, some photographs are unidentified and there are photographs of monuments where the location is unknown. The utility of the collection is enhanced by the fact that the Leisners kept a copy of every letter they wrote. With support from the Calouste Gulbenkian Foundation the items were listed, catalogued, indexed, treated and scanned in 2012–13 to make them available for web dissemination.

It is rare today to find anything related to surface megalithism in Portugal that the Leisners had not already identified. In Portugal alone they identified some 4,000 monuments. The archive allows researchers to appreciate the systematic way they compiled and published information, both from their own fieldwork and from other sources. This made it possible to understand their reasoning. Besides photographs, their drawing of plans of tombs (mostly dolmen) can still be used today. Some are especially useful as the structures have since been destroyed. The same observations can be made about photographs and drawings of artifacts, grouped by each tomb studied. This systematic approach also helped to situate Portuguese archaeology within broader European discussions about megalithic tombs.

== See also ==
Locations studied and recorded by the Leisners include:

- Anta do Alto da Toupeira
- Anta de Agualva
- Dolmen of Guadalperal
- Antas do Olival da Pêga
- Antequera Dolmens Site
- Dolmen of Carapito I
- Anta de Carcavelos
- Great Dolmen of Comenda da Igreja
- Anta da Vidigueira
