= Nossa Senhora do Bispo (Montemor-o-Novo) =

- Civil parish
- Location in Portugal
- Coordinates: 38°42′26″N 8°13′16″W
- Country: Portugal
- Region: Alentejo
- Intermunic. comm.: Alentejo Central
- District: Évora
- Municipality: Montemor-o-Novo
- Established: Parish: c. 1300; Civil parish: c. 1843
- Disbanded: 2013

Area
  - Total: 121.83 km^{2} (47.04 sq mi)
- Elevation: 258 m (846 ft)

Population (2001)
  - Total: 5,411
  - Density: 44.41/km^{2} (115.0/sq mi)
- Time zone: UTC+00:00 (WET)
  - Summer (DST): UTC+01:00 (WEST)
- Postal code: 7050-355
- Area code: 266
- Website: http://www.jf-nsbispo.pt/

Nossa Senhora do Bispo is a former civil parish in the municipality of Montemor-o-Novo, Portugal. In 2013, the parish merged into the new parish Nossa Senhora da Vila, Nossa Senhora do Bispo e Silveiras. It has an area of 121.83 km^{2}, and a population of approximately 5411 inhabitants in 2001 (approximately 44 inhabitants per km^{2}). It contains the localities Fazendas do Cortiço, Ferro da Agulha and São Geraldo. The parish originated with the construction of its first parochial church around 1300.

== History ==
The origin of the civil parish is based in the construction, on the eastern part of the walled settlement, of the first parochial church in 1300 by Diocesano, Bishop of Évora. After this point, the resident population was connected to changes in the role of the Catholic Church in the region. Its name, referring to Bispo specifically, was based in the community's economic ties to the Bishop of Évora, since the canons of the Church of Santa Maria da Vila were tied to Évora's hierarchy. Between the 14th and 16th century the area around the church was occupied by residences and food cellars that collected the land rents of the region.

In 1534, the Cardinal Infante Afonso, bishop of Évora, ordered the reconstruction of the church, including its Manueline era portico (which was historically incorporated into the local logotypes). This church was still the object of public works well into the end of the 17th, beginning of the 18th, century.

Tradition suggests that in 1495, João Cidade, later canonized São João de Deus for his charitable works and founder of the Hospital of Granada (and who inspired the creation of the Order Hospitaler of São João de Deus.

The parish was the inspiration for the Porta do Bispo (Bishop's Gate), alongside the Torre do Anjo and Rua do Bispo, which connected the churchyard to the centre of the parish.

Since its early inception, from outside the walls, an arch of constant development occurred along the accessways that afforded the best conditions and water supplies. Slowly, many of the residences within the walls were abandoned for open spaces that existed outside the walled settlement, yet, the government authority included these areas.

In 1843, with the expulsion of the religious orders by the Liberal regime, the parish seat was transferred to the Convent of São João de Deus, before being transformed into a civic administration.

== Architecture ==
=== Archaeological ===
- Dolmen of Herdade das Comendas (Portuguese: Anta da Herdade das Comendas)
- Dolmen of Velada (Portuguese: Anta da Velada, na Herdade da Comenda do Coelho)
- Great Dolmen of Comenda da Igreja (Portuguese: Anta Grande da Comenda da Igreja/Anta Grande da Herdade da Comenda), is a 4th millennium B.C. Megalithic monument, located outside São Geraldo, used as a funerary mound;

=== Civic ===
- Casa do Povo of Montemor-o-Novo (Portuguese: Casa do Povo de Montemor-o-Novo)
- Font of Nossa Senhora da Conceição (Portuguese: Fonte da Nossa Senhora da Conceição)
- Font of the Cavaleiros (Portuguese: Fonte dos Cavaleiros)
- Fountain of Besugo (Portuguese: Chafariz do Besugo)
- Fountain of Rua Nova (Portuguese: Chafariz da Rua Nova)
- Residence of the Viscount of Armoreira da Torre (Portuguese: Casa do Visconde da Armoeira da Torre)
- Residence of Cogominhos de Sousa Barreto (Portuguese: Casa do Cogominhos de Sousa Barreto)
- Residence of Freires de Andrade (Portuguese: Casa dos Freires de Andrade)
- Residence of Praça Cândido dos Reis, 35 (Portuguese: Casa na Praça Cândido dos Reis, nº35)
- Residence of Rua das Fontainhas (Portuguese: Casa na Rua das Fontainhas)
- Residence of Rua de Aviz (Portuguese: Casa na Rua de Aviz)
- Residence of Rua de Lisboa, 2-4 (Portuguese: Casa na Rua de Lisboa, nº 2-4)

=== Religious ===
- Chapel of São Lázaro (Portuguese: Capela de São Lázaro)
- Chapel of Senhor dos Passos (Portuguese: Capela do Senhor dos Passos)
- Church of Santa Maria do Bispo (Portuguese: Igreja de Santa Maria do Bispo)
- Church of the Misericórdia (Portuguese: Manueline Portico of the Misericórdia Church)
- Church of Nossa Senhora do Bispo (Portuguese: Manueline Portico of Nossa Senhora do Bispo)
