= Anta da Vidigueira =

Megalithic burial tomb in Évora district, Portugal

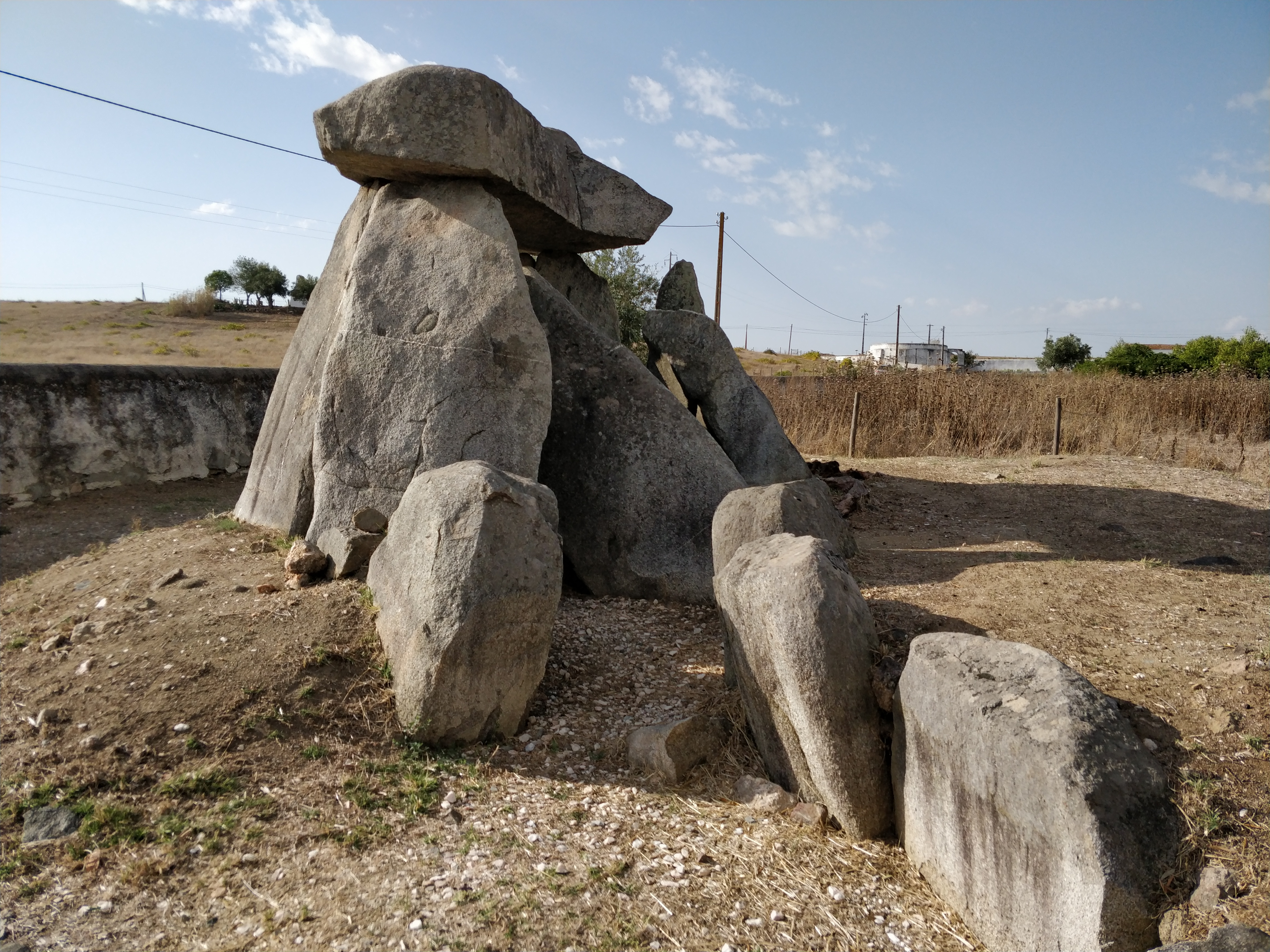
- The dolmen in 2019
- Interactive map of Anta da Vidigueira
- 38°40′35″N 7°39′34.5″W
- Type: Dolmen
- Location: Freixo, Redondo, Évora, Alentejo region, Portugal

History
- Built: c. 3000 BC

Site notes
- Material: Stone
- Height: 2.2 m (7 ft 3 in)
- Length: 4 m (13 ft) corridor
- Diameter: 3 m (9.8 ft) chamber
- Excavation dates: 2008
- Archaeologists: Rui Mataloto and Rui Boaventura
- Discovered: 1879 by Gabriel Pereira
- Condition: Good
- Public access: Yes (Gate in wall)

The Anta da Vidigueira is a megalithic dolmen or burial chamber located southwest of the village of Freixo, in Redondo municipality in the Évora district of the Alentejo region of Portugal. The dolmen was probably constructed between the Neolithic and the Chalcolithic (between the end of the fourth Millennium BCE and the first half of the third Millennium). It has been classified as a National Monument since 1910.

The Anta da Vidigueira is situated in an area with many megalithic remains, and is typical of the style of the area. About 50 such monuments have been identified throughout the municipality of Redondo, of which 30 are around the village of Freixo. It consists of a polygonal chamber of seven granite pillars of about 2.2 meters in height, with a slightly damaged capstone that has several engraved “dimples”. The tomb formed by the pillars has a diameter of about three meters. The entrance corridor, with four of the original pillars still visible, is about four meters long. Remains of a tumulus of earth and stone, which would have covered the tomb, are recognizable. The tumulus had a diameter of about eight meters. Excavations have led to finds of ceramics, blades and arrowheads.

The Anta da Vidigueira was first identified in 1879 by Gabriel Pereira. It received wider attention when Possidónio da Silva made reference to it in an 1883 publication that received national dissemination. The anta was visited by the German archaeologists Georg and Vera Leisner in March 1945. They made drawings of its plan, which they would publish in 1949, together with information about many monuments in the Redondo municipality, where they had been working on and off from 1932. However, while the Leisners made an essential contribution to the knowledge of megalithism in the municipality, they carried out no excavations at any of their monuments, probably because their attention was focused on other regions with better local logistical support. No formal excavations took place until March 2008 when 12 days of fieldwork was carried out by Rui Mataloto of the Redondo Municipality, with the assistance of archaeological students.

Although items dating back to the neolithic were discovered in the tomb, there were relatively few lithic or ceramic items identified. Lithic items seem to have been used primarily for votive reasons. Two large flint blades were found in the chamber, as well as some flint fragments in both the chamber and corridor. Four arrowheads were found in and around the corridor, two of flint and one of white quartz. Some shale necklace beads were discovered but the polished stone utensils usually found at megaliths in the Alentejo region were missing. This may, however, have been because of prior spoliation or because the site was not fully excavated. Prehistoric pottery was also relatively scarce and that found was not decorated. Pottery dating back to the Roman occupation of Portugal was also discovered.
