= Great Dolmen of Comenda da Igreja =

Dolmen in Montemor-o-Novo, Portugal

- Great Dolmen of the Military Order of the Estate
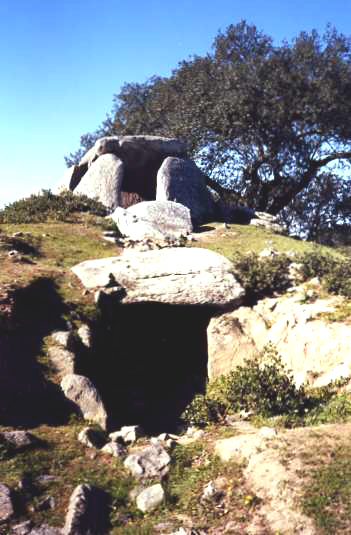
- The dolmen in 2006
- Interactive map of Great Dolmen of Comenda da Igreja
- 38°45′29″N 8°12′12″W
- Type: Dolmen
- Location: Évora, Alentejo Central, Alentejo, Portugal

History
- Built: c. 3000 BC

Site notes
- Material: Stone
- Elevation: 180 m (590 ft)
- Length: 15 m (49 ft)
- Width: 4 m (13 ft)
- Owner: Portugal
- Public access: Private Estrada Nacional EN2 (Montemor-o-Novo-Mora), approximately 2 kilometres (1.2 mi) before São Geraldo, over a small bridge, first left turn: the dolmen is located 400 metres (1,300 ft) from the EN2, along this roadway

The Great Dolmen of Comenda da Igreja (Portuguese: Anta Grande de Comenda da Igreja, or alternately Anta Grande da Herdade da Igreja) is a megalithic funerary site in the civil parish of Nossa Senhora do Bispo, in the municipality of Montemor-o-Novo, in the central Alentejo region of continental Portugal.

== History ==
Between the 4th millennium BC and the middle of the 3rd millennium BC, the site of was occupied by semi-nomadic or sedentary settlement, associated with the communities of ancient Évora.

== Architecture ==
The megalithic site, is located in an isolated area of forested brush, situated in an area of plains.

Its form extends longitudinally from west to east, composed of a central polygonal chamber roughly 4 metres (13 ft) wide, with an oblong rectangular corridor 10 metres (33 ft) long.

The articulated volumes are oriented horizontally, and covered independently in each section, with the main chamber covered by a granite slab, and the corridor by individual elements. The walls of the chamber are 6 metres (20 ft) in height, while the corridor profile is 180 centimetres (71 in) in height. Of great dimensions, the corridor is still intact and in a state of conservation.
