= Peraleda de la Mata =

- Municipality
- Flag Coat of arms

- Location in Spain
- Coordinates: 39°51′N 5°28′W
- Country: Spain
- Autonomous community: Extremadura
- Province: Cáceres
- Municipality: Peraleda de la Mata

Area
  - Total: 92 km^{2} (36 sq mi)
- Elevation: 341 m (1,119 ft)

Population (2025-01-01)
  - Total: 1,444
  - Density: 16/km^{2} (41/sq mi)
- Time zone: UTC+1 (CET)
  - Summer (DST): UTC+2 (CEST)

Peraleda de la Mata is a municipality located in the province of Cáceres, Extremadura, Spain. According to the 2014 census, the municipality has a population of 1420 inhabitants.

== Location ==
It is situated in the province limit between Cáceres and Toledo, at about 170 km of Madrid and is accessed from (A-5) highway.

== Local economy ==
The base of the economy is agricultural and livestock, dominated by the sheep. Recently, people have driven modernization with the creation of a large industrial park adjacent to the A-5.

== Main sights ==
- Dolmen of Guadalperal

== See also ==
- List of municipalities in Cáceres
