= Anta do Alto da Toupeira =

Megalithic site near Loures, Portugal

- Anta de Salemas
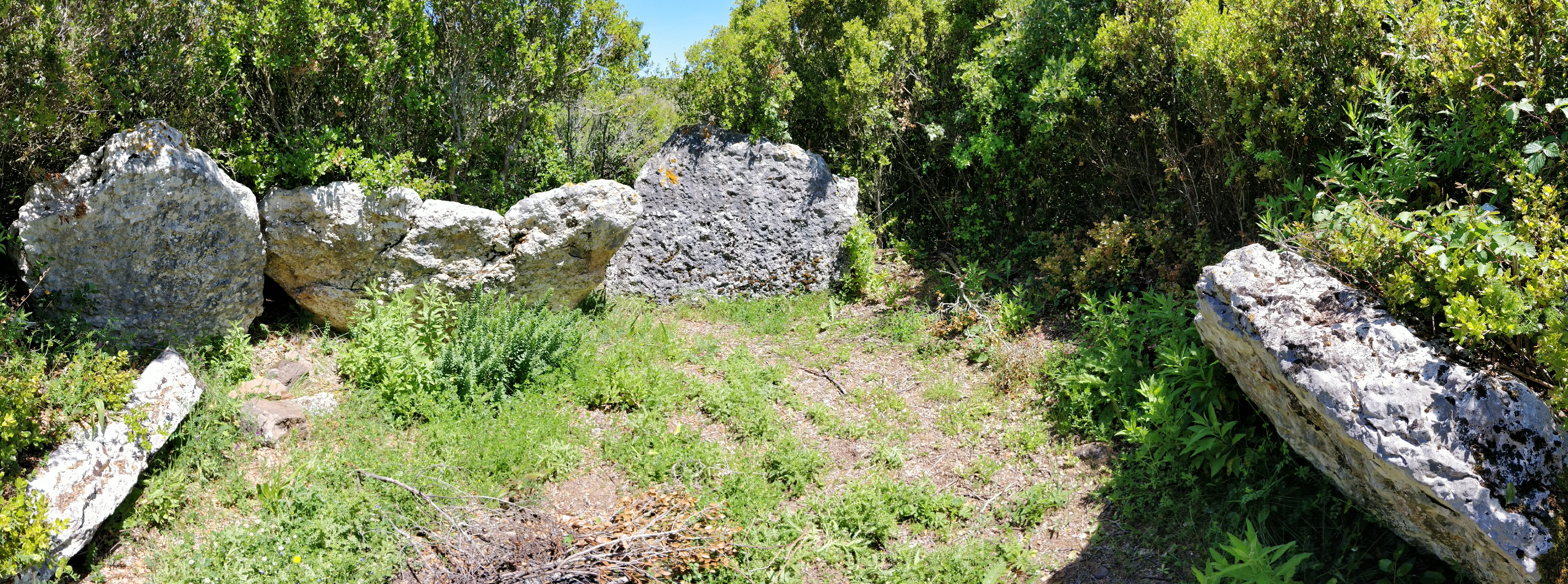
- Anta do Alto da Toupeira
- Interactive map of Anta do Alto da Toupeira
- 38°52′28″N 9°12′10″W
- Type: Dolmen
- Periods: Chalcolithic
- Location: Loures, Lisbon District, Portugal

Site notes
- Length: 5.5 m (18 ft)
- Width: 5 m (16 ft)
- Excavation dates: 1944; 1959
- Archaeologists: Georg and Vera Leisner; Vera Leisner and O. V. Ferreira
- Discovered: Unknown
- Public access: Yes

The Anta do Alto da Toupeira, also called the Anta da Toupeira or the Anta de Salemas, is a Neolithic dolmen, or megalithic tomb, situated in the parish of Lousa in the municipality of Loures, in the Lisbon District of Portugal. It dates back to the Chalcolithic.

The Anta is hidden by a clump of trees about 100 metres to the south of the Cave of Salemas. It is one of several archaeological sites within the same area, including the cave. Although probably identified by the 19th-century Portuguese archaeologist, Carlos Ribeiro, it was first studied and drawn on 17 January 1944 by the German archaeologists, Georg and Vera Leisner, but no excavations were carried out until November 1959 when Vera Leisner and O. V. Ferreira made some limited excavations and corrected the previous plan. These led them to describe the dolmen as a polygonal chamber necropolis without the usual entrance corridor associated with similar dolmens in the area. They estimated its dimensions as being 5.5 metres by 5 metres, with a maximum height of two metres. Five limestone slabs of the Late Cretaceous epoch survive on the site, one of which is believed to have been the roof of the tomb. Although further research has yet to be carried out, other archaeologists believe that further excavation could result in the discovery of an access corridor.

Excavations have yielded a number of findings but archaeologists are confused as to whether these came from the Anta, from the cave, or, indeed, from a second Anta, which appears to be referred to by the Leisners but has not since been identified. Items found have included a cylindrical idol, an axe of amphibole, a copper chisel, a copper arrowhead, and a pendant. These items are kept at Lisbon’s Geological Museum (Museu Geológico).
