= Nossa Senhora da Vila, Nossa Senhora do Bispo e Silveiras =

- Civil parish
- Location in Portugal
- Coordinates: 38.647°N 8.214°W
- Country: Portugal
- Region: Alentejo
- Intermunic. comm.: Alentejo Central
- District: Évora
- Municipality: Montemor-o-Novo

Area
  - Total: 419.49 km^{2} (161.97 sq mi)

Population (2011)
  - Total: 11,568
  - Density: 28/km^{2} (71/sq mi)
- Time zone: UTC+00:00 (WET)
  - Summer (DST): UTC+01:00 (WEST)

Nossa Senhora da Vila, Nossa Senhora do Bispo e Silveiras is a civil parish in the municipality of Montemor-o-Novo, Portugal. It was formed in 2013 by the merger of the former parishes Nossa Senhora da Vila, Nossa Senhora do Bispo and Silveiras. The population in 2011 was 11,568, in an area of 419.49 km^{2}.
