= Dolmen of Guadalperal =

Megalithic monument in Spain

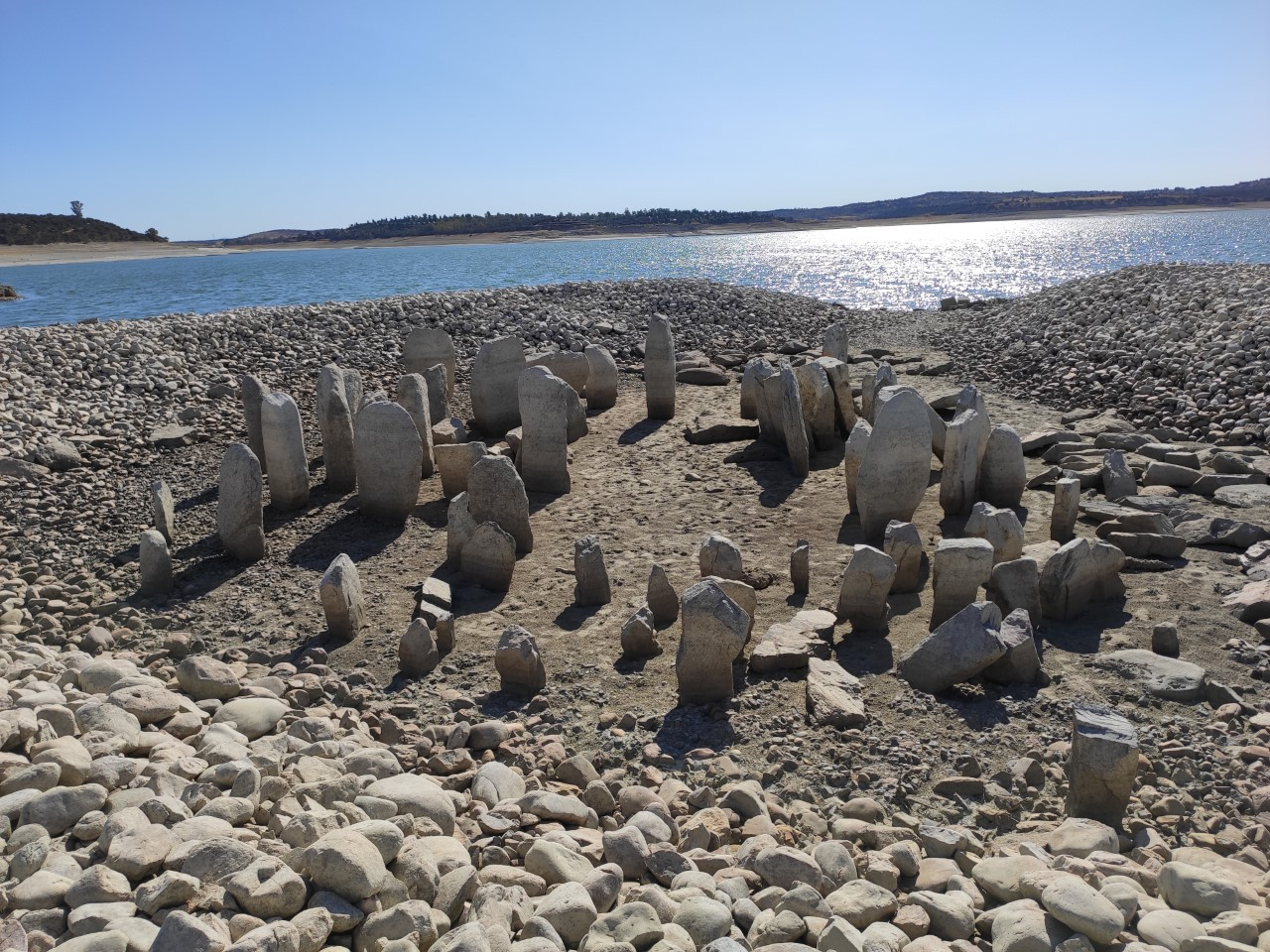
- The Dolmen of Guadalperal completely visible due to a low water level in the Valdecañas reservoir

- Location in Extremadura, Spain

General information
- Location: Valdecañas reservoir, Extremadura, Spain
- Coordinates: 39°49′54″N 5°24′10″W
- Years built: c. 3000 BC

Technical details
- Material: Granite

The Dolmen of Guadalperal, also known as the Treasure of Guadalperal and as the Spanish Stonehenge for its resemblance to the English Stonehenge, is a megalithic monument dating from around 3000 BC. It is located in Peraleda de la Mata, a town in the region of Campo Arañuelo in eastern Extremadura, Spain. The monument is within the Valdecañas reservoir in the Tagus River and is only visible when the water level allows it.

== Description and history ==
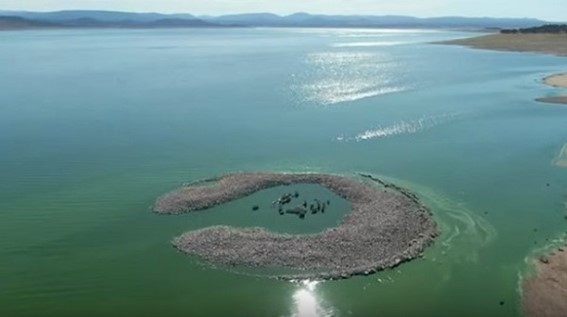
The Dolmen of Guadalperal, partly submerged

The dolmen consists of 150 granite stones, called orthostats, placed in a vertical arrangement to form an ovoid chamber 5 metres (16 ft) in diameter. They are preceded by an access corridor about 21 metres (69 ft) long and 1.4 metres (4.6 ft) wide. At the end of the corridor, at the entrance of the chamber, there is a menhir about two metres high that has carving that might be a snake and several cups. It may be a representation of the river. These figures may have served as protection for the site. The chamber, of the Anta (architecture) type, a common construction in the west of the Iberian Peninsula, consists of 140 stones and was covered with a mound of earth and gravel. It is surrounded by another circular ring that contained the upper mound.

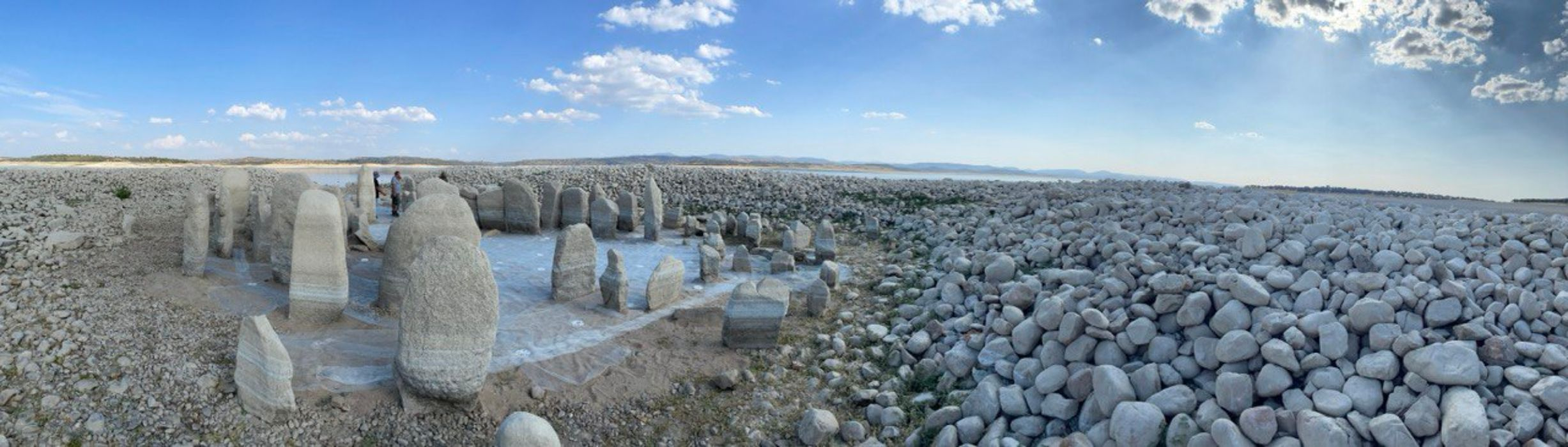
Dolmen of Guadalperal panorama

According to the latest research, the menhir carved with an elongated and wavy engraving is believed to be a representation of the Tagus River as it passes through the area.

The monument was discovered in 1926, during a research and excavation campaign led by the German archaeologist Hugo Obermaier between 1925 and 1927. It could have been a solar temple, and also been used as a burial enclave. Roman remains found there – a coin, ceramic fragments, and a grinding stone – indicate that at that time it was safely preserved from looting. Eleven axes, ceramics, flint knives, and a copper punch were found in a nearby dump. A settlement was also found, dating to the time of construction, which presumably housed the builders. Obermaier discovered houses, charcoal and ash stains, pottery, mills, and stones to sharpen axes.

In 1963, construction of the Valdecañas reservoir inundated the monument; and thus, it is only visible when water levels are low. Drought conditions in the last decade have exposed the monument in several summers.

The inundation has caused irreparable damage to the monument by eroding the stones and their engravings. Hugo Obermaier's team made reproductions of the engravings, which were published in 1960 by German archaeologists Georg and Vera Leisner. The Raices de Peraleda association is requesting its recovery due to the deterioration observed.

The structure was seen fully for the first time in 50 years in July 2019, when a NASA satellite photograph during a drought revealed its 150 stones.

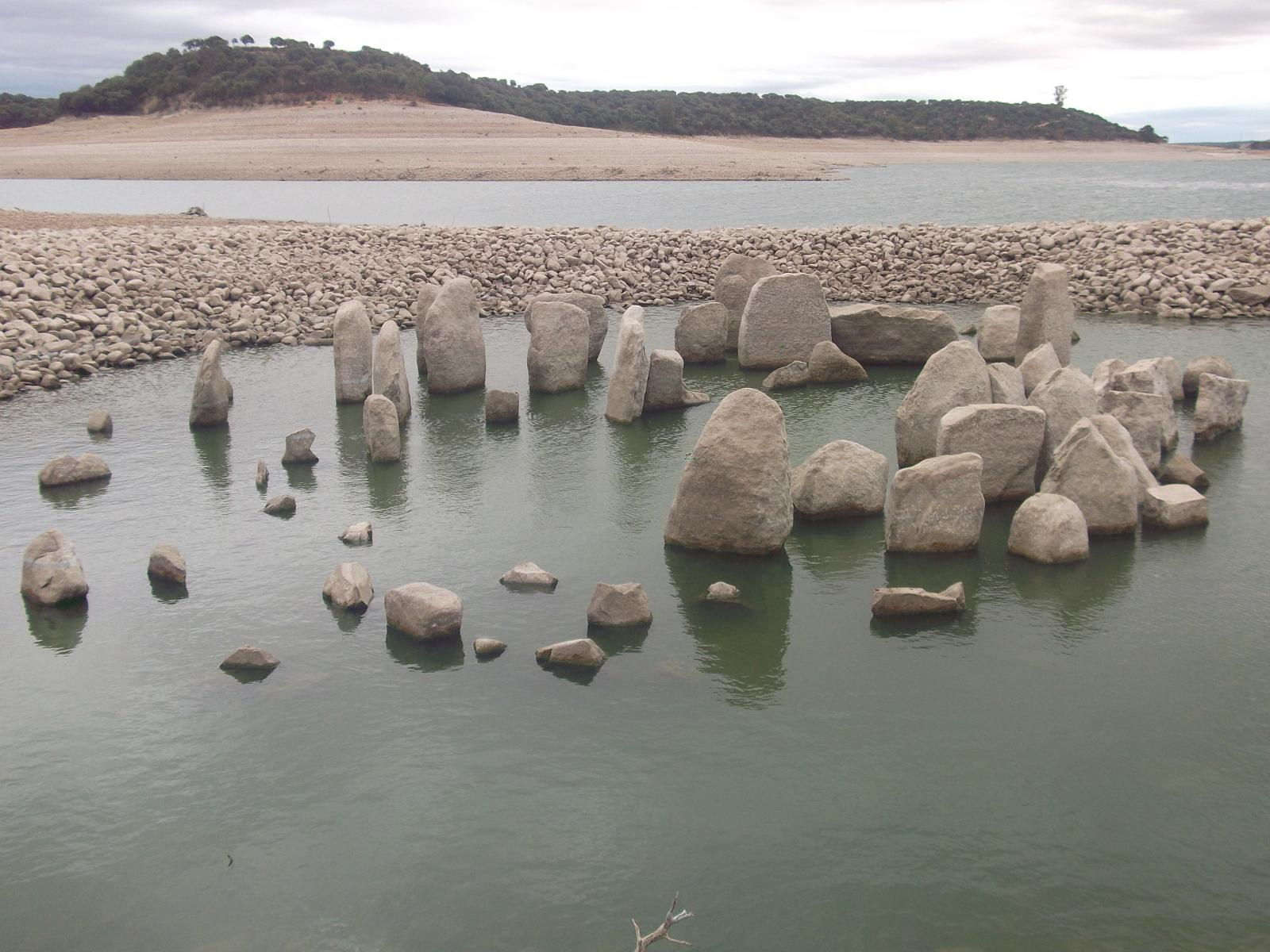
Partially visible Guadalperal dolmen during summer 2012

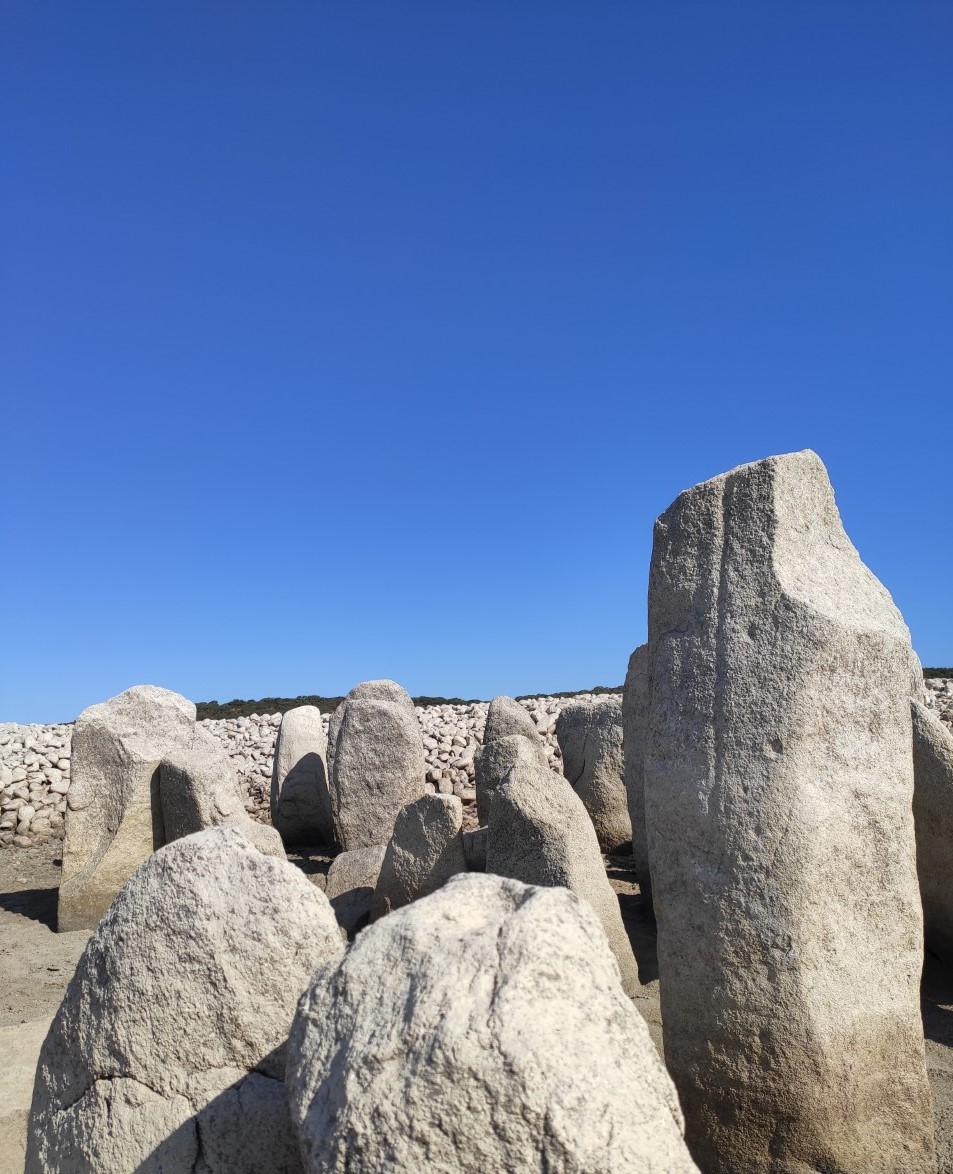
Front view of sculpted menhir

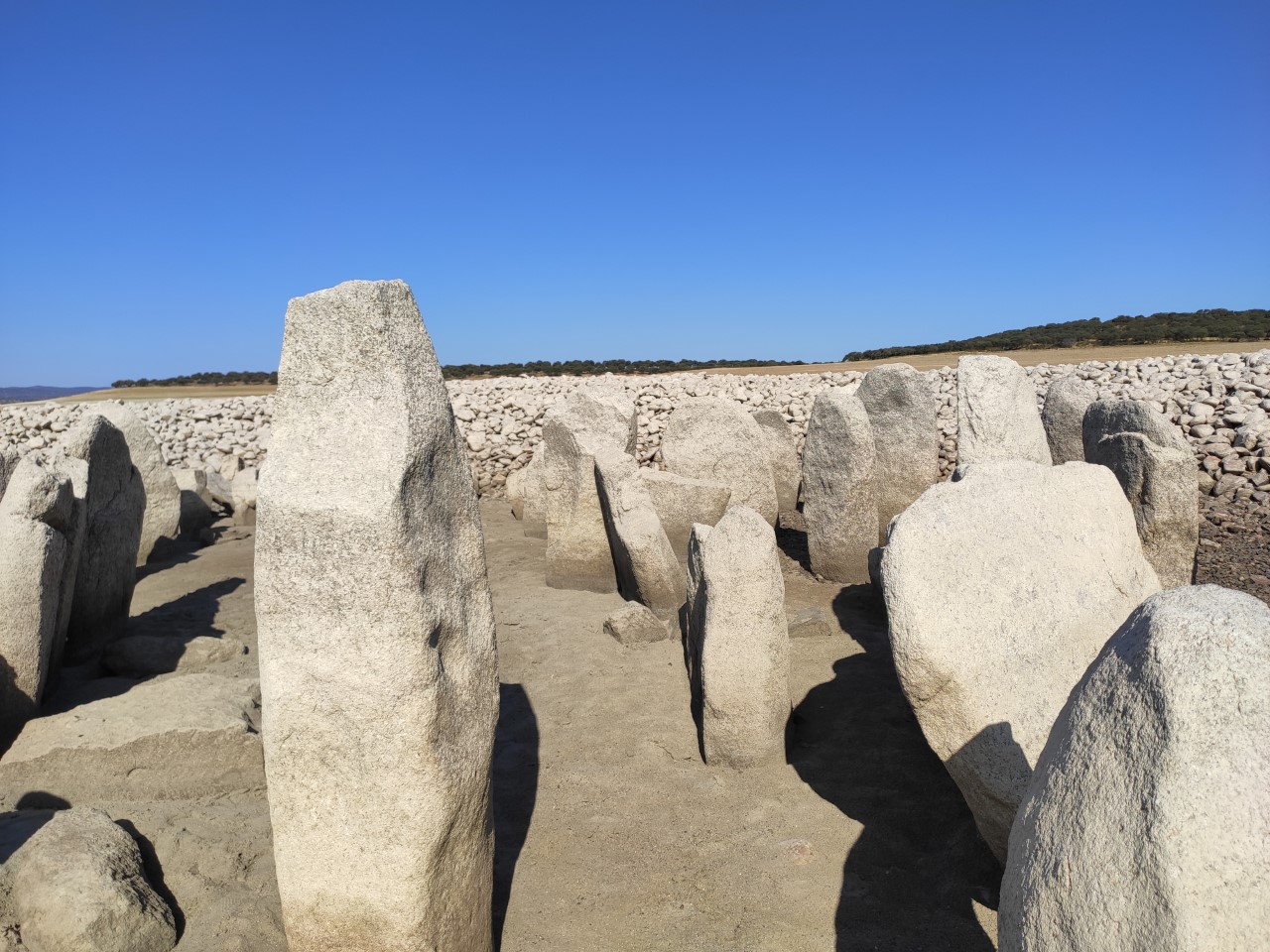
Sculpted menhir believed to represent the line of the River Tagus
