= Cave of Salemas =

Cave and archaeological site in Portugal

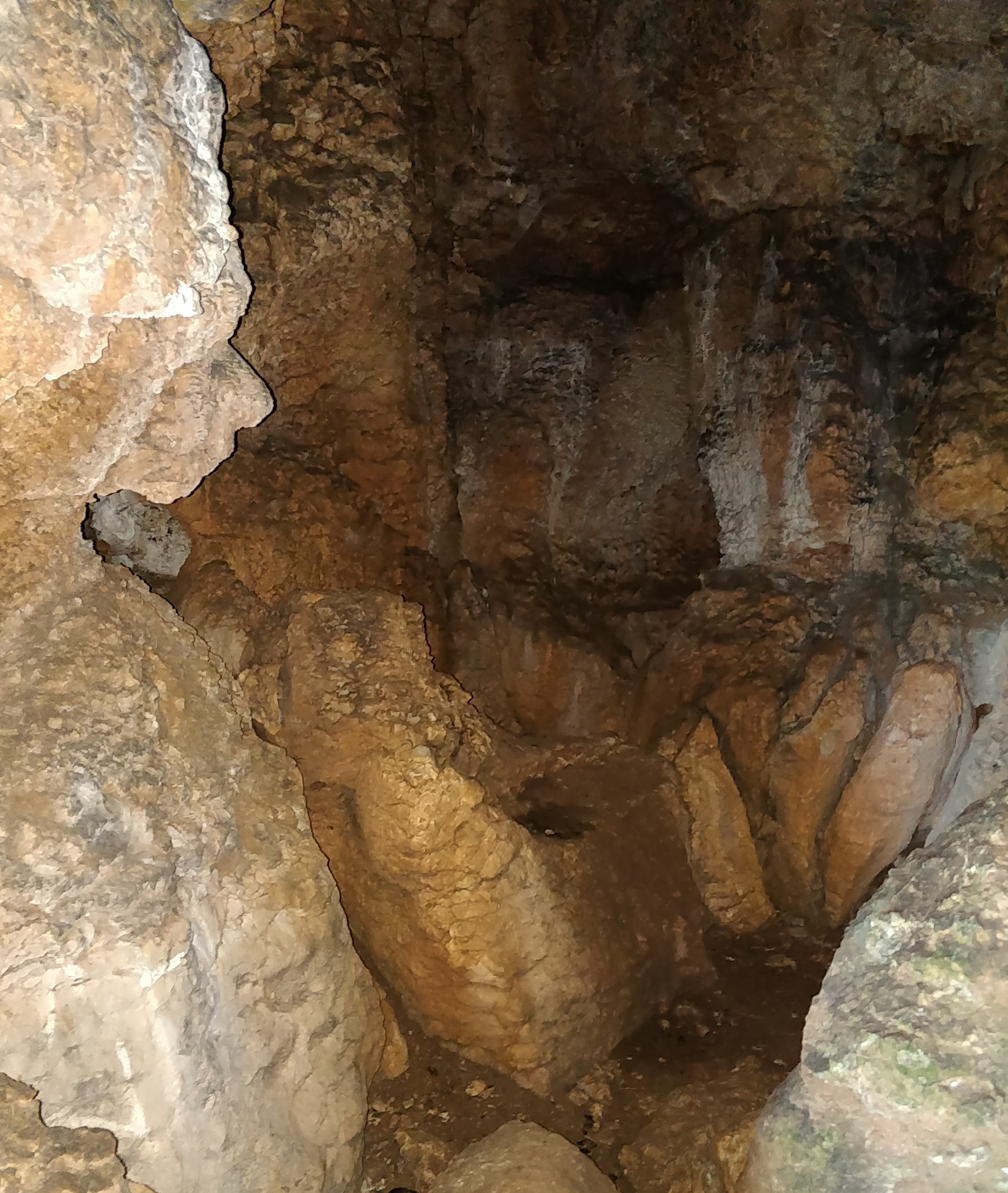
- Interactive map of Cave of Salemas
- Location: Loures, Lisbon District, Portugal
- Coordinates: 38°52′33″N 9°12′12″W
- Length: 30 m (98 ft)
- Elevation: 250 metres
- Discovery: 1959
- Geology: Cretaceous limestone
- Entrances: 1
- Difficulty: easy
- Access: No restriction

The Cave of Salemas is located close to the village of Lousa in the municipality of Loures in the Lisbon District of Portugal. Discovered by archaeologists during the 1950s, the cave appears to have been occupied by humans as a temporary refuge during the Upper Paleolithic and used as a tomb during the Neolithic.

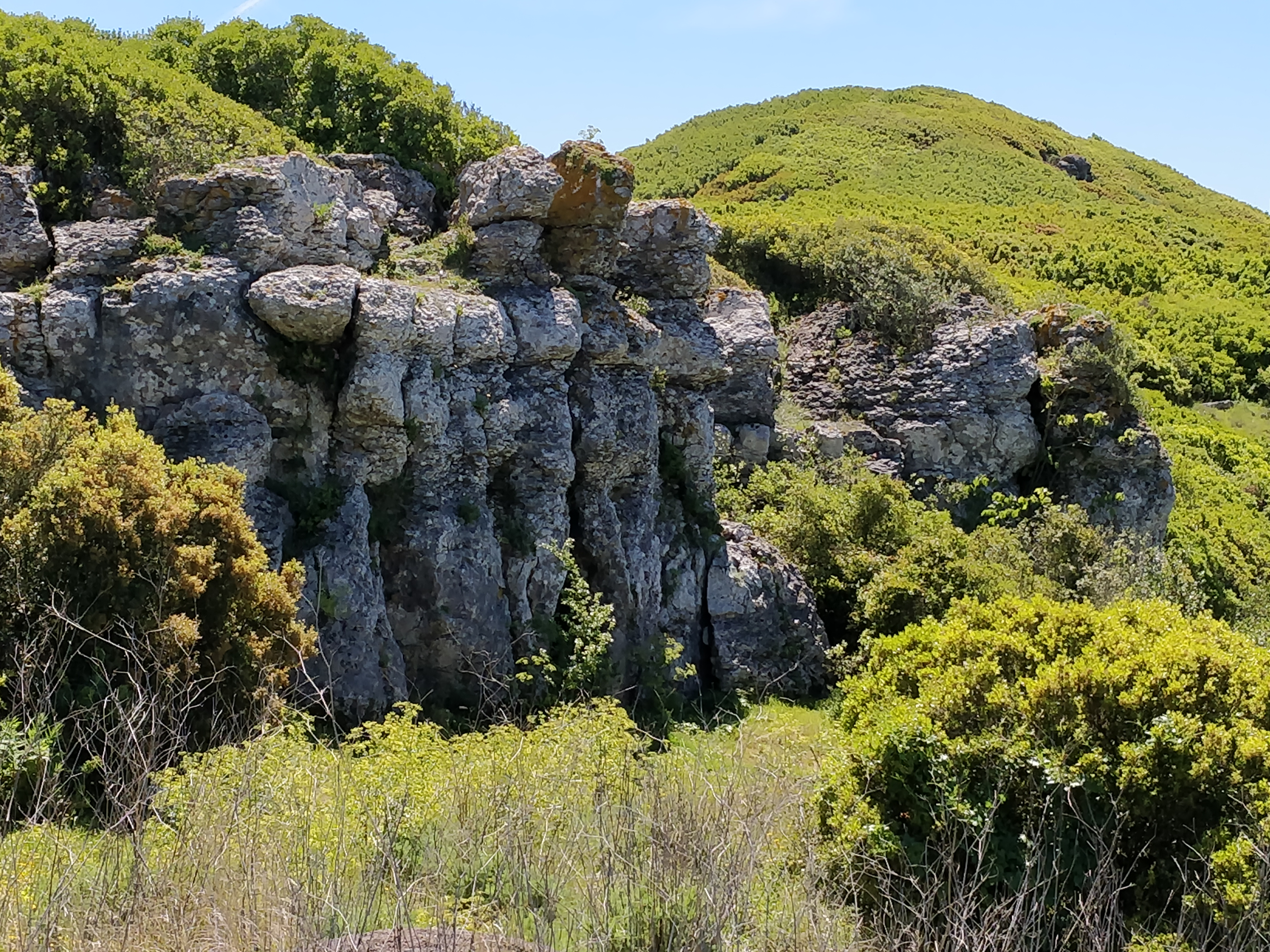
Limestone outcrop where the Cave of Salemas is found

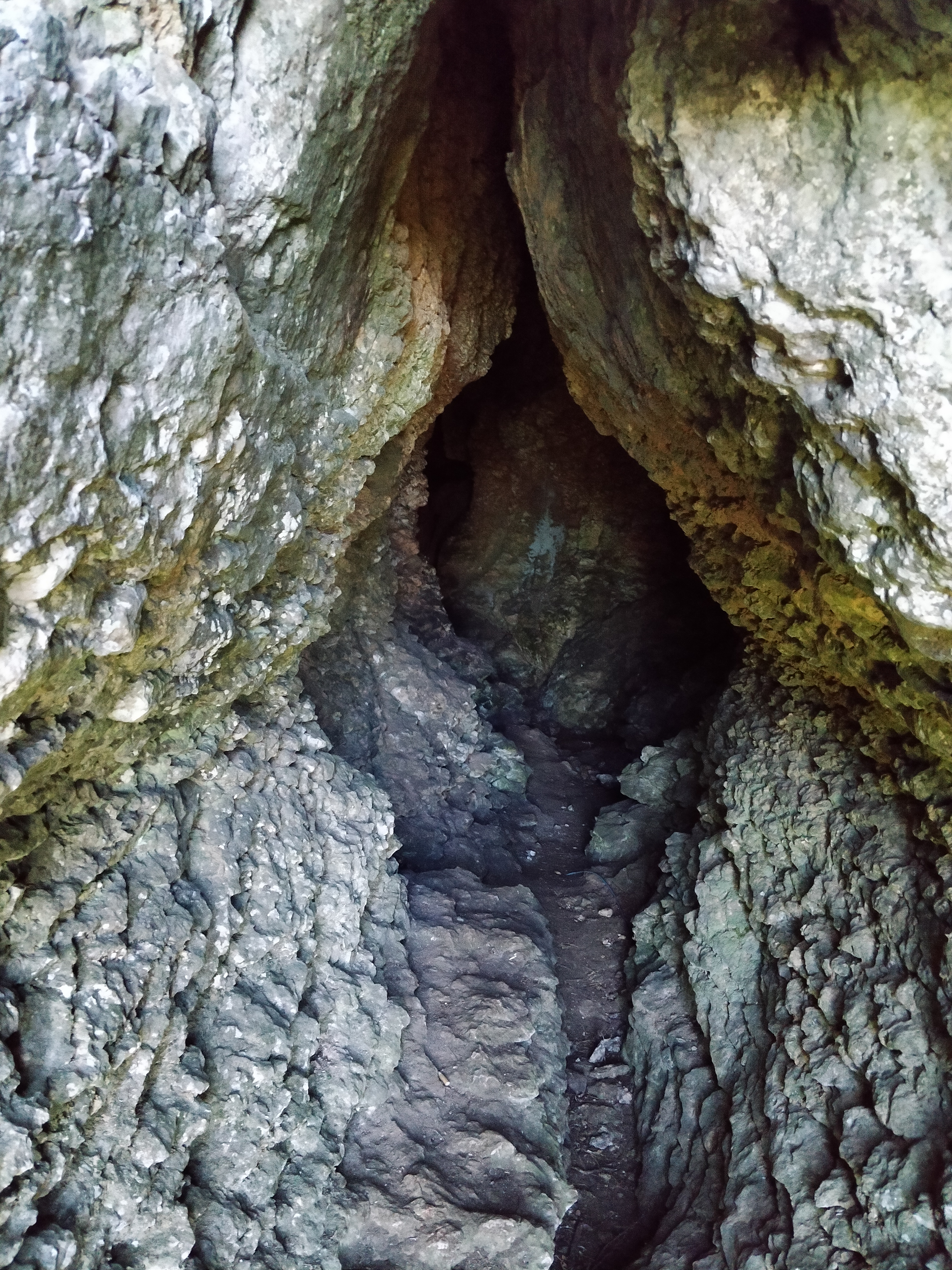
The Cave of Salemas from the entrance

Located in a Cretaceous limestone outcrop, the cave is situated about 100 metres north of the Neolithic dolmen known as the Anta do Alto da Toupeira. It is a solutional cave and consists of a winding rift passage about 30 metres long and one metre wide. Although not unique in the area, it is the most developed cave, both in terms of size and depth. It was first explored in September 1959 by L. Albuquerque e Castro and then fully excavated by a team from the Geological Survey of Portugal, headed by O. de Veiga Ferreira, José Camarate Andrade França and Georges Zbyszewski, during two digs in November 1959 and in October- December 1960.

The top levels excavated contained Neolithic materials, such as ceramic items, together with human bones consistent with the existence of a necropolis and the bones of small animals. The relatively few tools found suggest that the cave never served as a permanent dwelling for humans. Lower levels contained evidence of Solutrean lithic and bone tools and artefacts of the Upper Paleolithic, together with bones of various fauna. There is evidence that some of the Paleolithic levels were removed in part of the cave during the Neolithic to make way for the necropolis. Animal bones discovered included those of brown bears (Ursus arctos) and cave bears (Ursus spelaeus); leopards (Felis pardus) and Iberian lynx (Felis pardina); hyenas; wolves; and horses.

Items collected are stored in Lisbon’s Geological Museum (Museu Geológico). Carbon dating puts the dates of human bones and a tooth from the Paleolithic as being from around 25,000 to 20,000 years ago.
