= Valdecañas reservoir =

Reservoir on the Tagus River, Province of Cáceres, Spain

Valdecañas reservoir (Embalse de Valdecañas)
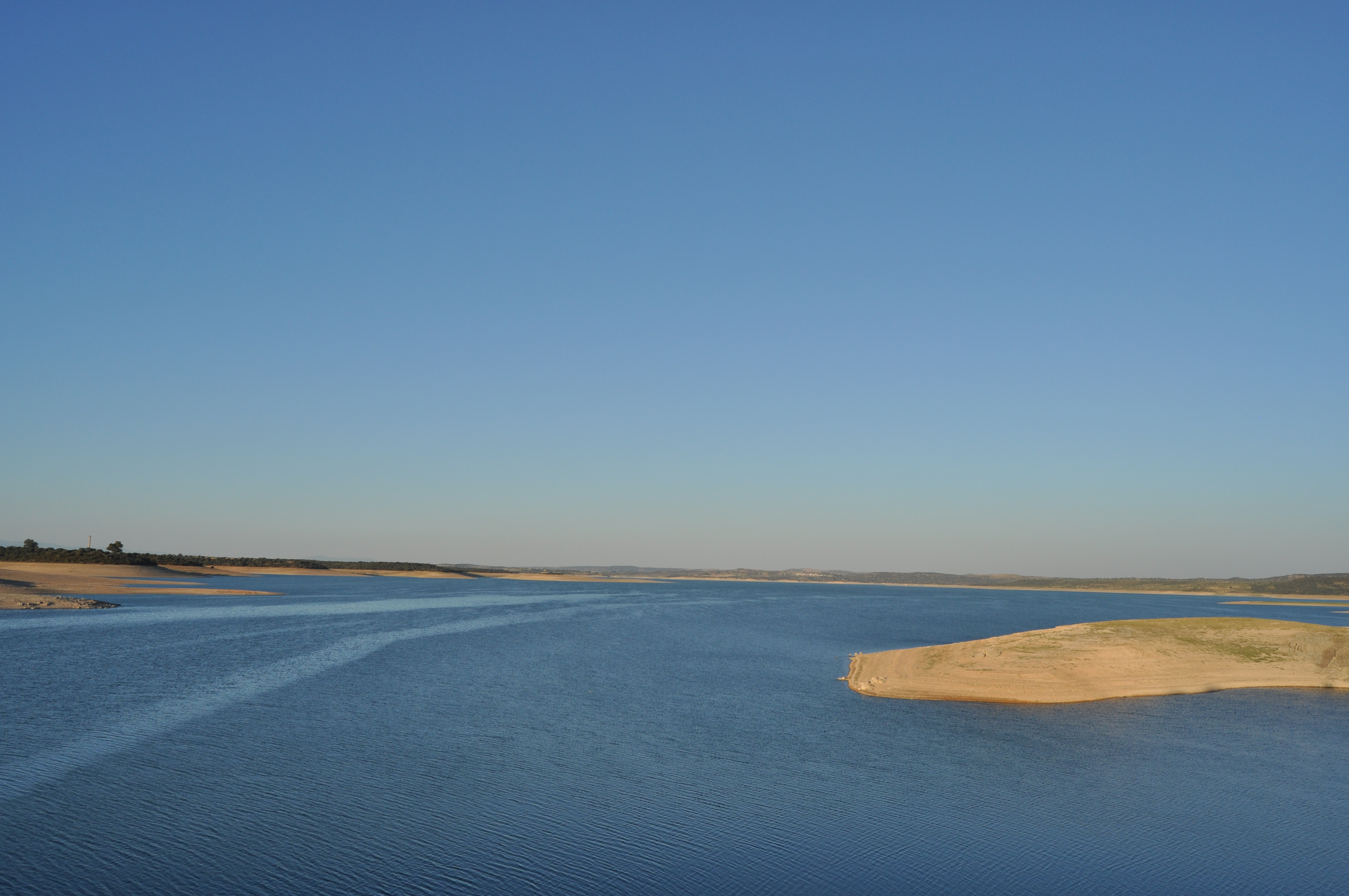
- Valdecañas reservoir (Embalse de Valdecañas)

- Location within Extremadura
- Country: Spain
- Coordinates: 39°46′41″N 5°36′47″W
- Owner: Estado español

Upper dam and spillways
- Height: 98

Upper reservoir
- Total capacity: 1.446 hm³

Lower dam and spillways
- Impounds: Tajo

Power Station
- Type: Bóveda

The Valdecañas reservoir (embalse de Valdecañas, in Spanish) is a reservoir on the Tagus River. It begins in the municipality of El Gordo and ends at the Valdecañas dam, in Belvís de Monroy, in the Province of Cáceres, Spain. Its basin has an area of 36,540 km2 with an average annual water inflow of 4,054 hm³.

In 2025, the 225 MW pumped-storage hydroelectricity power station opened, combined with a 15 MW / 7.5 MWh battery. The reservoir has a storage capacity of 210 GWh.

== History ==
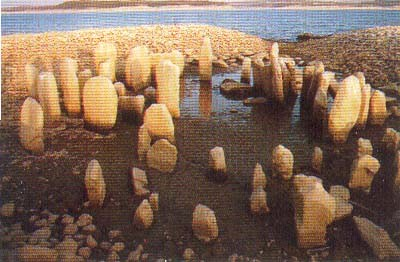
Dolmen of Guadalperal.

The reservoir project's construction was started 1957 and completed in 1964.

Beneath its waters is a Bronze Age site with a dolmen that emerges when the waters drop. The Guadalperal dolmen megalithic complex is also called the Spanish Stonehenge for its resemblance to Stonehenge, a megalithic monument located near Amesbury, England.

== Land Use ==
In 2014, the demolition of a tourist complex known as Isla de Valdecañas was ordered by El Tribunal Supremo, the Supreme Court of Spain. This complex was built within the reservoir, in the area belonging to Natura 2000.
