= Praia das Maçãs Prehistoric Monument =

Neolithic site near Sintra, Portugal

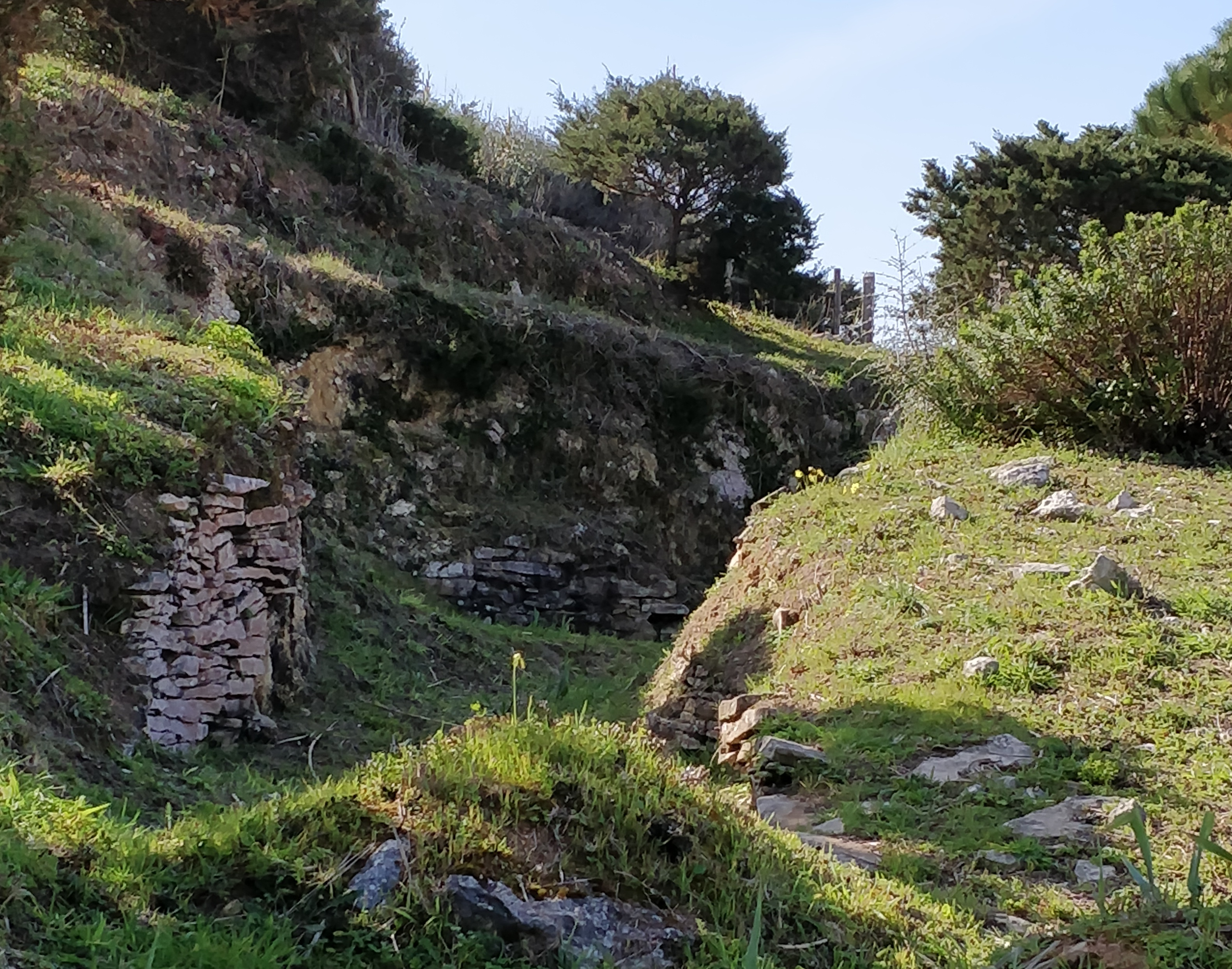

- Location within Portugal
- Interactive map of Praia das Maçãs Prehistoric Monument
- 38°49′35″N 9°27′59″W
- Type: Tholos or Beehive tomb
- Periods: Neolithic, Chalcolithic
- Location: Colares (Sintra), Lisbon District, Portugal

Site notes
- Material: earth, stone
- Elevation: 34 m (112 ft)
- Excavation dates: 1969, 1981
- Archaeologists: Vera Leisner, Georges Zbyszewski and Octávio da Veiga Ferreira (1969)
- Discovered: 1927
- Public access: No. Visible through fence.

The Praia das Maçãs Prehistoric Monument, also known as the Tholos of Outeiro das Mós, consists of an artificial Neolithic cave and a Chalcolithic domed or beehive tomb.

== Location ==
It is situated close to the Praia das Maçãs beach, near the town of Colares in Sintra municipality, in the Lisbon District of Portugal.

== History ==
The area was discovered in 1927. As an important prehistoric sepulchral site, it was classified as a national monument in 1974. Surrounded by housing, the location has been designated as a special zone of protection, and construction is forbidden. Plans by Sintra and the Directorate-General for Cultural Heritage to turn the complex into a museum area, first discussed in 2001, have not yet been implemented. For purposes of protection the site has been covered by sand and there is little presently visible.

The artificial cave was probably dug into the rock in the second half of the 4th millennium BC or early in the 3rd. The tholos was added later. The site is seen as a good example of the practice of re-appropriation of symbolic locations, resulting in funeral practices of two different eras coexisting in the same space. After discovery of the site by an agricultural worker in 1927 there were limited excavations by the National Museum of Archaeology and Ethnology but little work on the necropolis was really carried out until archaeologists Vera Leisner, Georges Zbyszewski and Octávio da Veiga Ferreira excavated it, starting in 1969, after having seen items discovered unofficially by a private collector in the 1930s. Further work by Sintra Council was carried out in 1981.

== Size ==
The Neolithic cave has a diameter of around 2 m (6 ft 7 in) and was originally covered with stone supports. The later tholos was composed of a circular chamber with a diameter of approximately 5.5 m (18 ft). Walls were constructed with limestone slabs placed horizontally. A pillar was raised in the centre to support a dome. An access corridor, about 3.5 m (11 ft) long, connected the chamber to a 2-metre-wide atrium. Items found at the site have included geometric microliths, arrowheads, polished axes, and cylindrical idols. These have been preserved at the National Museum of Archaeology and Ethnology in Lisbon, and the Regional Museum of Sintra.

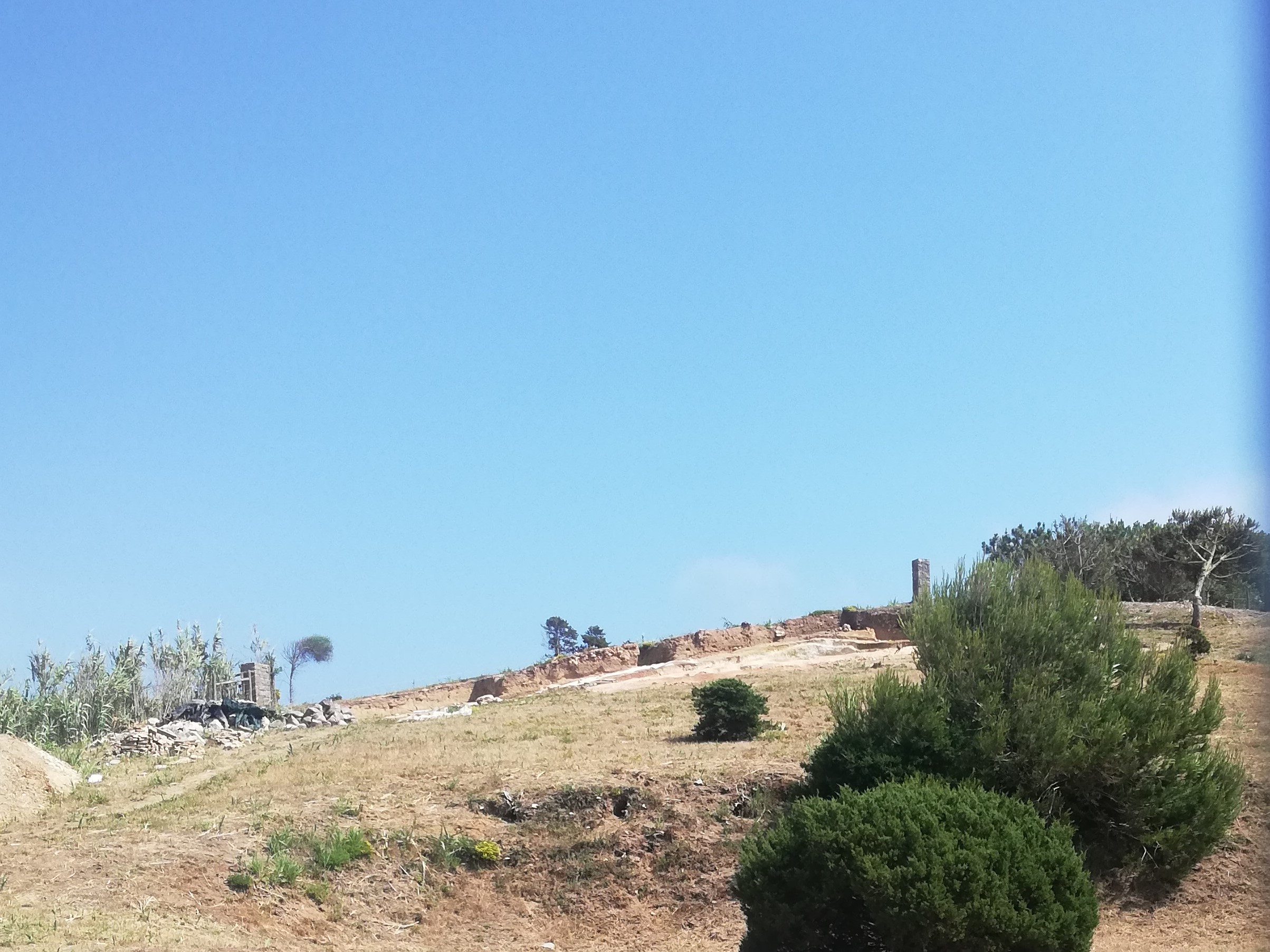
View of the monument

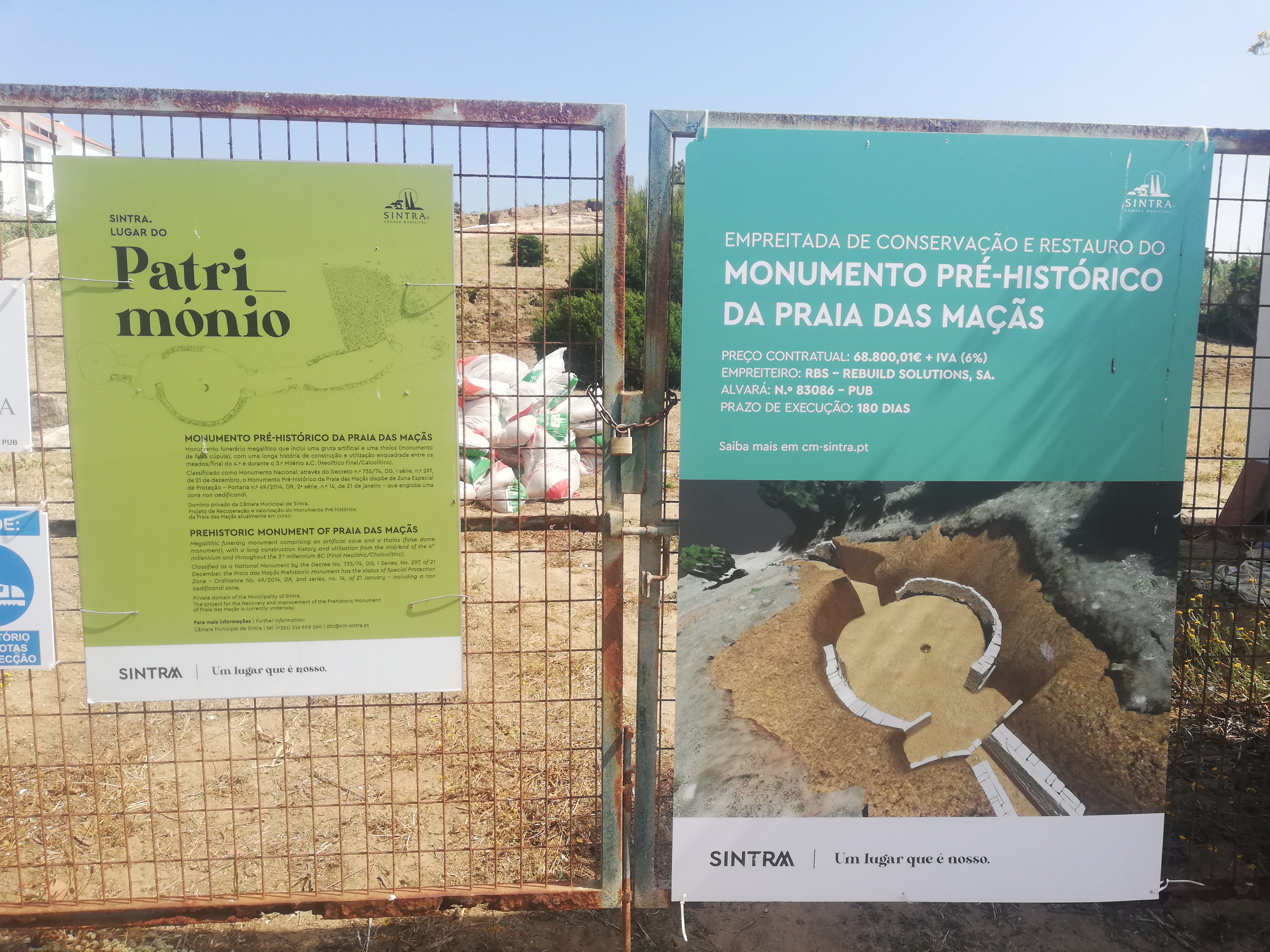
Sign outside the monument
