= Anta da Estria =

Megalithic site near Queluz, Portugal

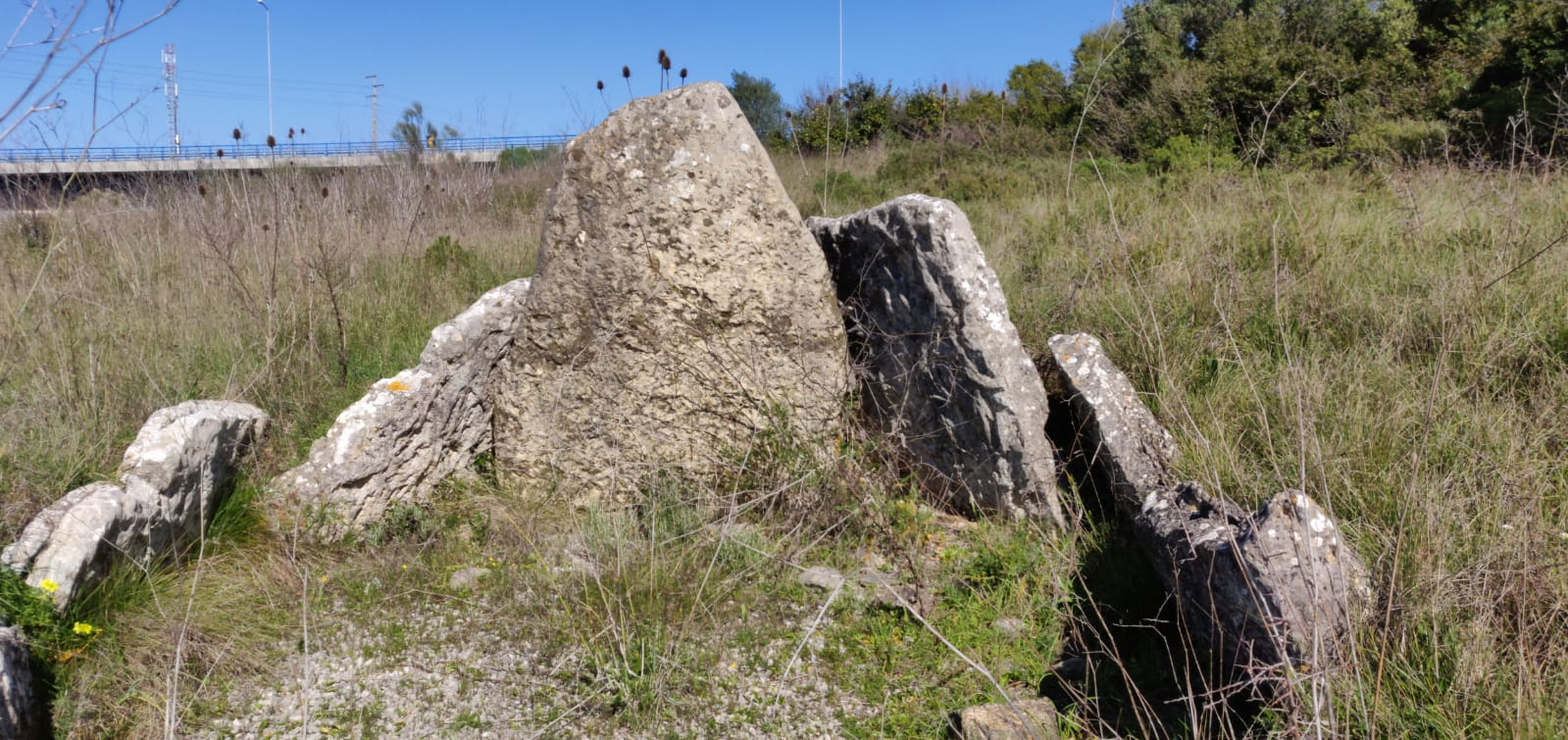
- The dolmen in 2019
- Interactive map of Anta da Estria
- 38°46′11″N 9°16′03″W
- Type: Dolmen
- Periods: Late Neolithic; Chalcolithic
- Location: Belas, Lisbon, Portugal

History
- Built: c. 3250 BC

Site notes
- Height: 2.75 m (9 ft 0 in)
- Excavation dates: January–February 1875
- Archaeologists: Carlos Ribeiro (1875); Ana Carvalho Dias
- Discovered: 1875 by Carlos Ribeiro
- Condition: Poor
- Owner: Public
- Public access: With difficulty

The Anta da Estria is a megalithic dolmen situated between Belas and Queluz in the Lisbon District of Portugal. Based on datings of human remains, it is believed to date back to the Late Neolithic and early-Chalcolithic eras (4000-2500 BC). The Anta da Estria, the Anta do Monte Abraão and the Anta da Pedra dos Mouros (also known as the Anta do Senhor da Serra) are collectively known as the Antas de Belas, and were first identified in the 1870s by Carlos Ribeiro, who is regarded as the "father" of Portuguese prehistoric archaeology.

The dolmen is presently in a much-degraded condition and difficult to access. It was almost destroyed by construction in the 1990s of Portugal’s A9 motorway but was eventually incorporated into the landscaped area of a service station for that highway, facilitating easy access. However, the service area has since been closed and access by cars has been blocked. Pedestrian access remains possible, using a footbridge over a motorway slip road.

Carlos Ribeiro, who carried out research in early 1875 and published his results in 1880, described the tomb as having a polygonal chamber, 2–5 metres wide and 2.75 metres high, approached by a corridor bordered by small slabs of limestone. Later excavations carried out by what is now the Portuguese Institute of Architectural and Archaeological Heritage (IPPAR), of the Direção-Geral do Património Cultural (Directorate-General for Cultural Heritage), under the direction of Ana Carvalho Dias have shown the corridor to make use of a pre-existing inclined depression in the rock. This dictated the orientation of the tomb, which points to 212-13 degrees west. Ribeiro identified nine raised slabs but did not identify any stones that could have formed a roof. He considered all of the slabs to have been locally sourced, and this has been confirmed by subsequent research. The hard limestone is similar to that used for the other Antas de Belas.

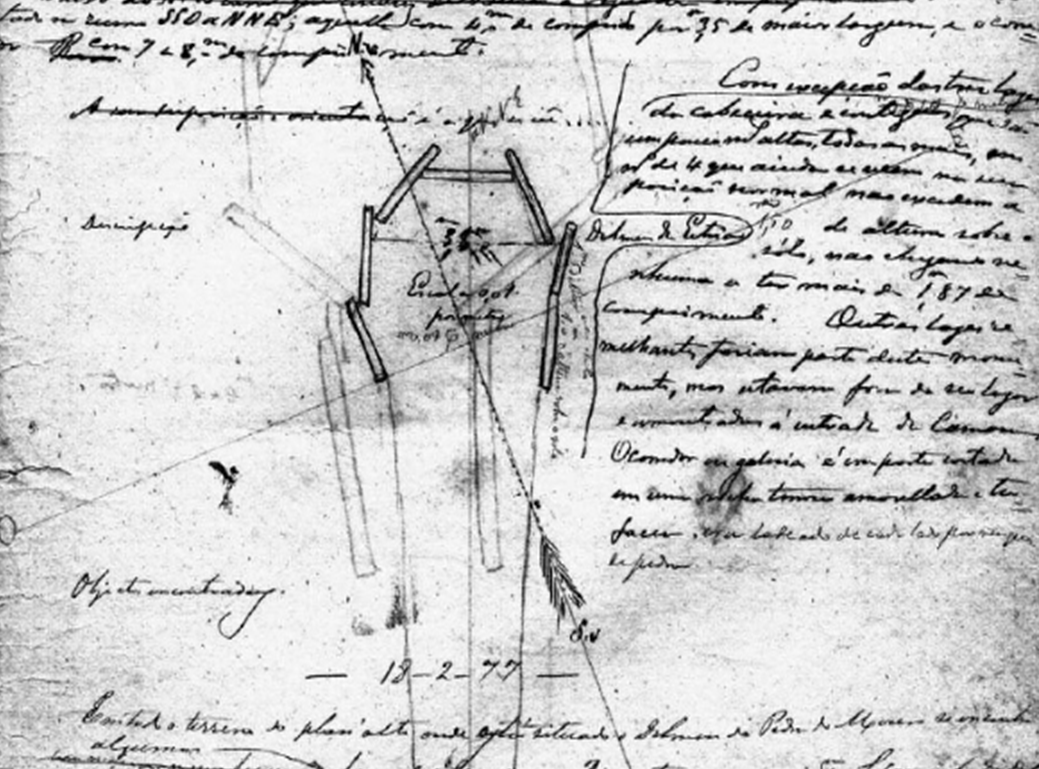
Drawing by Carlos Ribeiro of the Anta da Estria

Limited artifacts have been discovered at the site but many are thought to have been removed prior to the discovery by Ribeiro. Twelve arrowheads were identified, together with two bone artifacts and three small, almost-complete pots. While human remains were found, Ribeiro did not feel confident to identify the number of burials that had taken place at the tomb, which he had done for the Anta do Monte Abraão.
