= Anta da Pedra dos Mouros =

Megalithic site near Belas, Portugal

- Anta do Senhor da Serra
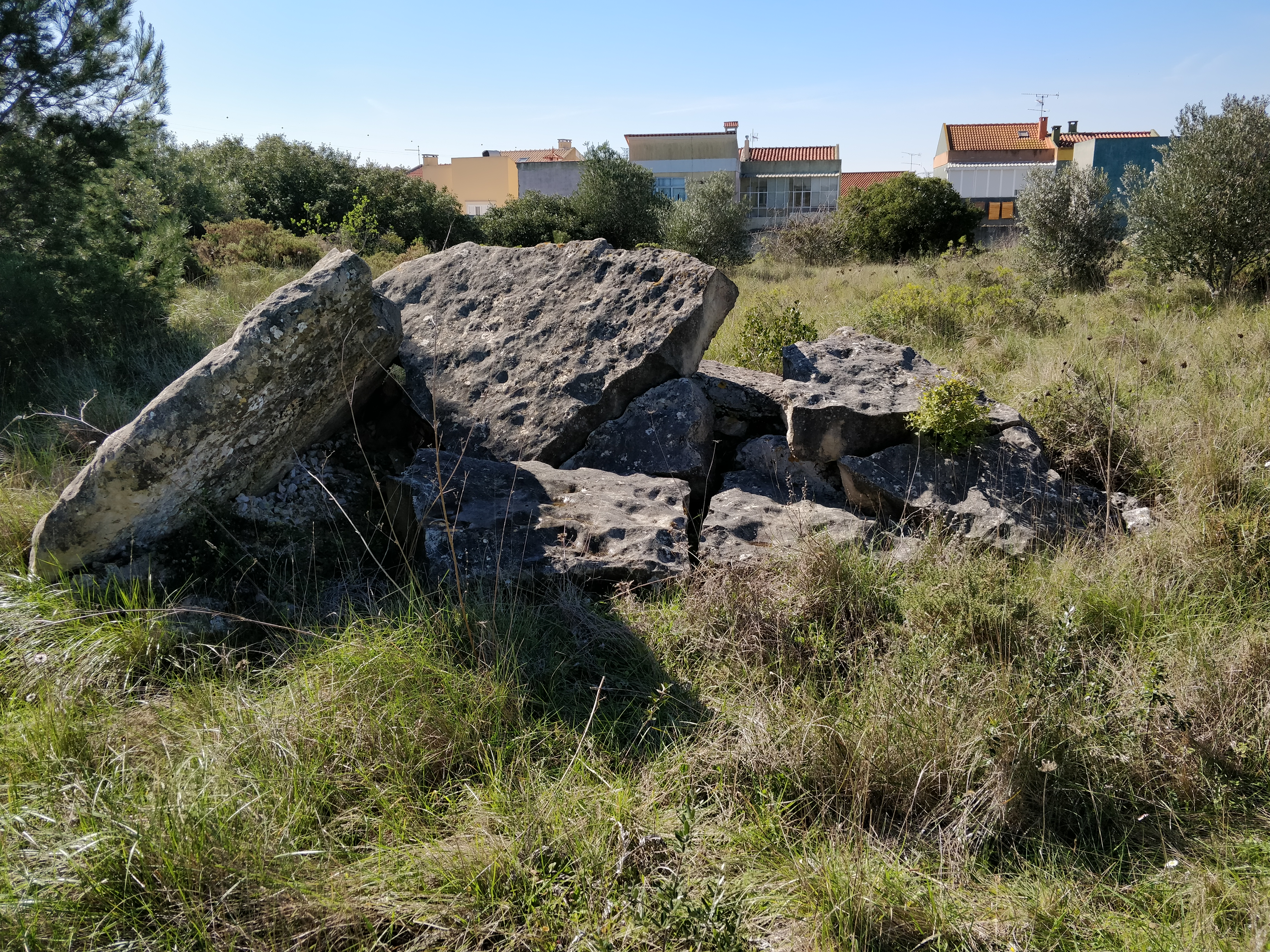
- The dolmen in 2019
- Interactive map of Anta da Pedra dos Mouros
- 38°46′23″N 9°16′00″W
- Type: Dolmen
- Periods: Late Neolithic; Chalcolithic
- Location: Belas, Lisbon, Portugal

History
- Built: c. 3250 BC

Site notes
- Excavation dates: 1876
- Archaeologists: Carlos Ribeiro (1876); O. V. Ferreira (1963)
- Discovered: 1856 by Carlos Ribeiro
- Public access: With difficulty

The Anta da Pedra dos Mouros (Stone of the Moors), also known as the Anta do Senhor da Serra (Lord of the Mountains), is a megalithic dolmen situated near Belas and Queluz in the Lisbon District of Portugal. It is believed to date back to the late-Neolithic and early-Chalcolithic eras (4000-2500 BC). The Anta da Pedra dos Mouros, the Anta da Estria, and the Anta do Monte Abraão are a short distance from each other and are collectively known as the Antas de Belas. The Anta da Pedra dos Mouros was first identified in 1856 by Carlos Ribeiro. Despite being registered and protected as a national monument in 1910, the dolmen has recently suffered significant damage.

The Anta da Pedra dos Mouros was reportedly first identified in 1856 by Carlos Ribeiro but he did not have a chance to carry out excavations until 1876 after receiving approval from the landowner, the Marquis of Belas. The burial chamber was at that time already in bad condition, having only three upright support stones, with one apparently having two anthropomorphic figures engraved on it. Ribeiro found three remaining orthostats in situ. The largest one was sloping to the north, 5 meters long, 3.7 meters wide and 27 centimeters thick. This was partially supported by a second piece, 4.5 meters long, 2 meters wide and 25 centimeters thick, which was in contact with the third stone, which was about 4 meters wide, but rose only one meter above the ground, since it was broken. There were no visible fragments around. During the excavation, Ribeiro also found four smaller slabs. Ribeiro and subsequent studies (by Ferreira, G. and V. Leisner and Boaventura) have produced differing interpretations of both the exact structure of the sepulchre and its orientation.

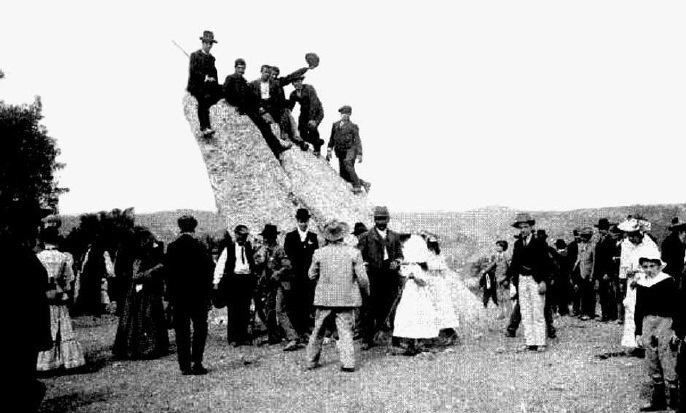
Anta da Pedra dos Mouros c. 1905

Items found by Ribeiro during his excavations are kept in the Geological Museum in Lisbon. They include a stone axe, flint tools, utensils for domestic use, vases, and human and animal bones. Ribeiro noted that the contents of the tomb had already been disturbed, and that his findings were "not very fruitful". This impression was confirmed by the presence in the spoils of a Portuguese coin dated 1741 and by information from local inhabitants who advised Ribeiro that the tomb had been raided a decade before his excavations. However, contrary to the opinion of Ribeiro (1880) and later authors, the items collected, although scarce, do allow for an overall understanding of the tomb.

The site had for a long time been one of pilgrimage for the local population, it being believed that newly married women who slid down the side of the dominant stone would then be able to conceive. These pilgrimages came to an end in 1942 when the landowner forbade access. The dominant stone was found shattered into numerous pieces in June 2010: it remains unclear whether this was caused by vandalism or was the result of detonations during construction of the new A9 Motorway, which passes close to the dolmen.
