= Carlos Ribeiro =

Portuguese geologist and archaeologist

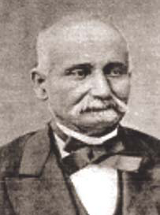
- Died: Lisbon
- Education: University of Porto
- Known for: Geological Map of Portugal; Mesolithic archaeology
- Spouse: Ursula Damasio
- Children: 3
- Scientific career
- Institutions: General Directorate of Geodetic Works, Lisbon

Carlos Ribeiro (21 December 1813, in Lisbon – 13 November 1882, in Lisbon) was a pioneering geologist and archaeologist who inaugurated the concept of fieldwork in Portugal, and was responsible for the discovery and excavation of many Neolithic and other sites in Portugal. Director of the first Geological Commission of Portugal (1857), he led production of the first edition of the Geological Chart of Portugal to the scale of 1/500,000, work which was awarded a silver medal at the Universal Exhibition of Paris (1878). He also served as an officer of the Portuguese army and as a Member of Parliament.

== Biography ==
From relatively humble beginnings Carlos Ribeiro began work at an early age after only a basic education, continuing to study while working. During this time he met Filipe Folque (1800-1874), an aristocratic military officer and mathematician who supported him with his studies, enabling him to obtain the necessary qualifications to enrol at the tertiary level. After fighting in the Portuguese Civil War (1828-34) in 1833–34, Ribeiro returned to studies by entering the Royal Academy of the Navy and, later, the Royal Academy of Fortification, Artillery and Drawing. His training earned him the rank of officer in 1837. In 1840 First-Lieutenant Ribeiro was transferred to Porto and there he entered the Polytechnic Academy to begin studies in geology. He carried out fieldwork in the area of Porto and began to develop his collections.

In 1845, he worked for the Lisbon Public Works Company, supervising works such as the construction of roads in the Lisbon area. He married Ursula Damasio, the sister of one of his teachers, in February 1846 and they had three children, José Victorino, Zélia and Sofia. In June of the same year he was dismissed from employment and removed from military service as a result of his support for the popular uprising known as the Maria da Fonte revolution, being imprisoned for a time during the Patuleia, or Little Civil War, until an amnesty was granted in June 1847 following the Convention of Gramido.

In 1849 he joined the staff of a private company that had coal-mining concessions near Buçaco and Cabo Mondego. His duties obliged him to cover a large part of the country, inspecting mines, quarries, etc., which allowed him to undertake fieldwork to gather rock and paleontological samples that would later be incorporated into the government's collection. He began to publish papers on his findings and also on topics such as cartography, general geology, prehistoric anthropology and archaeology. In 1850 in Buçaco Ribeiro met the English geologist Daniel Sharpe (1806–56), who had studied the geology of Portugal, and helped him with the translation and scientific revision of his publications. This brought Ribeiro to international attention and gave him the reputation of being the founder of Portuguese stratigraphy.

In 1852, with support from Fontes Pereira de Melo (1819-1887), a politician who had studied with him in the Royal Academy of Fortification, Ribeiro was appointed Head of the 4th section of the Technical Department of the General Directorate of Public Works, in charge of superintending mines, quarries and geological works. Together with F. A. Pereira da Costa (1809-1888), he developed the law on mines that was decreed on December 31, 1852. In 1859 he was appointed Head of the 2nd Division of the General Directorate of Public Works and Mines. He also doubled as Chief of the Geological Service. Within the framework of the Ministry of Public Works, the Geological Commission of Portugal was created in 1857 and Ribeiro was appointed Director-member of that Commission, a position shared jointly with Pereira da Costa. The purpose of the Geological Commission was to prepare the geological map of mainland Portugal, a difficult task given the limited human resources available. Due to disagreements within the commission, it was dissolved in February 1868, to be converted about one year later in one of the sections of the General Directorate of Geodetic Works under the supervision of Ribeiro.

In 1863, Ribeiro undertook research in the field of prehistory. He was responsible for finding the Muge Mesolithic Shell Middens (Concheiros de Muge) while studying the Tagus valley. His enthusiasm for the Mesolithic and Neolithic periods was one factor in taking the 9th International Congress of PreHistorical Anthropology and Archaeology to Lisbon in 1880, two years before his death. Among other sites identified and/or excavated by Ribeiro were megalithic tombs such as the Anta da Pedra dos Mouros, Anta das Pedras Grandes, Anta de Agualva, Anta da Estria, Anta do Alto da Toupeira, and the Anta do Monte Abraão.

In 1868, he published a groundbreaking work on the forests of Portugal. The geological map of Mainland Portugal was sent to the International Exhibition of Paris of 1878. It won a silver medal. Later the geological map was updated by Nery Delgado who worked with him, and by the Swiss geologist, Léon Paul Choffat, a scientist that Ribeiro had met at that exhibition. Carlos Ribeiro was elected deputy in the legislature of 1870-1874 and, later, in the legislature of 1880–1881. He died in Lisbon on 13 November 1882.
