= Anta das Pedras Grandes =

Megalithic site near Odivelas, Portugal

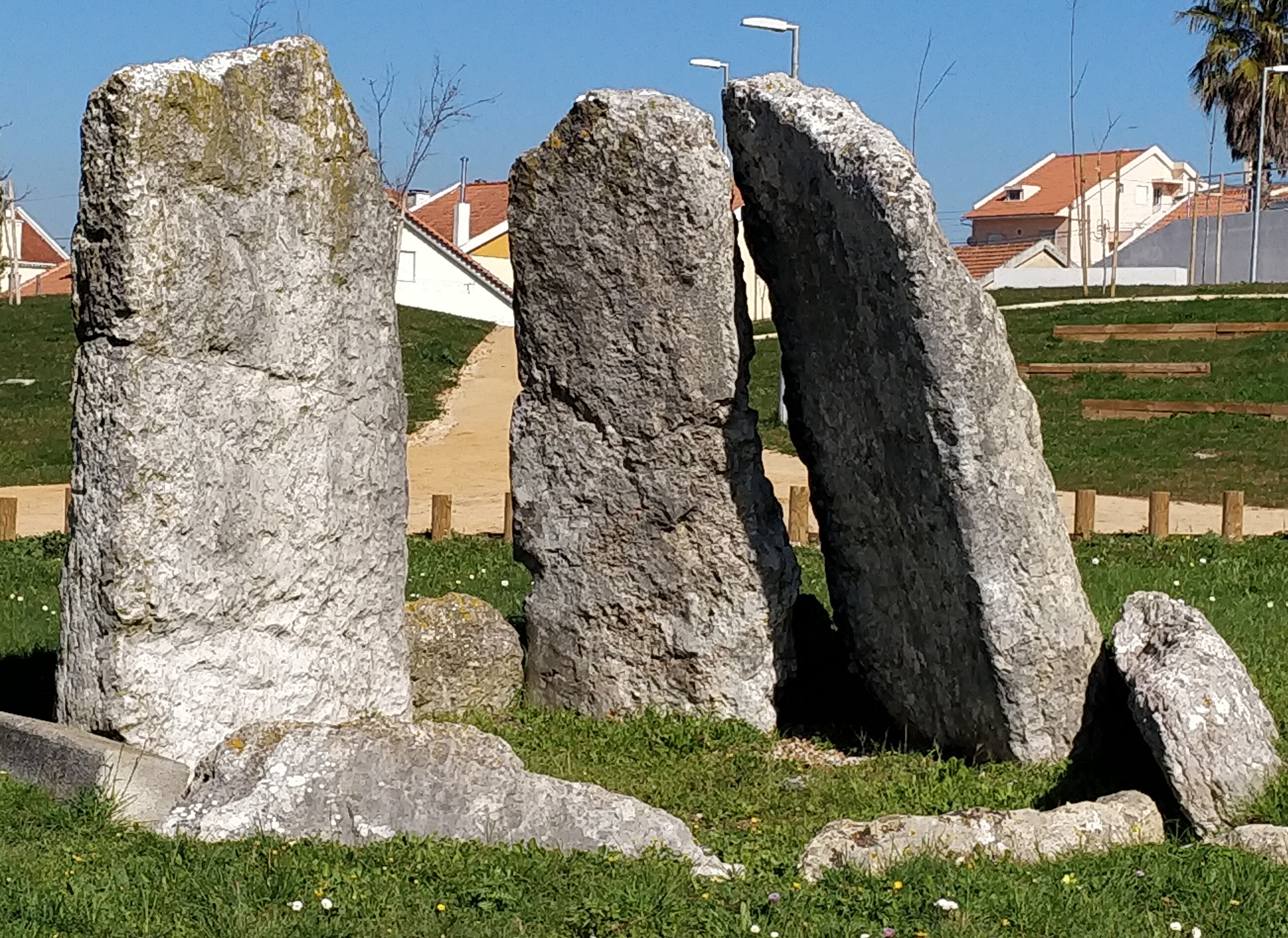
- The remaining stones from the dolmen in 2019
- Interactive map of Anta das Pedras Grandes
- 38°48′24″N 9°13′07″W
- Type: Dolmen
- Cultures: Late neolithic
- Location: Ramada e Canecas, Lisbon, Portugal

History
- Built: c. 3250 BC

Site notes
- Excavation dates: 2001-2004
- Discovered: 1880 by Carlos Ribeiro
- Owner: Public
- Public access: Yes

The Anta das Pedras Grandes (Dolmen of large stones) is a Late Neolithic (between 4500 and 2000 BC) site located in Ramada e Canecas, in the Odivelas municipality, in the Lisbon District of Portugal. Anta is the Portuguese name for about 5,000 megaliths built during the Neolithic period in the area of Portugal. It was classified as a National Monument in 1944. Excavations in the early 21st century suggest that it was originally built as a dolmen or single chamber megalithic tomb, consisting of a polygonal long chamber with eight supporting stones about 3 metres tall, and a short access corridor. There are traces of a tumulus, and human bones have been discovered. Excavations in the surrounding area also identified many flint chippings, suggesting that the area was used for the production of flint items.

The site was first identified in 1880 by the Portuguese archaeologist Carlos Ribeiro. It is the only surviving dolmen in the immediate area although several were discovered in the late 19th and early 20th centuries. Nevertheless it has suffered considerably from the use of stones by farmers and for construction.

The Anta das Pedras Grandes now forms the centrepiece of a small urban park, which was officially opened in late 2018. The remaining stones, which had all fallen, were lifted, to provide a clearer impression of the original architecture of the megalith.
