= Montemor-o-Novo =

- Municipality
- City of Montemor-o-Novo
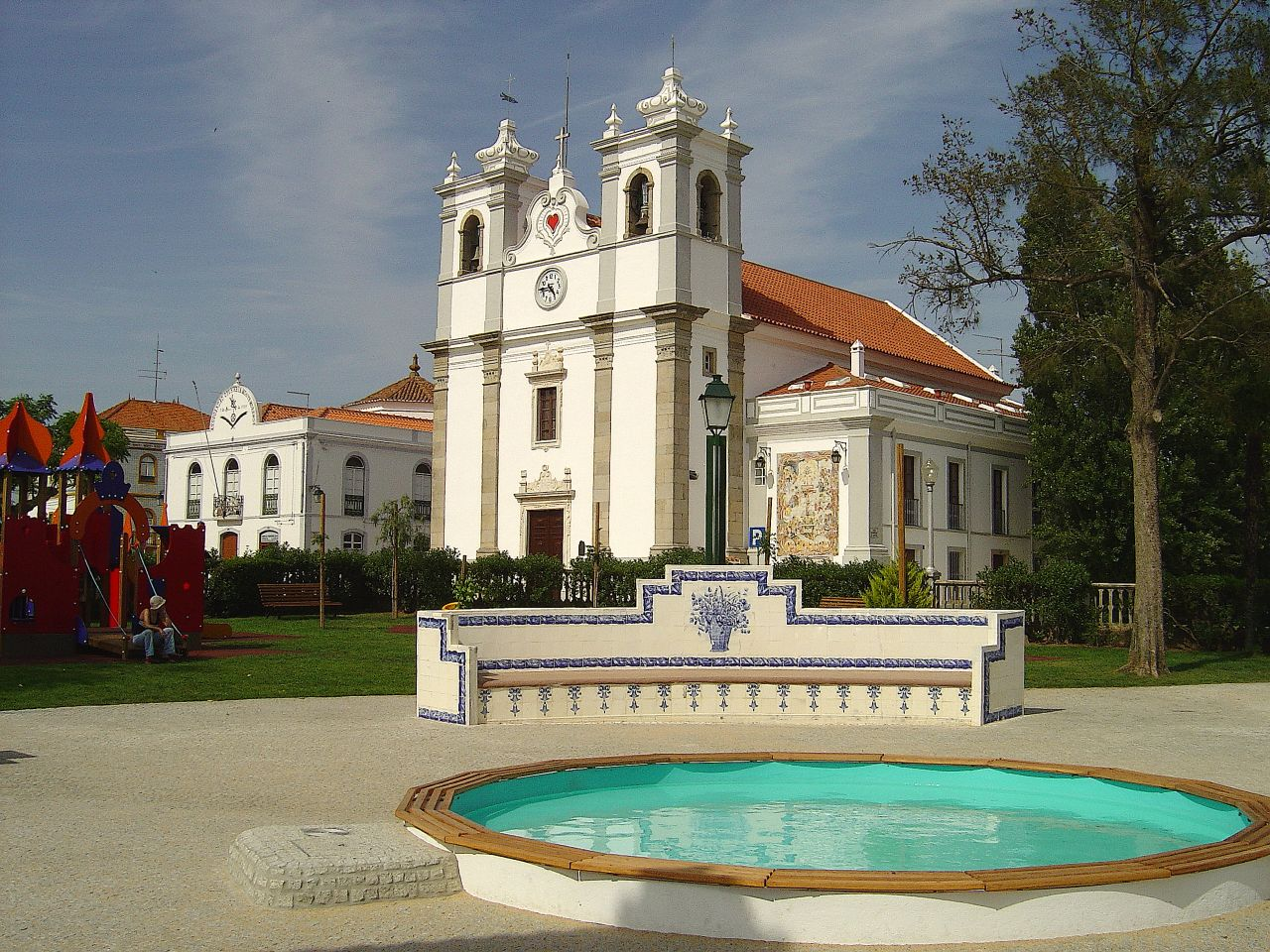

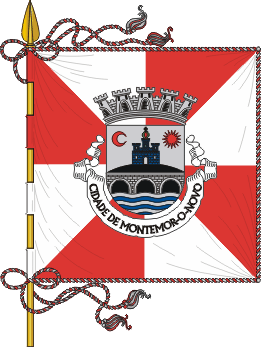
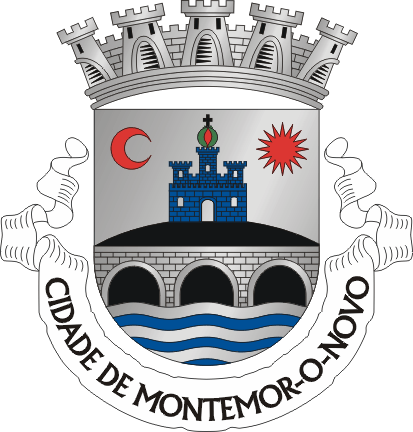
- Flag Coat of arms
- Interactive map of Montemor-o-novo
- Coordinates: 38°39′N 8°13′W
- Country: Portugal
- Region: Alentejo
- Intermunic. comm.: Alentejo Central
- District: Évora
- Parishes: 7

Government
  - President: Olímpio Manuel Vidigal Galvão (PS)

Area
  - Total: 1,232.97 km^{2} (476.05 sq mi)

Population (2011)
  - Total: 17,437
  - Density: 14.142/km^{2} (36.628/sq mi)
- Time zone: UTC+00:00 (WET)
  - Summer (DST): UTC+01:00 (WEST)
- Local holiday: Saint John of God; March 8
- Website: www.cm-montemornovo.pt

Montemor-o-Novo (Portuguese pronunciation: [mõtɨˈmɔɾ u ˈnovu]), officially the City of Montemor-o-Novo (Portuguese: Cidade de Montemor-o-Novo), is a city and municipality in the District of Évora in Portugal. The population in 2011 was 17,437, in an area of 1232.97 km^{2}. The city itself had a population of 8,928 in 2001.

The present mayor is Olímpio Manuel Vidigal Galvão, elected in 2021 by the Socialist Party. The municipal holiday is March 8, after Saint John of God, a 16th-century saint, who was born in Montemor-o-Novo.

== Parishes ==
Administratively, the municipality is divided into 7 civil parishes (freguesias):

- Cabrela
- Ciborro
- Cortiçadas de Lavre e Lavre
- Foros de Vale de Figueira
- Nossa Senhora da Vila, Nossa Senhora do Bispo e Silveiras
- Santiago do Escoural
- São Cristóvão

== Gallery ==
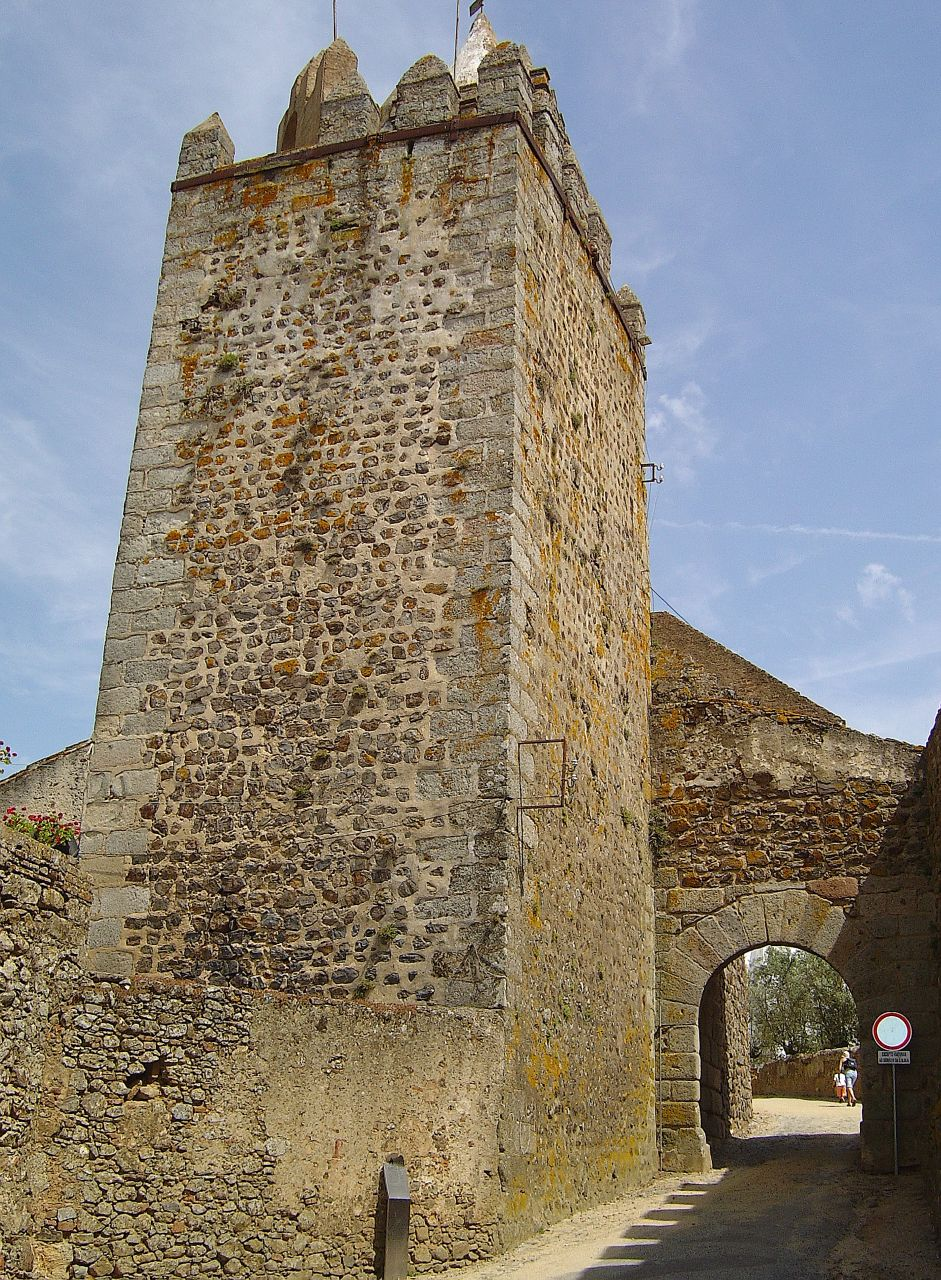
The city castle.

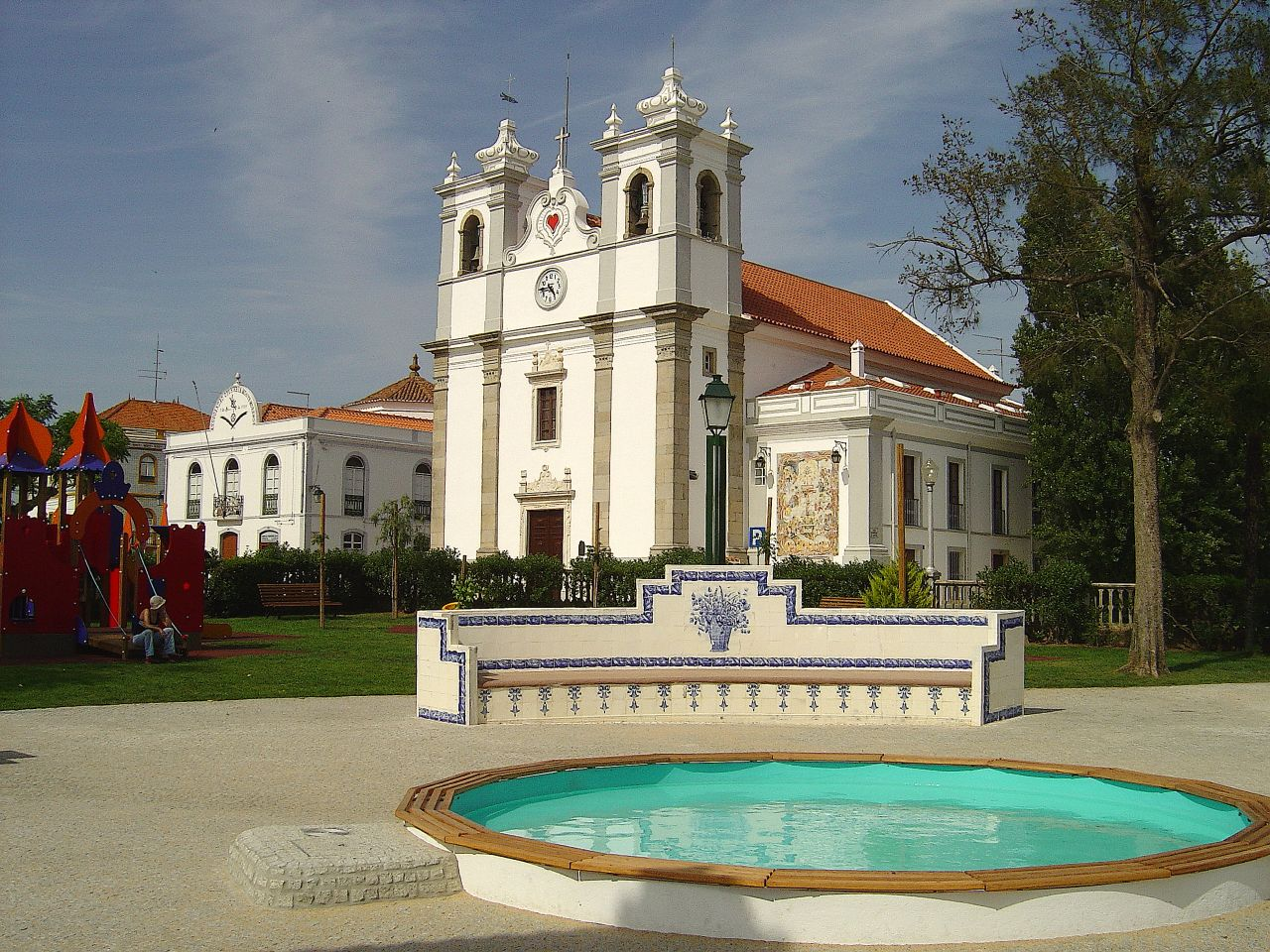
Town square.

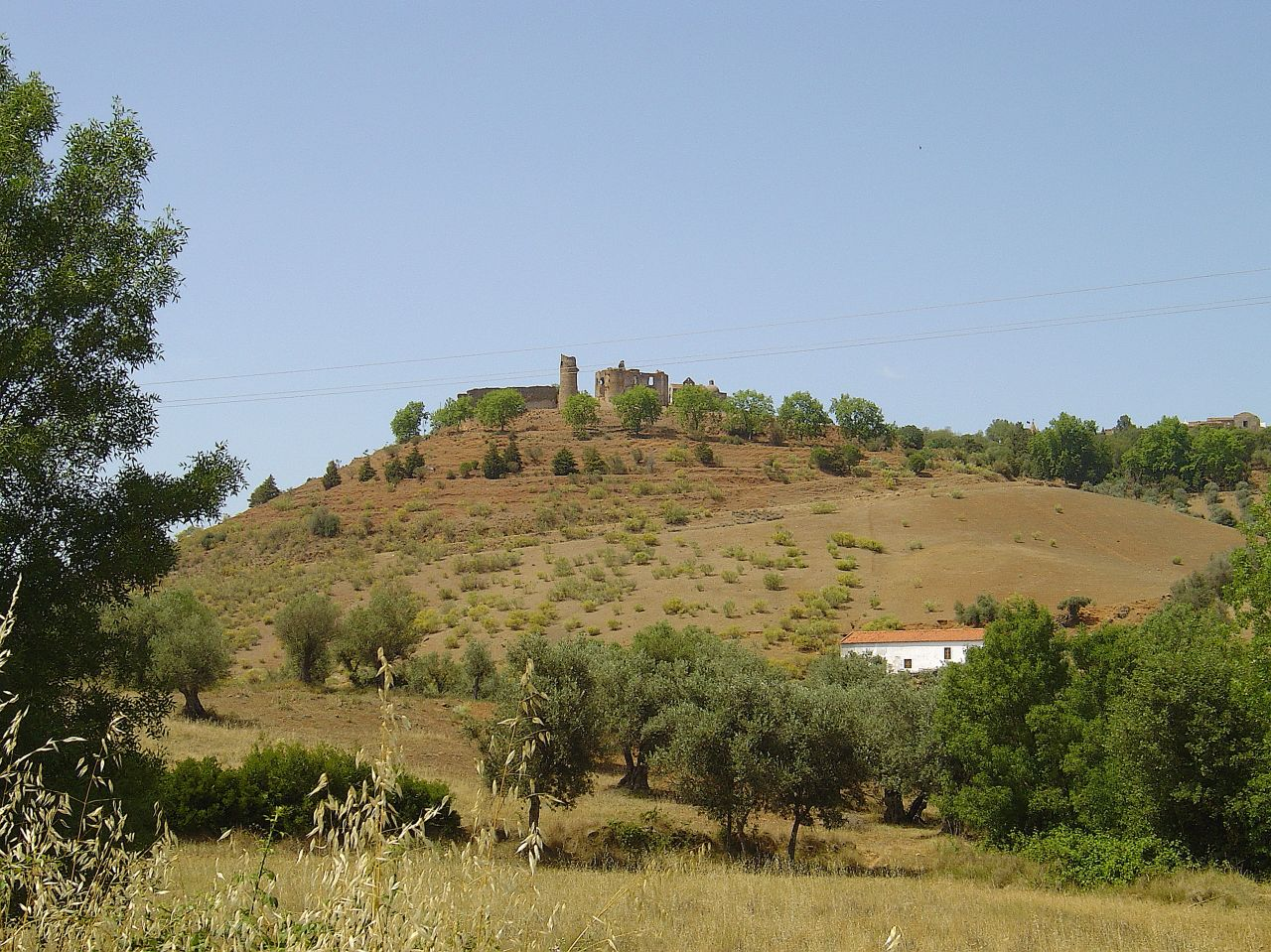
The local landscape.

== Notable people ==
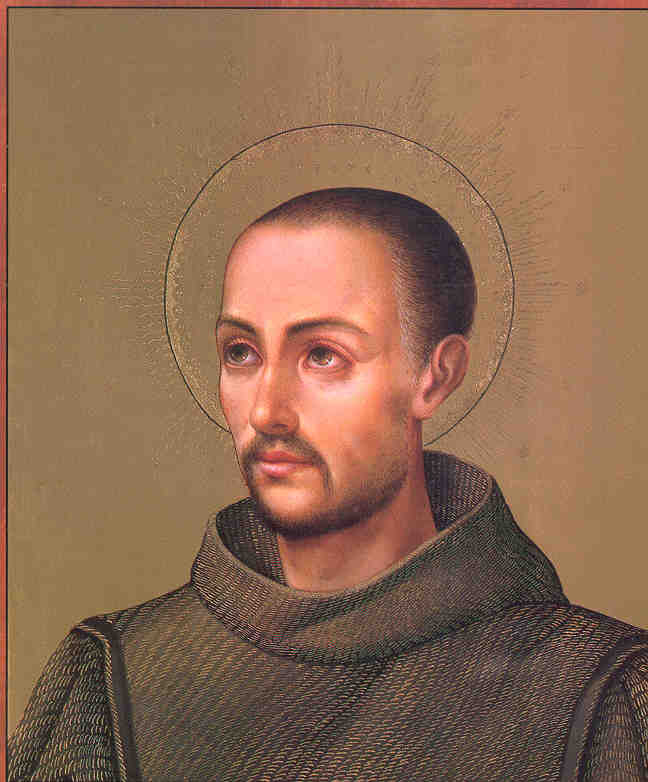
Saint John of God

- Vasco Gil Sodré (c.1450 — c.1500) a Portuguese navigator, early settler of the Azores island of Graciosa
- Saint John of God (1495–1550) a canonized Portuguese soldier turned health-care worker in Spain, whose followers later formed the Brothers Hospitallers of Saint John of God.
- Fernando Martins Mascarenhas (c.1548 – 1628) a scholar, theologian, and church leader
- Maria Clara Correia Alves (1869–1948) a Portuguese feminist, co-founder of the National Council of Portuguese Women
- Kalidás Barreto (1932–2020), trade unionist.
- Luís Capoulas Santos (born 1951) a Portuguese politician and Govt. Minister
- Ai Weiwei (born 1957), Chinese contemporary artist and activist
