= Anta do Monte Abraão =

Megalithic site near Odivelas, Portugal

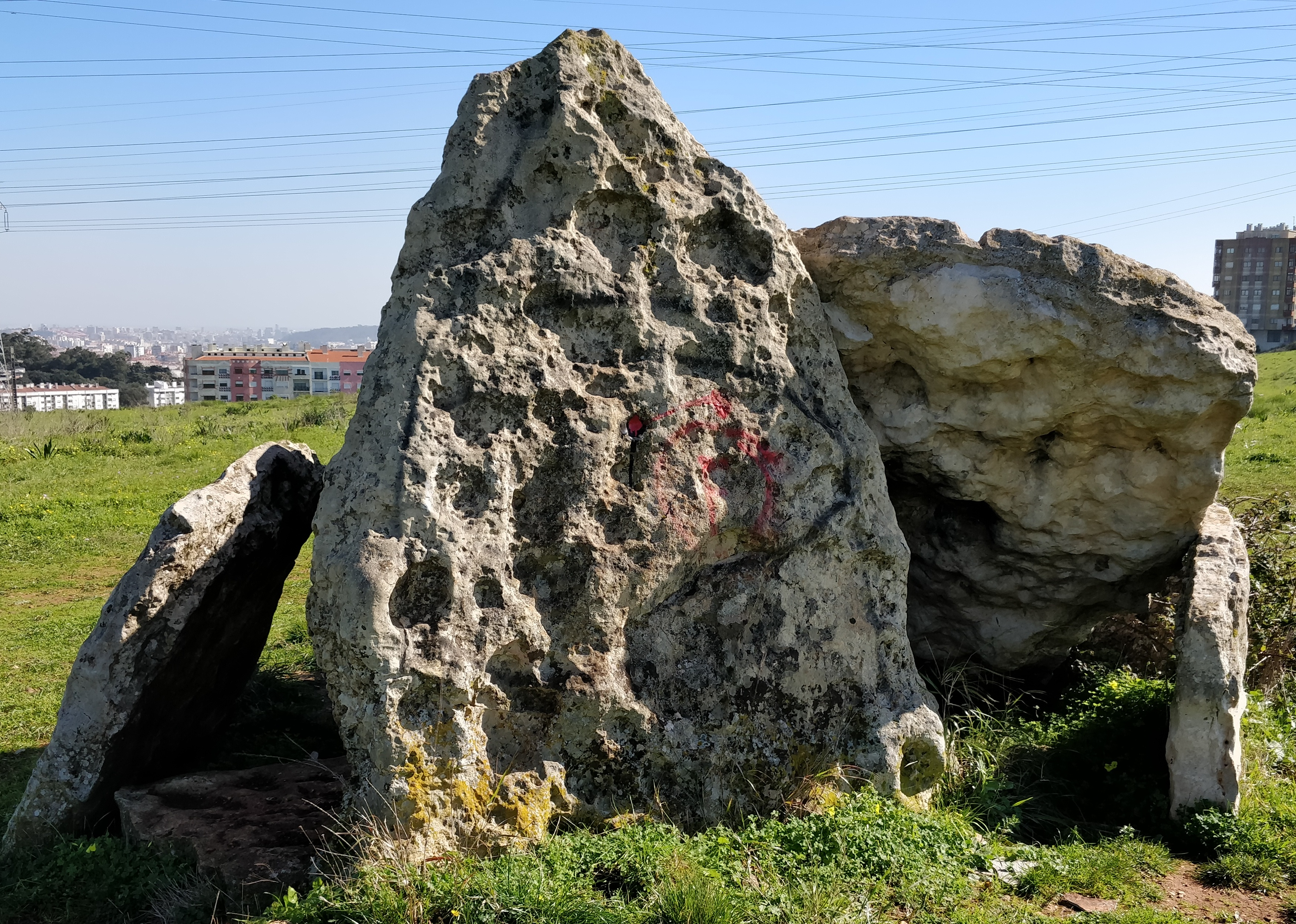
- The dolmen in 2019
- Interactive map of Anta do Monte Abraão
- 38°46′05″N 9°15′53″W
- Type: Dolmen
- Periods: Late neolithic
- Location: Belas, Lisbon, Portugal

History
- Built: c. 3250 BC

Site notes
- Excavation dates: 1876-1878
- Archaeologists: Carlos Ribeiro
- Discovered: 1876 by Carlos Ribeiro
- Owner: Public
- Public access: Yes

The Anta do Monte Abraão was a megalithic dolmen located in the parish of Monte Abraão, in Queluz, Sintra Municipality, Lisbon District, Portugal. The dolmen was first identified in 1876, by Carlos Ribeiro, who carried out excavations until 1878 and published his results in 1880. Excavations suggest that it served as a tomb for about 80 individuals and that it dates back to the middle to end of the Neolithic period (4000-2500 BC). The Anta do Monte Abraão and the nearby Anta da Pedra dos Mouros (also known as the Anta do Senhor da Serra) and Anta da Estria are collectively known as the Antas de Belas.

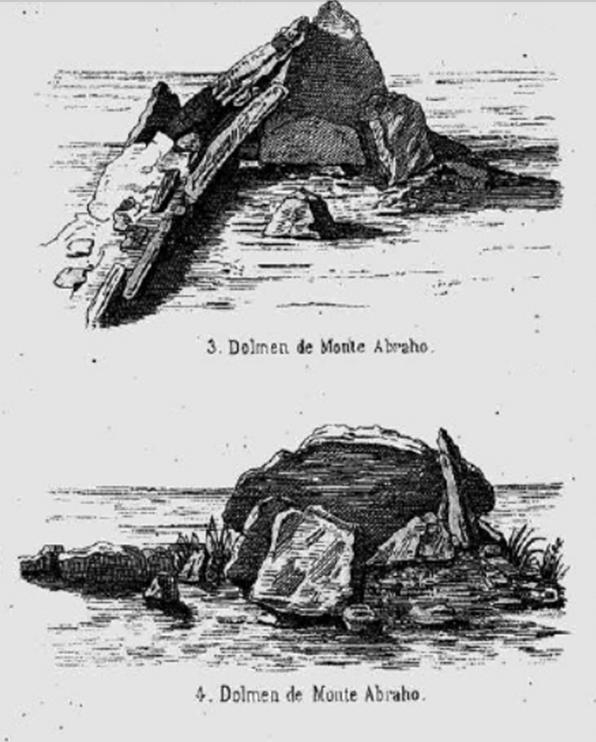
Two drawings by Ribeiro of the dolmen

The burial chamber of the Anta do Monte Abraão had an east-west orientation. It had at least six upright limestone supporting stones or orthostats and three of these were found in situ by Ribeiro. The polygonal chamber had a diameter of 3.6 metres, approached by an 8 metre corridor that was 2 metres wide. Subsequent work by Vergílio Correia Pinto da Fonseca identified limited drawings on some stones. Despite the destruction of the tomb, excavations have yielded numerous finds, including stone axes, flint tools and blades, flint arrowheads, club heads, pottery ceramics, clay vessels and objects of adornment. These are exhibited at the Portuguese Geological Museum in Lisbon.

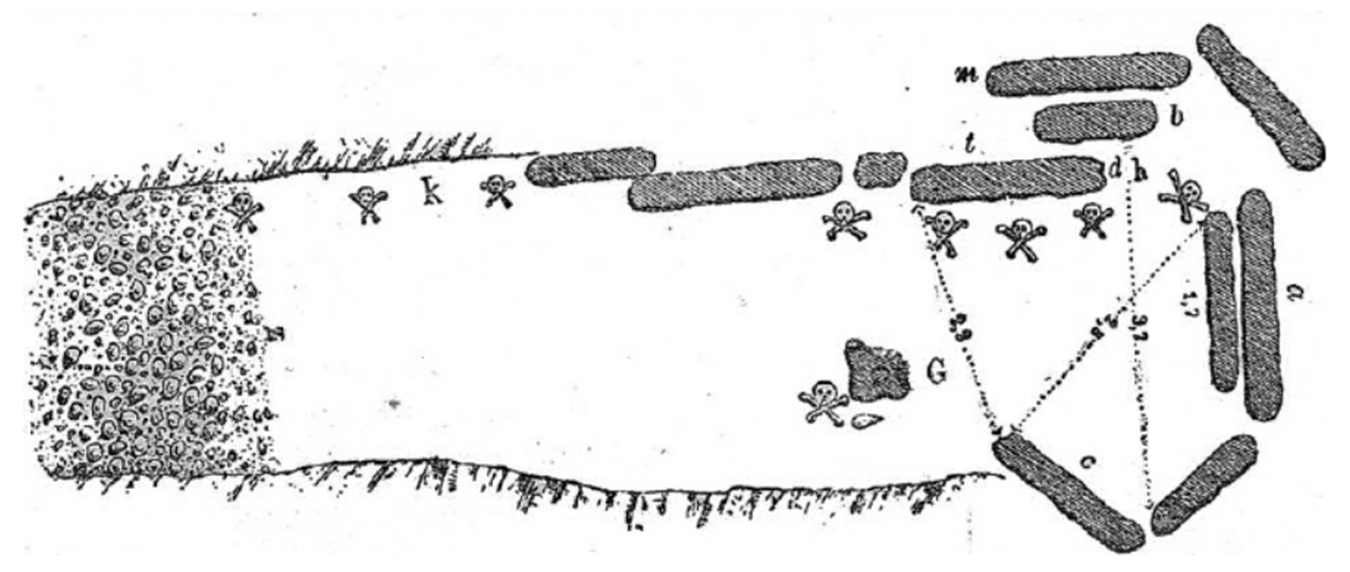
Sketch by Ribeiro of the plan of the dolmen

Apart from the visit by Da Fonseca, Ribeiro’s findings attracted little interest in the dolmen until the 1960s, when archaeologists became concerned about the possible destruction of the Antas de Belas as a result of urban expansion and highway construction. In addition, the Anta do Monte Abrãao was threatened by the activity of a quarry located in its vicinity. The present condition of the stones is poor and extensive graffiti is visible.
