= Montforter Zwischentöne =

- Status: active
- Genre: arts & science festival
- Frequency: three times per year
- Locations: Feldkirch, Vorarlberg
- Country: Austria
- Inaugurated: 2015
- Next event: 7–14 juni 2026
- Website: https://www.montforterzwischentoene.at/

Montforter Zwischentöne (literally: Intermediate tones of Montfort) is a contemporary festival for arts, science and dialogue in Feldkirch, Vorarlberg (Austria). It was founded in 2015.

== History ==
The Montforter Zwischentöne festival was founded in 2015 by the city of Feldkirch on the occasion of the opening of the newly built Montforthaus Feldkirch. For the establishment of the festival, an association of the same name had been founded. The festival is sponsored by the corresponding association, funded by the city of Feldkirch and the state of Vorarlberg.

The first edition (2015) was called „Anfangen: über das Beginnen“ ("Starting: on beginning").

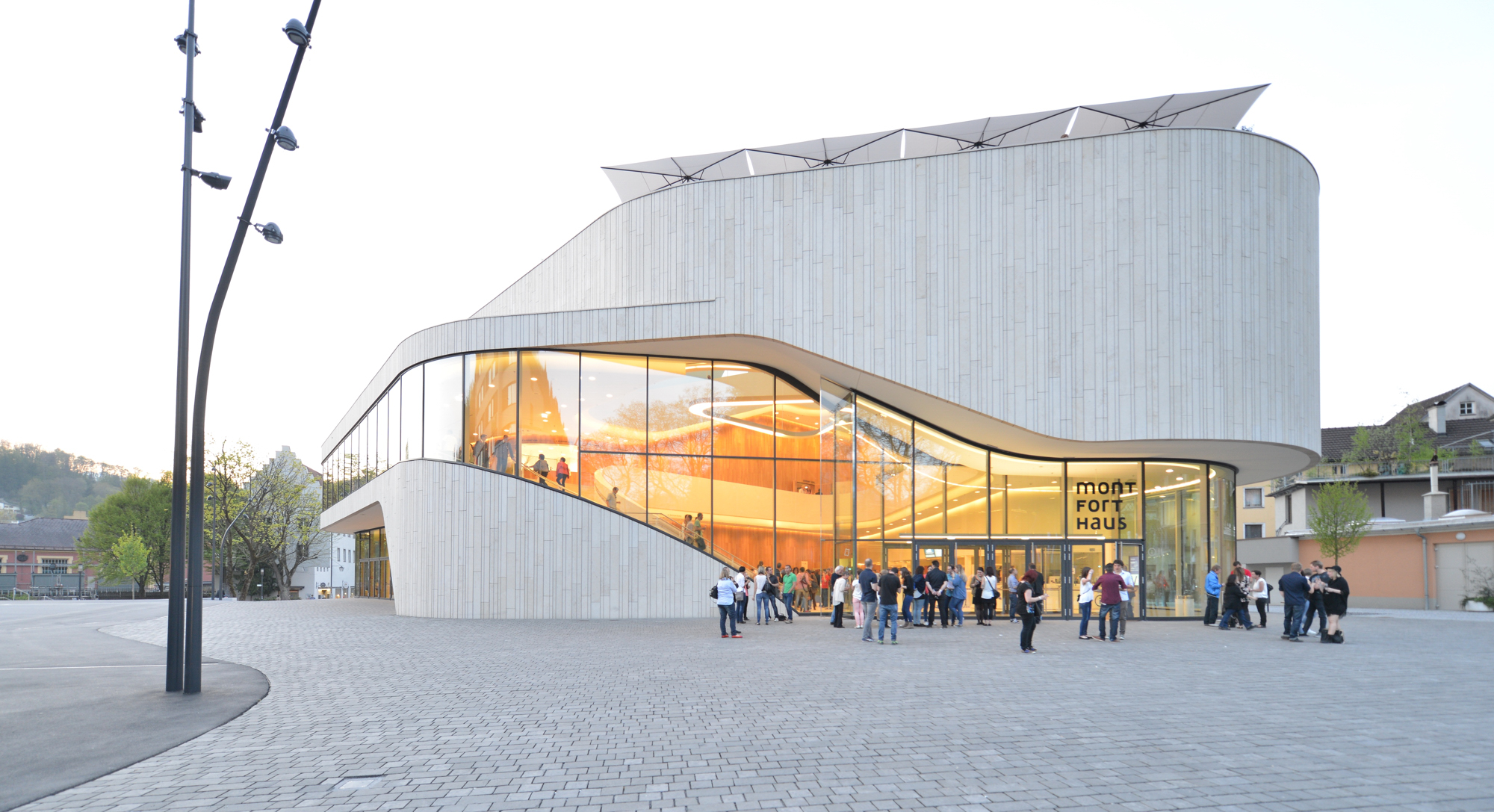
The Montforthaus in Feldkirch

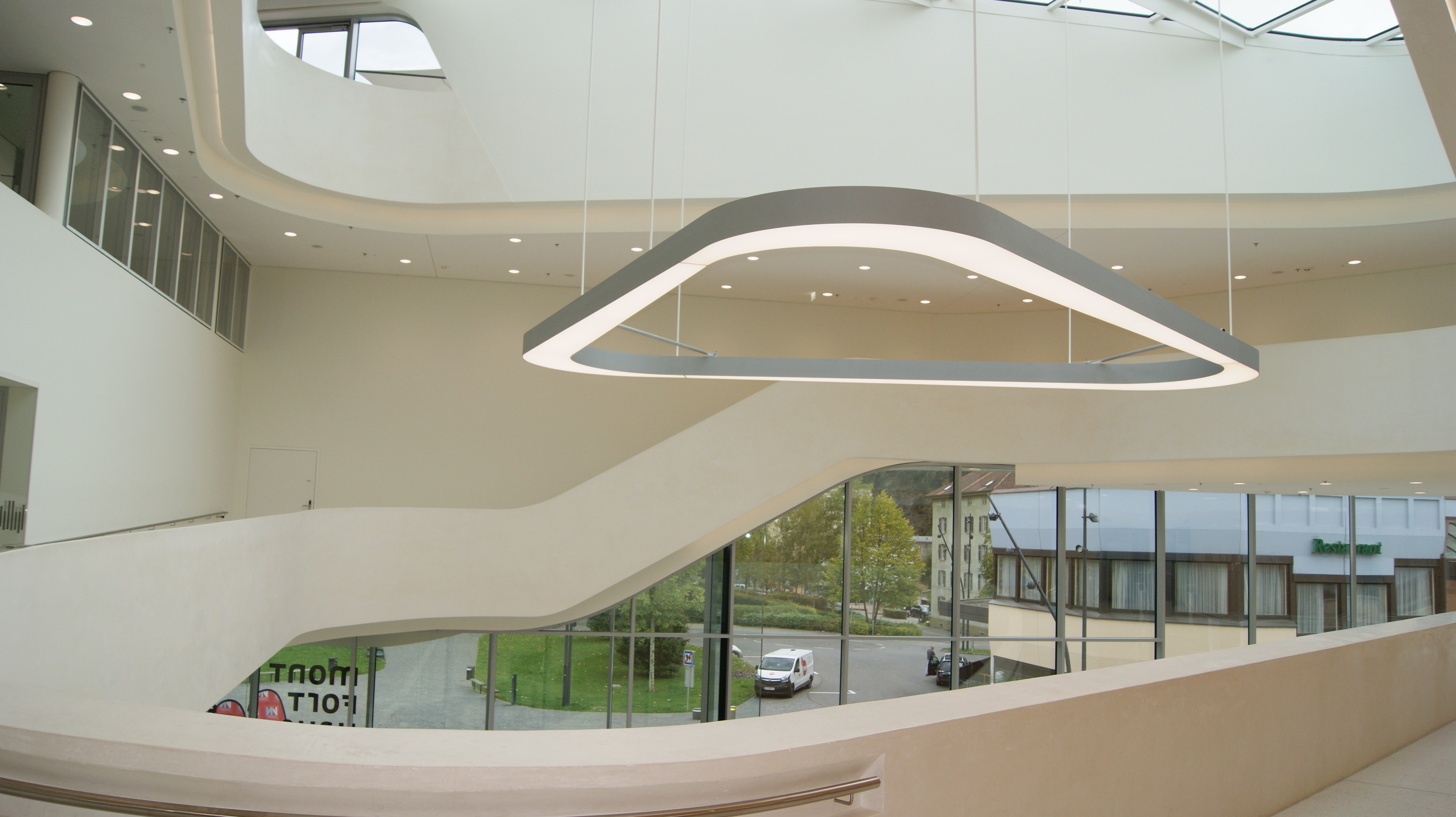
Inside the Montforthaus

== Programme and content ==
Montforter Zwischentöne takes place on three weekends a year. Each series of events revolves around a certain topic by means of artistic and dramaturgical interpretations of everyday culture. In doing so, the festival encompasses many genres and fields like music, architecture, poetry, design, science and dance.

The festival addresses issues of social and personal development on site and provides impetus for urban and regional development in cooperation with the spatial development planning of town and country. The Montforter Zwischentöne act as a model laboratory for new formats with thematic orientation embedded in a regional context. The festival's concept is to move beyond the culture of representation and genre orientation.

In addition to the constant process of redefining forms and formats, an important principle of the Montforter Zwischentöne is actually lived sustainability. Large touring productions are avoided, artists are encouraged to stay over an extended period of time (artists-in-residence) instead of doing one-evening performances, and there is regional catering.

The two artistic directors Hans-Joachim Gögl and Folkert Uhde are responsible for the basic dramaturgical conception and the vast majority of the format developments.

Michael Stallknecht (NZZ, 24 February 2017) summarises the concept of the festival briefly as follows:

“The "Montforter Zwischentöne" in Feldkirch are a glimpse into the future of music festivals and give new meaning to the notion of festivals.”

=== Competition and prize ===
The so-called Hugo (»Hugo – Internationaler Wettbewerb für neue Konzertformate«) is an international student competition for new concert formats of the Montforter Zwischentöne. It is a platform for experimentation and reflection. The background to the competition is to enable students to deal with new concert formats in a process-based manner. The artistic directors of the Montforter Zwischenentöne design workshops, coaching phases and a public feedback process with renowned experts. The competition specifications are an annually changing theme, a clearly defined performance location and the duration of the concert. The winning team wins the professional implementation of its concert design as part of the festival.

The prize is named after the minstrel Hugo von Montfort, 1357 to 1423, the first musician in the Vorarlberg region, whose work is still known today.

== See also ==
- Lichtstadt Feldkirch
- Potentiale
- Poolbar Festival
