= Lichtstadt Feldkirch =

- Status: Active
- Genre: Light art festival
- Frequency: Bi-annually
- Venue: City centre of Feldkirch (outdoor)
- Location: Feldkirch
- Country: Austria
- Inaugurated: 2018
- Next event: 2023
- Attendance: 30.000 (2018)
- Area: Vorarlberg
- Website: https://www.lichtstadt.at/

Lichtstadt Feldkirch ("City of Light Feldkirch") is a light art festival in Feldkirch in the Austrian state of Vorarlberg. It was first held in 2018. It is planned that the festival be held every two years.

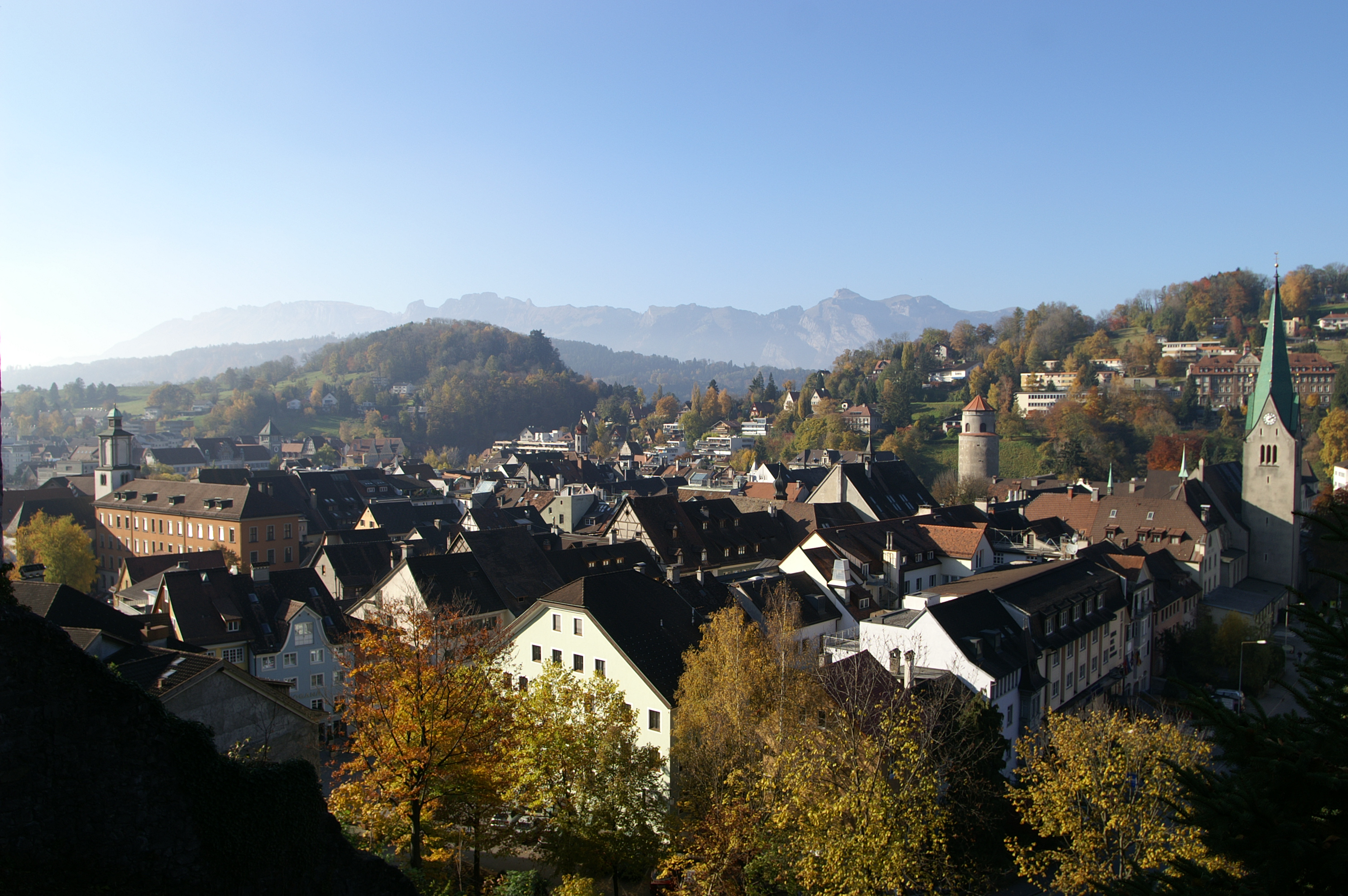
The old city centre of Feldkirch is the location of the light art festival Lichtstadt Feldkirch

== The festival ==
Lichtstadt Feldkirch is a four-day biennial light show in the city of Feldkirch. In the nighttime, light installations are presented at ten different venues. Many of the projects are created for the respective location. The installations are free and barrier-free accessible.

"As a scene for light art, the urban space offers numerous unexplored possibilities to experience our present through architecture, light and technology, to break viewing habits or to illuminate the past. [...] Artistic development can be made possible and thus different thematic or technically innovative focal points can be set will." – Lichtstadt Association

Asynchronous to the main events, the smaller "Spotlight" events have been taking place since 2020, each of which focuses on an artist or a group of artists.

The festival and the "Spotlight" series are organized by the non-profit association "Lichtstadt", which was founded in 2017.

== Timeline ==
=== 2025 ===
The fourth edition took place from 9–12 October 2025. More than 15 installations were presented, featuring contributions by the following artists: Miriam Hamann, Katja Heitmann, mutual loop, RatAess, Squidsoup, Sofia Hagen, Miriam Prantl, Robert Sochacki, Ingo Wendt, Gudrun Barenbrock, Brigitte Kowanz, Klaus Obermaier, Jan Philip Scheibe, and Collectif Scale.

=== 2023 ===
The third edition took place from 4–7 October 2023. The international artists and artist collectives Tony Oursler, OchoReSotto, Ruth Schnell and Martin Kusch (kondition pluriel), Thilo Frank, and François Morellet realized eight different installations and projections. The festival was attended by more than 35,000 people.

=== 2021 ===
The 2021 edition took place from 6–9 October 2021. The international artists and artist collectives OchoReSotto, Peter Kogler, Brigitte Kowanz, David Reumüller, NEON GOLDEN, artificialOwl and DUNDU realized mappings, installations, projections and interactive works in the second edition.

=== 2020 ===
The 2020 edition of the festival was postponed to 2021 due to COVID-19.

=== 2018 ===
The first edition in 2018 was held to celebrate the 800th anniversary year of the city of Feldkirch. It took place from October 3 to 6, 2018. Ten projects by international artists, e.g. Ólafur Elíasson, transformed the old town into a large open-air museum at nightfall. Installations, sculptures, projections on facades and floor as well as laser projections, mappings and light objects were part of the light art festival.

== See also ==
- Poolbar Festival
- Schubertiade Vorarlberg
- Montforter Zwischentöne
