= Feldkirch, Vorarlberg =

Town in Vorarlberg, Austria

Feldkirch
- Municipality
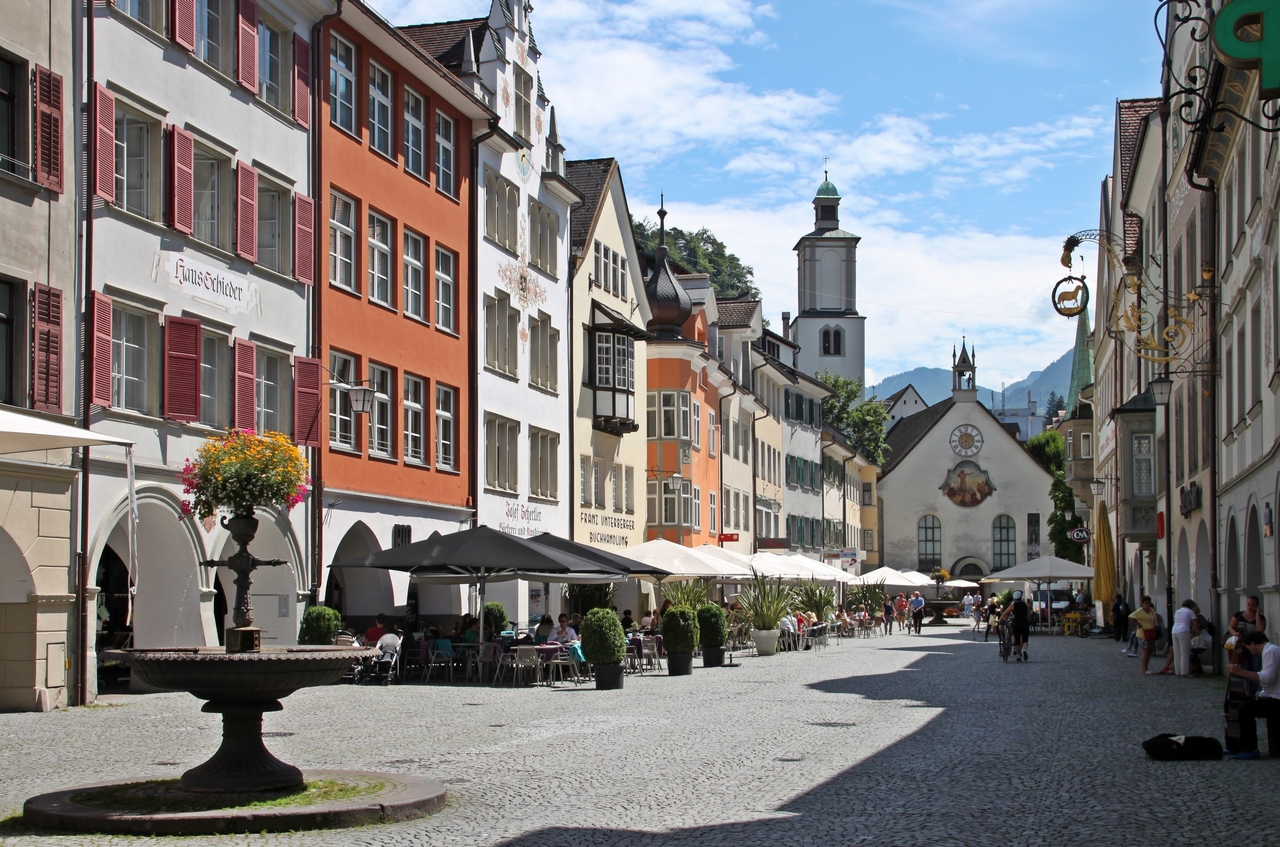
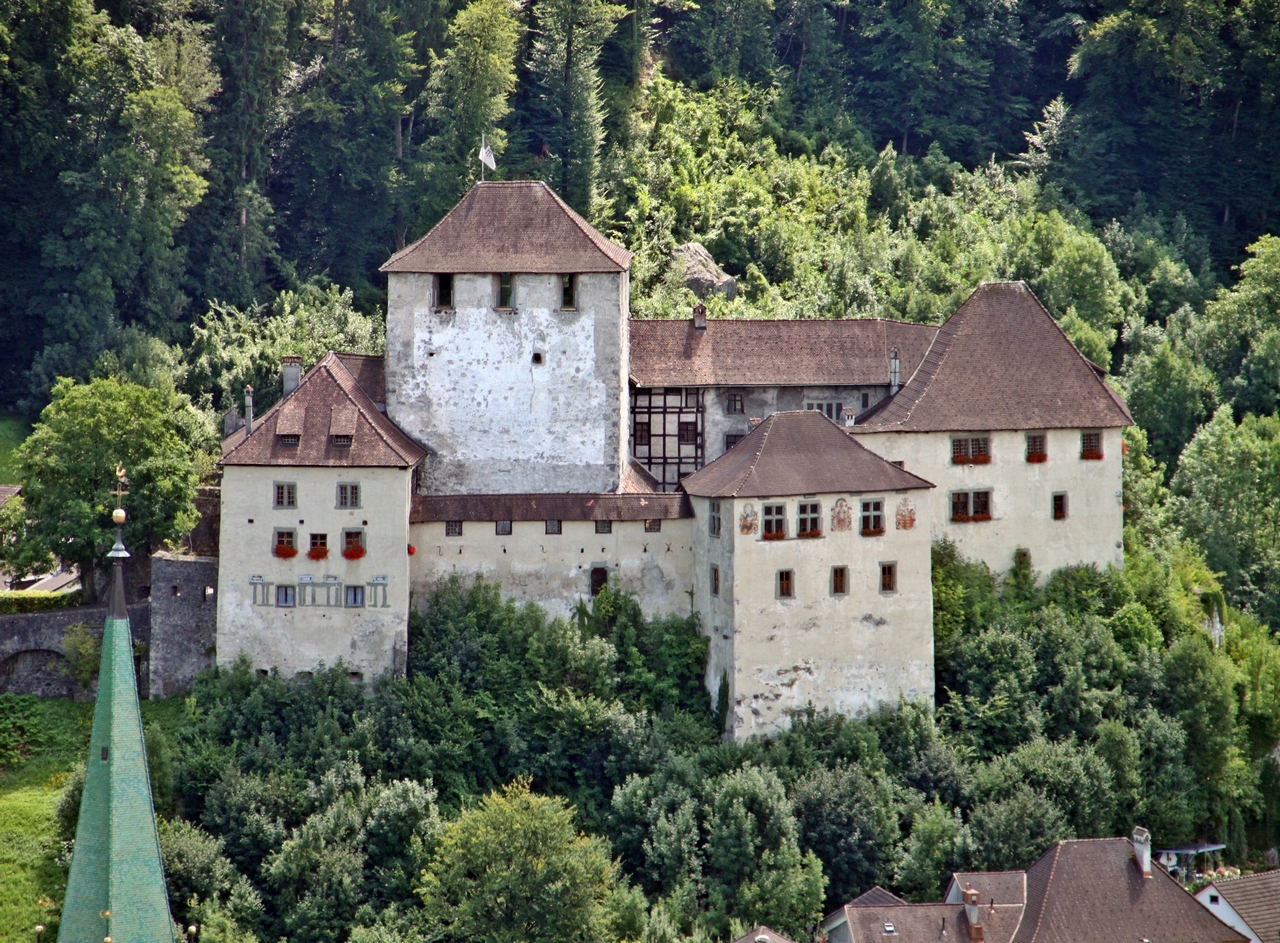
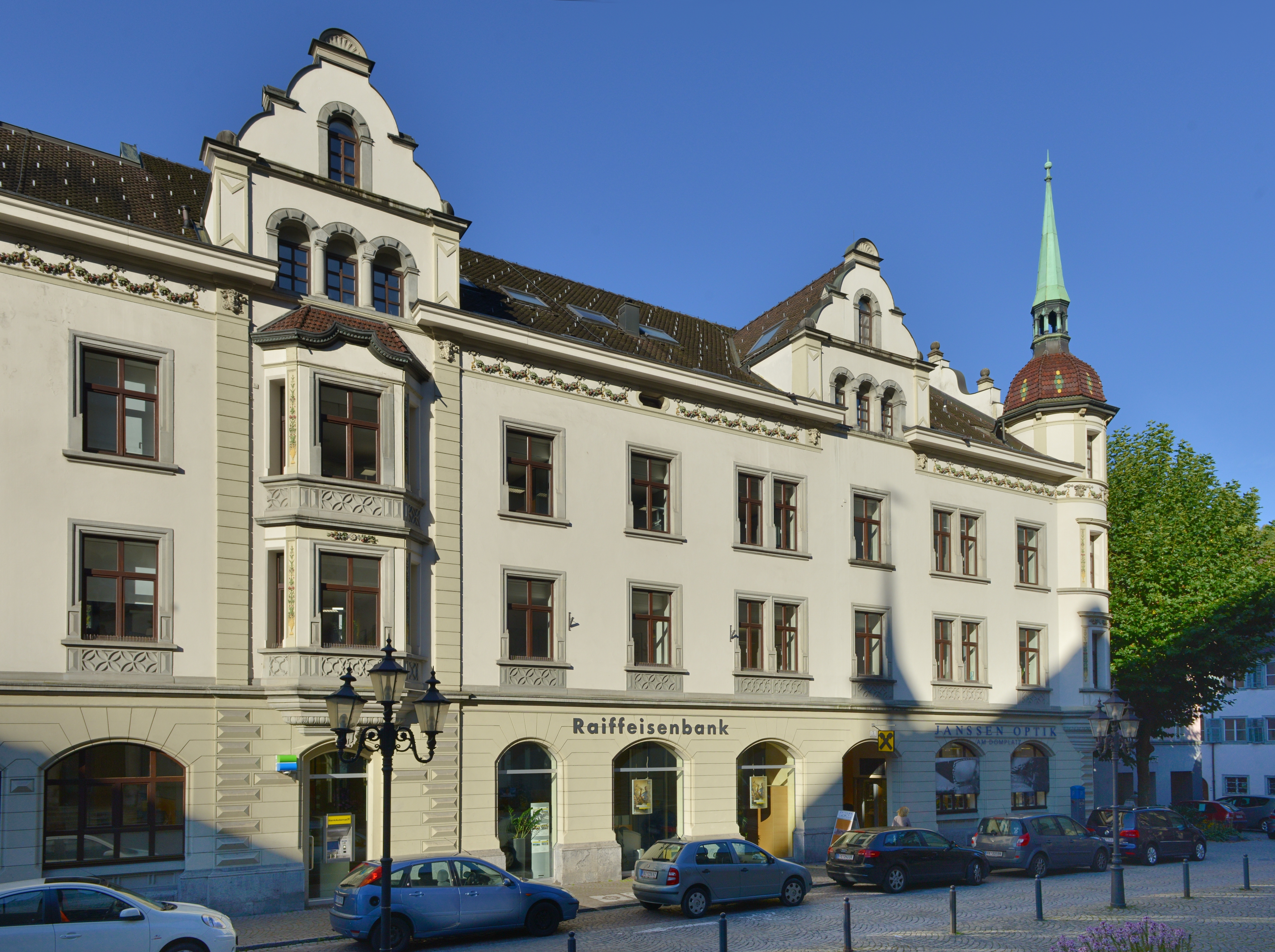
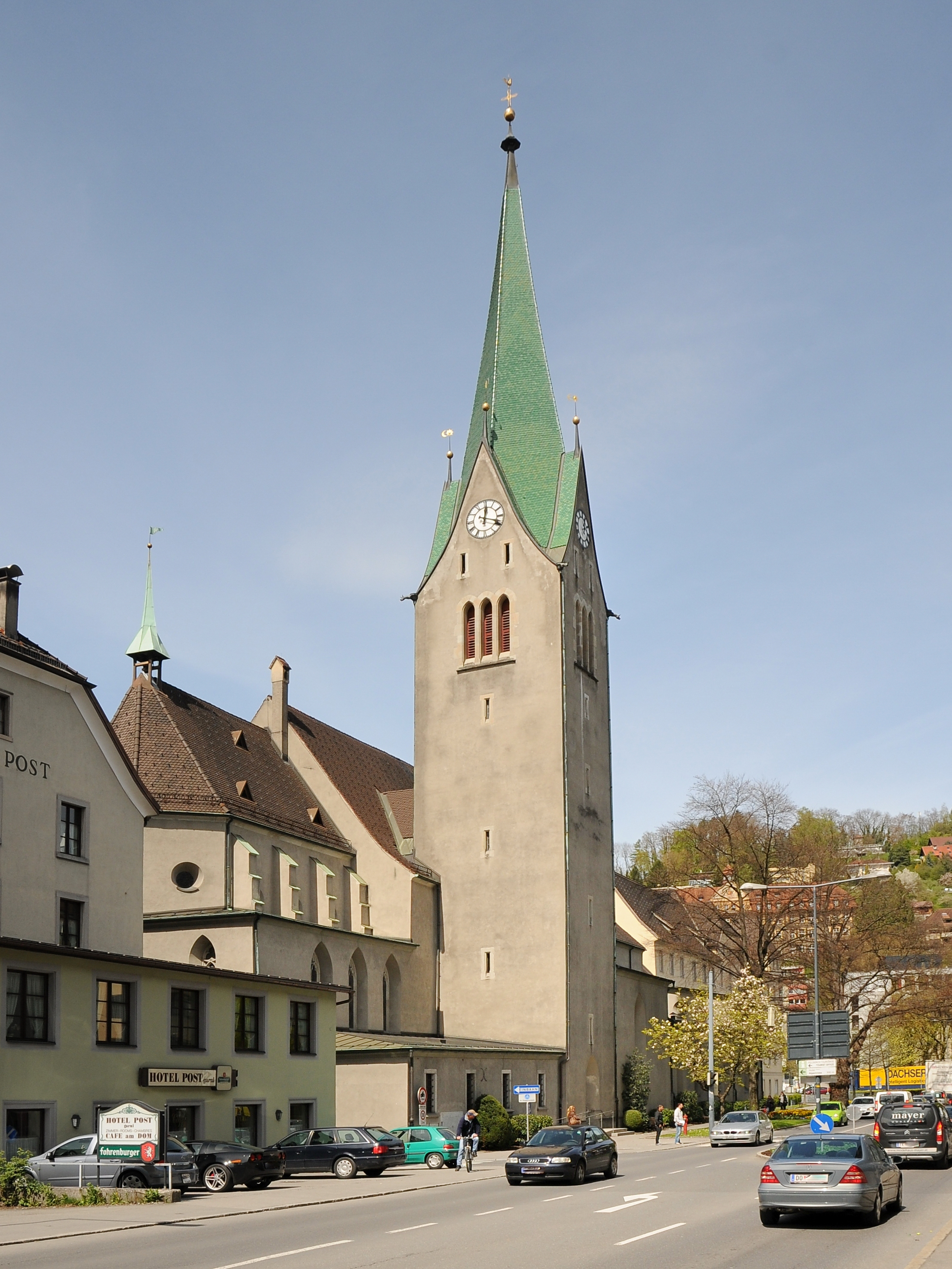
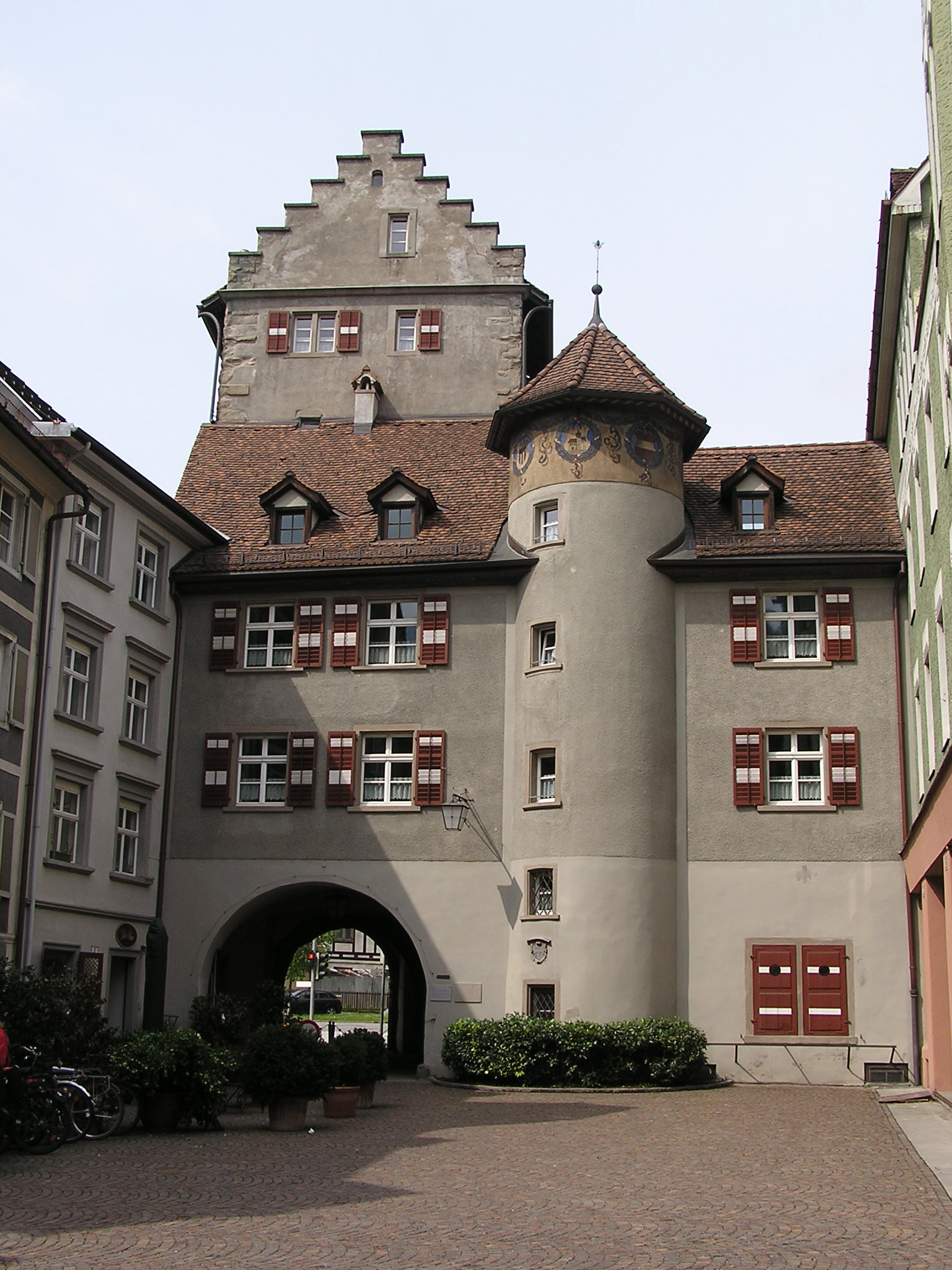
- from top, left to right: Old town Market street, Schattenburg, Old Post Office, Feldkirch Cathedral, Churertor

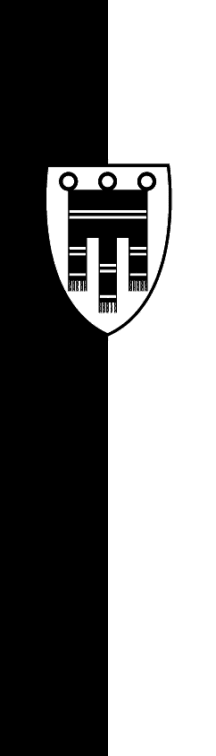
- Flag Coat of arms

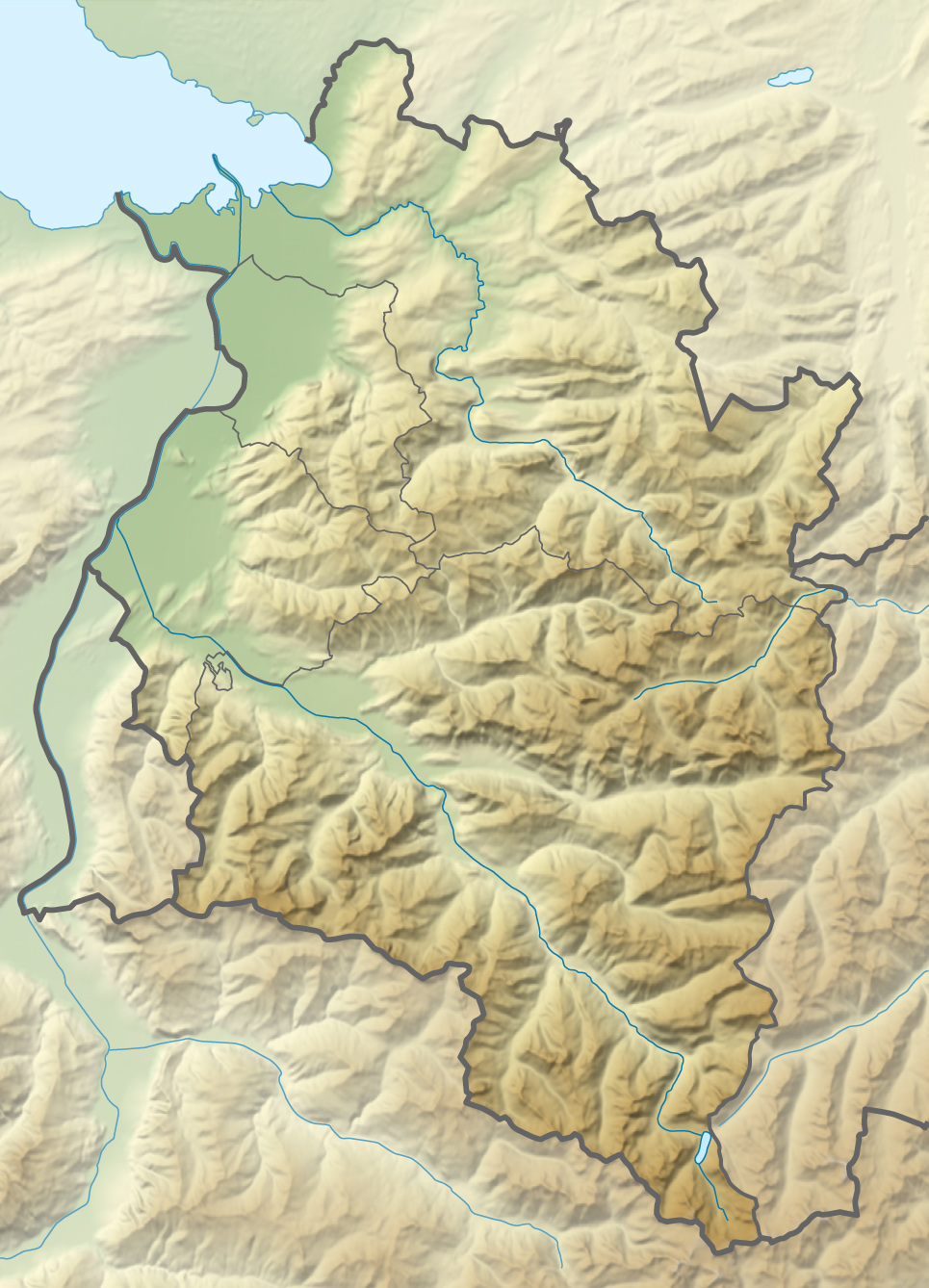
- Location within Vorarlberg Location within Austria
- Coordinates: 47°14′17″N 09°35′54″E
- Country: Austria
- State: Vorarlberg
- District: Feldkirch

Government
  - Mayor: Manfred Rädler (ÖVP)

Area
  - Total: 34.34 km^{2} (13.26 sq mi)
- Elevation: 458 m (1,503 ft)

Population (2018-01-01)
  - Total: 33,420
  - Density: 973.2/km^{2} (2,521/sq mi)
- Time zone: UTC+1 (CET)
  - Summer (DST): UTC+2 (CEST)
- Postal code: 6800
- Area code: 05522
- Vehicle registration: FK
- Website: www.feldkirch.at

Feldkirch (Austrian German pronunciation: [ˈfɛldkɪrç]) is a town in the western Austrian state of Vorarlberg, bordering on Switzerland and Liechtenstein. It is the administrative centre of the Feldkirch district. After Dornbirn, it is the second most populous town in Vorarlberg. The westernmost point in Austria lies in Feldkirch on the river Rhine, at the tripoint between Austria, Switzerland, and Liechtenstein.

== History ==
Clunia was a Roman settlement, probably a weigh station, which was located where present-day Feldkirch lies. It was on a road between Mediolanum (modern Milan) and Brigantium.

Feldkirch's medieval town, which remains well preserved to this day, was mentioned as a city for the first time in 1218, after Count Hugo von Montfort built the "Schattenburg", a castle which still is the major landmark of Feldkirch. Other sights in the town include the Gothic-style cathedral of St. Nikolaus. Feldkirch was the birthplace of Rheticus, and is currently the seat of the Roman Catholic Diocese of Feldkirch. From 1651 to 1773 and from 1856 to 1979, Feldkirch was the home of the Jesuit school Stella Matutina.

March 1799 saw two clashes between the forces of the French First Republic and the Habsburg monarchy. On the 7th, Nicolas Oudinot, with 9,000 French soldiers, defeated Friedrich Freiherr von Hotze and his 6,000 Austrians. The Battle of Feldkirch occurred on 23 March, when André Masséna and 12,000 Frenchmen were beaten by Franjo Jelačić and a force of 5,500 Austrians.

== Town subdivisions ==
- Feldkirch
- Altenstadt
- Gisingen
- Levis
- Nofels
- Tisis
- Tosters

== Population ==
Historical population
Year	Pop.	±%
1869	6,186	—
1880	7,322	+18.4%
1890	8,039	+9.8%
1900	9,755	+21.3%
1910	11,830	+21.3%
1923	11,896	+0.6%
1934	12,909	+8.5%
1939	13,067	+1.2%
1951	15,115	+15.7%
1961	17,343	+14.7%
1971	21,751	+25.4%
1981	23,745	+9.2%
1991	26,730	+12.6%
2001	28,607	+7.0%
2011	30,975	+8.3%
2014	31,428	+1.5%
2015	31,824	+1.3%

Largest groups of foreign residents
Nationality	Population (2026)
Germany	2,231
Turkey	896
Romania	491
Bosnia and Herzegovina	435
Hungary	432
Syria	424
Afghanistan	363
Italy	352
Croatia	341
Ukraine	246
Serbia	216
Poland	167
Slovakia	159
Kosovo	150
Slovenia	122
Bulgaria	105
Russian Federation	103
Iraq	68
Czech Republic	62
Iran	50
North Macedonia	46

== Economy and infrastructure ==
=== Transport ===
Feldkirch has had its own local bus network since 1993. It currently consists of eight lines, including buses which run to the north of neighbouring Liechtenstein. The bus system cooperates with Vorarlberg's regional bus system.

There are several railway stations in the municipality of Feldkirch. The main station is Feldkirch, which is an intermediate stop on Vorarlberg's main railway line and the eastern terminus of the Feldkirch–Buchs railway. The station is served by Railjet long-distance services to Zurich HB, Wien Hbf, Budapest Keleti and Bratislava-Petržalka and regional trains of Vorarlberg S-Bahn. The other stations are Altenstadt, Feldkirch Amberg, Gisingen and Tisis, which are only served by Vorarlberg S-Bahn.

The nearest airports are St. Gallen–Altenrhein Airport, located 39 km (24 mi) north west and Zurich Airport, located 136 km (85 mi) to the west of Feldkirch.

=== Companies ===
The following companies and service organizations are based in Feldkirch:

- Bachmann Electronic
- Vorarlberg Milch
- Lingenhöle Technologie
- Stadtwerke Feldkirch
- KSW Tankstellen- und Industrieanlagenbau
- Gebäudereinigung Bauer
- Landeskrankenhaus Feldkirch

== Culture and landmarks ==
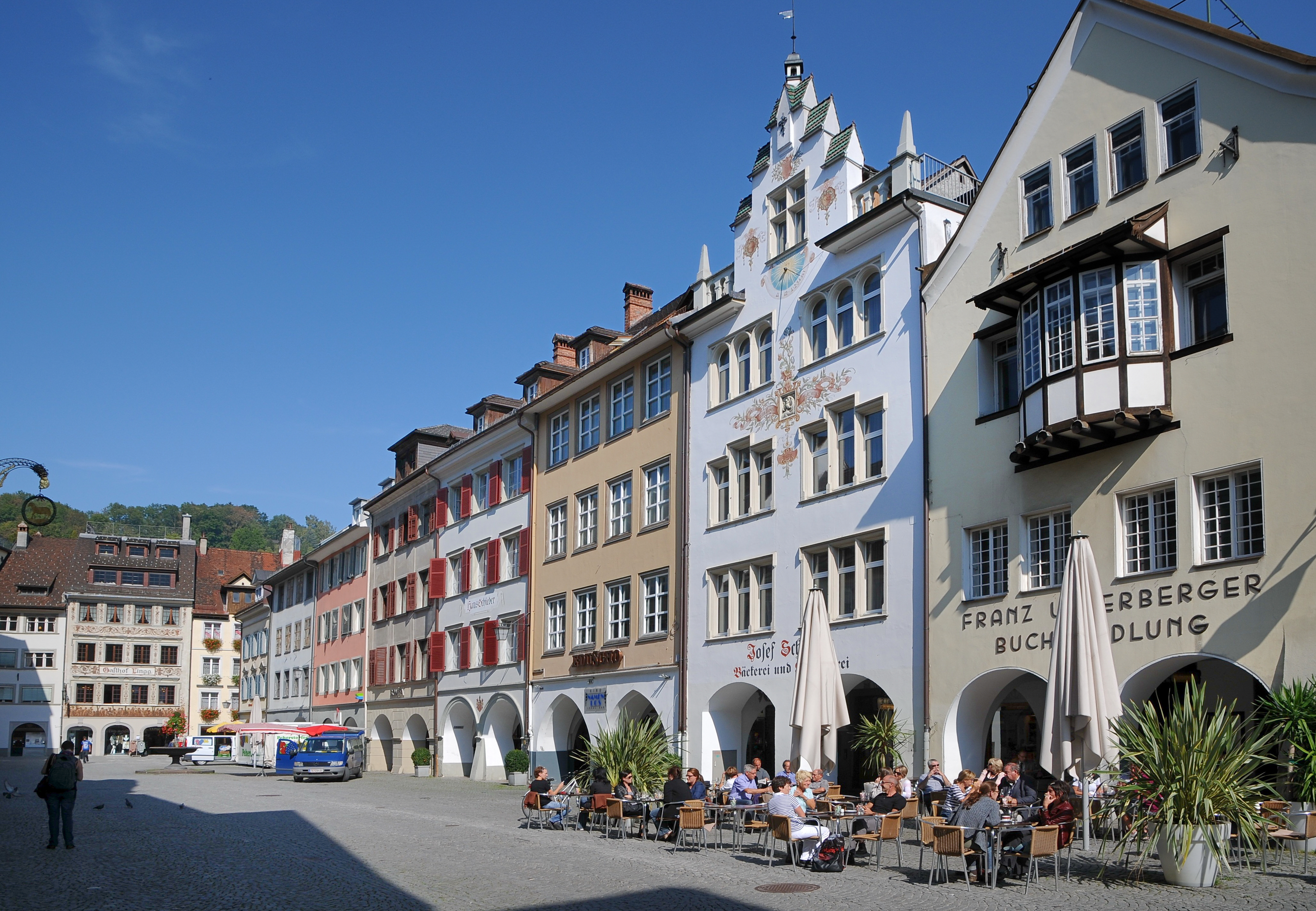
Market place in the city of Feldkirch

=== Central Feldkirch ===
Feldkirch has one of the best preserved medieval townscapes of Vorarlberg. The town was built around 1200 and has a geometric grid system. Since around 1500, when the city wall was rebuilt, the city has remained unchanged over the centuries.

Since 2015, the Feldkirch Municipal Ensemble has been listed in the Austrian List of Cultural Heritage (cultural property protected by the Hague Convention). The city is also a member of the Association of Small Historic Towns, a tourism marketing association.

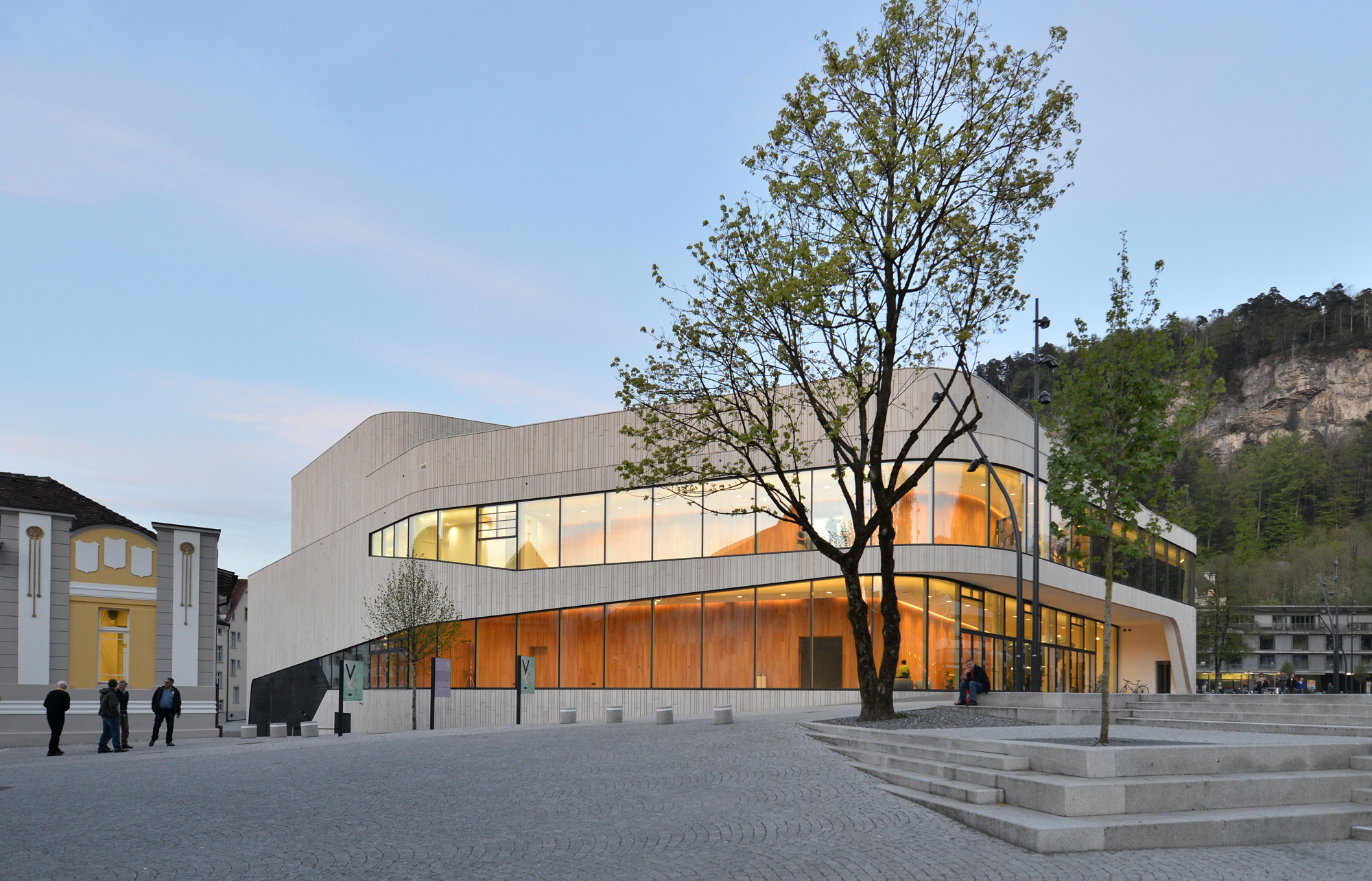
The renovated Montforthaus in the historic city centre of Feldkirch

In 2015, the Montforthaus Feldkirch was newly renovated. It is a public venue for cultural activities like balls, trade fairs, concerts and theatre performances.

The town was mentioned in the 1969 Bond film, when the Bond and Tracy characters were discussing which place had the nearest telephone booth.

=== City fortification ===
The streets of the Schlossgraben, Hirschgraben and St. Leonhardsplatz marked the former course of the city wall surrounding the Neustadt area in the 13th century. The wall was largely rebuilt around 1500, and torn down in many places beginning in 1826.

When Feldkirch was surrounded by a city wall and a city moat, one could enter the city only through one of its four gates. These city gates were called Bregenzertor or Nikolaustor, Bludenzertor or Schultor, Milltor or Sautor, and Churertor or Salztor. The last two gates are still standing, the other two were removed together with the city wall at the beginning of the 19th century.

The Katzenturm (cat tower) or colloquially Dicker Turm (fat tower) is a defense tower built in 1507 as part of the city wall's Hirschgraben. The 8-storey round and 40 m high tower was built as part of the city fortifications under the reign of Emperor Maximilian I from 1491 to 1507. In the 17th century, the bell room for the Katzenturmglocke (cat tower bell) named "Maria Rochus" was built. The bell is the biggest in Vorarlberg^{(as of 2022)} and weighs 8,5 t. The tower has an image of the Virgin Mary restored by Florus Scheel in the 19th century. The origin of the name Katzenturm has not been fully clarified to this day. One theory is that it got its name from the heavy artillery that the fortified tower was equipped with at the time. These were decorated with a lion's head, popularly referred to as a "cat".

=== Castles and palaces ===
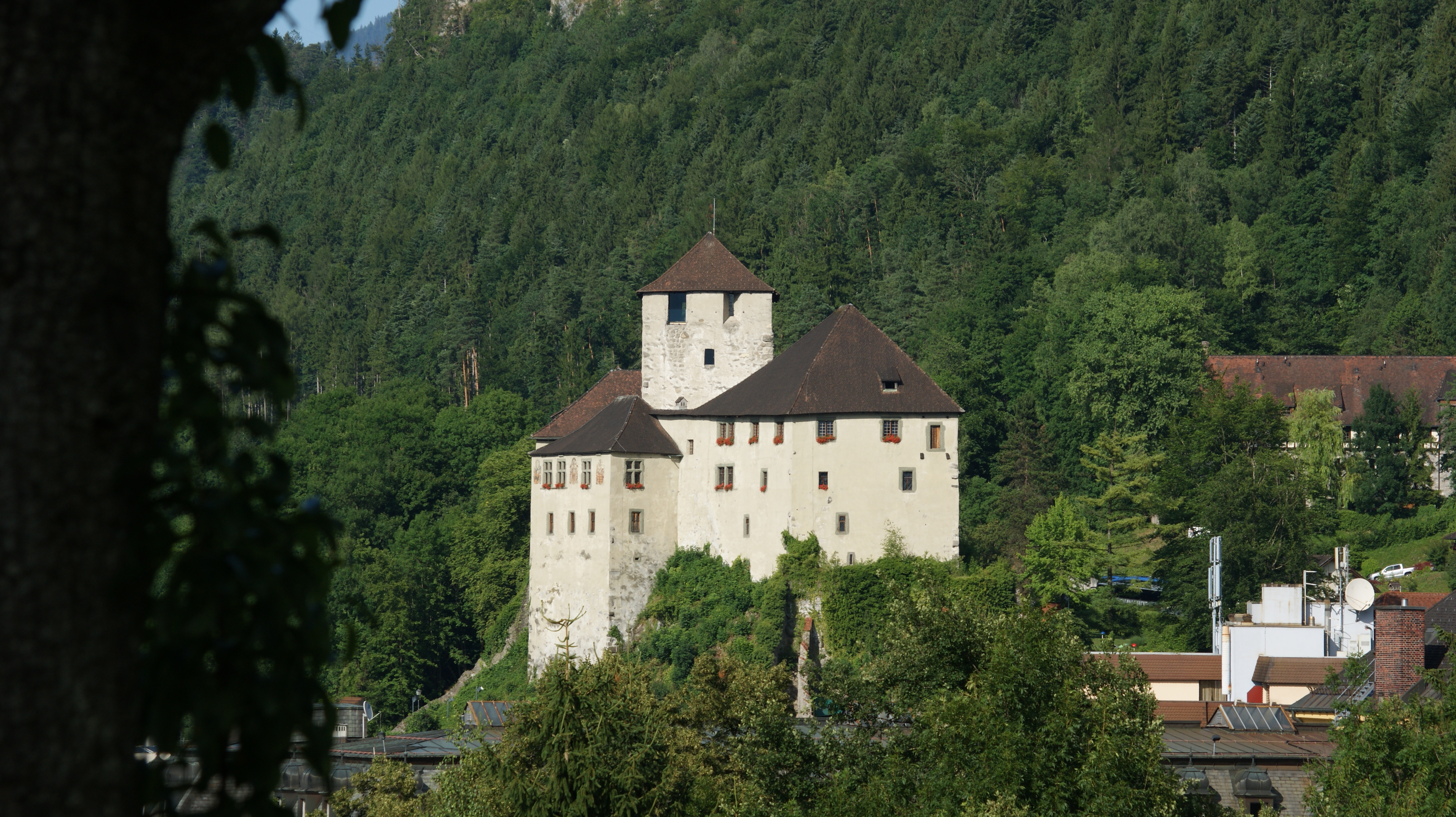
- The Schattenburg in Feldkirch
  Schattenburg: The Schattenburg castle was the seat of the counts of Montfort until 1390. The first construction phase began around 1230 under Hugo I of Montfort, the founder of the city. Under Count Friedrich von Toggenburg (1416–1436) and under the Vogt Hans of Königsegg extensions and transformations of the Schattenburg castle were built in the 15th century. After the counts lost their power, the castle was repeatedly put up for auction, and was even to be demolished in 1813. Since 1825 the castle has been owned by the town of Feldkirch, which at that time acquired it for 833 florins. The castle then served as barracks, and later as accommodation for the poor. The castle owes its rescue and revitalization to the Museum and Homeland Security Association for Feldkirch and the Surrounding Area which was founded in 1912. The upper floors are home to a museum of local history that attracts about 25,000 visitors annually.
- Ruins of Tosters: The ruins of a hill castle on a hillside part of the Schellenberg, in the Feldkirch district of Tosters.
- Palais Liechtenstein: In today's form, the house was built in the Schlossergasse No. 8 after the town fire of 1697, as an office building for the prince Johann Adam Andreas of Liechtenstein in Baroque style. In 1848 it became the property of Andreas Ritter of Tschavoll, at that time Feldkirch mayor and manufacturer. The town acquired the palais in 1967 and today the building is used as an exhibition centre. It is home of the cultural council, and also the seat of the city library and the city archives.

=== Villas and other residential buildings ===
In the 19th century the Feldkirch bourgeoisie built a number of prestigious residential buildings, most of which are still privately owned. The villas were built mostly on the Reichsstraße, mainly in the area between the Bärenkreuzung and the train station.

=== Cultural events ===
The Montforter Zwischentöne is an interdisciplinary festival that takes place three times a year. Each series is based on a specific topic which is artistically and dramaturgically interpreted without genre-orientated boundaries. There are contributions from the fields of music, poetry, architecture, science, dance etc. The festival addresses issues of social and personal development on site and provides impetus for urban and regional development.

The Poolbar Festival is a modern music and cultural festival in Feldkirch. Held annually in July and August, it attracts around 20,000 visitors; it features music, exhibitions, poetry slams, fashion and an architectural prize. It was first held in 1994 as a cultural summer-academy and is, in its organization and implementation of landscape and architecture, very different from other open-air events.

The bi-annual light art festival Lichtstadt Feldkirch lets international artists fill the city of Feldkirch with light objects, projections and sculptures. Its first edition was held in 2018 and attracted 30.000 visitors.

The POTENTIALe (formerly 'ArtDesign Feldkirch') is an art fair and festival at which about 110 exhibitors present their products and ideas. In addition to a vintage market, there are workshops and discussion groups, a design laboratory, photography exhibitions, and music and films are presented. The aim of the festival is to establish a network of artists, craftsmen and customers that share the common vision of sustainable design.

The Feldkirch Festival (2001–2012) was an annual summer festival that offered theater performances, concerts and other cultural events.

The Wochenmarkt Feldkirch is a market in the Marktgasse in the city centre. At the market, fresh local produce and specialities like Bregenz Forest cheese are offered. It is open two days a week.

=== James Joyce and Feldkirch ===
The Irish writer James Joyce is inextricably linked to Feldkirch. In World War I, Joyce was mistaken for a spy at the border check in Feldkirch in 1915 and almost arrested. Thanks to influential friends, he was regarded as a "friendly foreigner". The Irishman saw this event at the Feldkirch train station as fateful. Subsequently, it influenced his most important work. In the summer of 1932, the friendship with the publisher couple Maria and Eugene Jolas brought the writer back to Feldkirch, where he stayed for several weeks at the Hotel Löwen and worked on Finnegans Wake (published 1939). During this stay, Joyce himself said that Ulysses (1922) was inextricably linked to Feldkirch: "Over there, on those tracks, the fate of 'Ulysses' was decided in 1915."

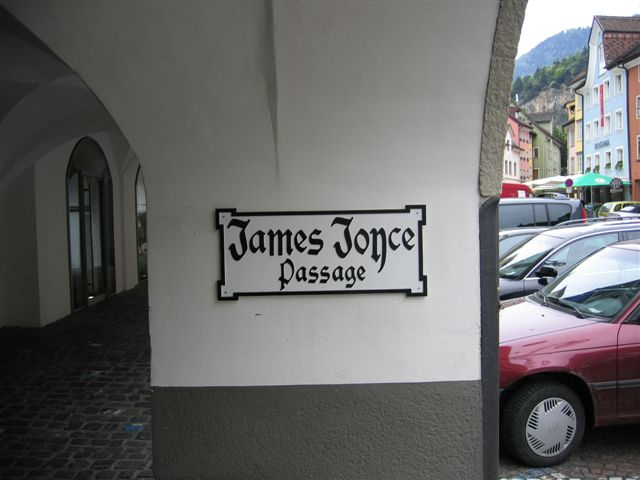
Official street sign: "James Joyce Passage"

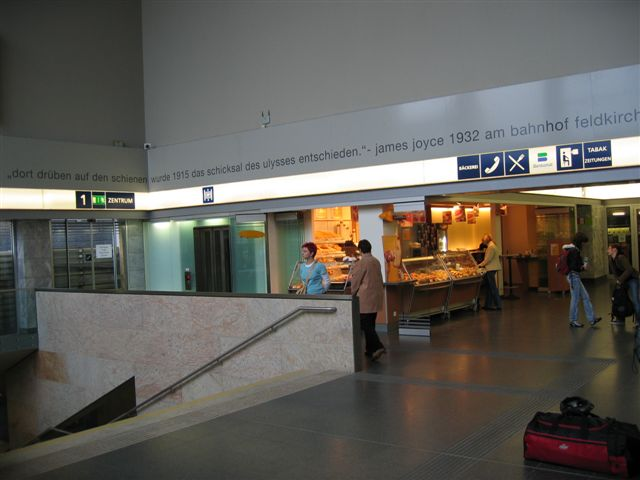
James Joyce quotation bar in the Feldkirch train station hall

=== Victoria, Four-Thirty ===
Chapter XII of Cecil Roberts' novel Victoria, Four-Thirty (published 1937) takes place in Feldkirch.

== Climate ==
Feldkirch has an oceanic climate (Cfb).

Feldkirch, Vorarlberg

Climate chart (precipitation, max. and min. temperature)
J	F	M	A	M	J	J	A	S	O	N	D
68 3 −3	65 5 −2	73 10 1	87 14 4	107 19 8	151 22 11	165 24 14	152 24 13	113 20 10	78 14 6	92 8 1	80 4 −2
- █ Average max. and min. temperatures in °C
- █ Precipitation totals in mm
- Source: ZAMG
Imperial conversion
J	F	M	A	M	J	J	A	S	O	N	D
2.7 37 27	2.6 41 28	2.9 50 34	3.4 57 39	4.2 66 46	5.9 72 52	6.5 75 57	6 75 55	4.4 68 50	3.1 57 43	3.6 46 34	3.1 39 28
- █ Average max. and min. temperatures in °F
- █ Precipitation totals in inches

Climate data for Feldkirch, Vorarlberg (1981–2022)
Month	Jan	Feb	Mar	Apr	May	Jun	Jul	Aug	Sep	Oct	Nov	Dec	Year
Record high °C (°F)	19.2 (66.6)	21.5 (70.7)	24.6 (76.3)	29.8 (85.6)	32.5 (90.5)	36.5 (97.7)	38.1 (100.6)	35.5 (95.9)	30.0 (86.0)	29.7 (85.5)	25.2 (77.4)	21.8 (71.2)	38.1 (100.6)
Mean daily maximum °C (°F)	3.4 (38.1)	5.4 (41.7)	10.6 (51.1)	15.1 (59.2)	19.9 (67.8)	22.5 (72.5)	24.7 (76.5)	23.9 (75.0)	19.6 (67.3)	15.0 (59.0)	8.2 (46.8)	4.2 (39.6)	14.4 (57.9)
Daily mean °C (°F)	0.0 (32.0)	1.0 (33.8)	5.3 (41.5)	9.4 (48.9)	14.1 (57.4)	17.0 (62.6)	19.0 (66.2)	18.2 (64.8)	14.1 (57.4)	9.8 (49.6)	4.4 (39.9)	1.2 (34.2)	9.5 (49.1)
Mean daily minimum °C (°F)	−3.3 (26.1)	−2.6 (27.3)	1.2 (34.2)	4.6 (40.3)	9.1 (48.4)	12.2 (54.0)	14.2 (57.6)	13.8 (56.8)	10.2 (50.4)	6.3 (43.3)	1.2 (34.2)	−1.9 (28.6)	5.4 (41.7)
Record low °C (°F)	−22.6 (−8.7)	−17.5 (0.5)	−15.0 (5.0)	−5.0 (23.0)	−0.2 (31.6)	3.0 (37.4)	6.4 (43.5)	5.2 (41.4)	1.0 (33.8)	−6.3 (20.7)	−12.0 (10.4)	−14.6 (5.7)	−22.6 (−8.7)
Average precipitation mm (inches)	72 (2.8)	68 (2.7)	89 (3.5)	89 (3.5)	124 (4.9)	155 (6.1)	182 (7.2)	182 (7.2)	131 (5.2)	86 (3.4)	92 (3.6)	89 (3.5)	1,360 (53.5)
Average snowfall cm (inches)	20 (7.9)	21 (8.3)	10 (3.9)	2 (0.8)	0 (0)	0 (0)	0 (0)	0 (0)	0 (0)	0 (0)	8 (3.1)	19 (7.5)	79 (31)
Average relative humidity (%) (at 14:00)	74.3	66.7	57.3	53.7	55.3	57.1	58.2	60.5	63.4	66.9	73.5	76.9	63.6
Mean monthly sunshine hours	71	104	142	173	199	203	226	211	162	130	76	55	1,754
Source: Central Institute for Meteorology and Geodynamics

Climate data for Feldkirch, Vorarlberg (1971–2000)
Month	Jan	Feb	Mar	Apr	May	Jun	Jul	Aug	Sep	Oct	Nov	Dec	Year
Record high °C (°F)	19.2 (66.6)	21.2 (70.2)	25.0 (77.0)	29.8 (85.6)	31.8 (89.2)	36.5 (97.7)	38.1 (100.6)	35.4 (95.7)	32.8 (91.0)	29.7 (85.5)	25.2 (77.4)	21.8 (71.2)	38.1 (100.6)
Mean daily maximum °C (°F)	3.0 (37.4)	5.2 (41.4)	10.3 (50.5)	14.1 (57.4)	19.2 (66.6)	21.7 (71.1)	23.9 (75.0)	23.5 (74.3)	19.6 (67.3)	14.1 (57.4)	7.6 (45.7)	4.1 (39.4)	13.9 (57.0)
Daily mean °C (°F)	−0.7 (30.7)	0.7 (33.3)	4.8 (40.6)	8.4 (47.1)	13.5 (56.3)	16.3 (61.3)	18.4 (65.1)	17.9 (64.2)	13.9 (57.0)	9.0 (48.2)	3.5 (38.3)	0.5 (32.9)	8.9 (48.0)
Mean daily minimum °C (°F)	−3.4 (25.9)	−2.4 (27.7)	1.0 (33.8)	3.9 (39.0)	8.4 (47.1)	11.4 (52.5)	13.5 (56.3)	13.3 (55.9)	9.8 (49.6)	5.6 (42.1)	0.7 (33.3)	−2.1 (28.2)	5.0 (41.0)
Record low °C (°F)	−22.6 (−8.7)	−17.5 (0.5)	−17.0 (1.4)	−5.0 (23.0)	−0.6 (30.9)	3.0 (37.4)	5.4 (41.7)	5.0 (41.0)	−1.0 (30.2)	−6.3 (20.7)	−12.0 (10.4)	−21.6 (−6.9)	−22.6 (−8.7)
Average precipitation mm (inches)	68.0 (2.68)	65.3 (2.57)	72.9 (2.87)	86.6 (3.41)	106.7 (4.20)	150.5 (5.93)	165.3 (6.51)	152.1 (5.99)	113.2 (4.46)	78.0 (3.07)	92.1 (3.63)	80.3 (3.16)	1,231 (48.46)
Average snowfall cm (inches)	19.2 (7.6)	20.7 (8.1)	9.4 (3.7)	2.0 (0.8)	0.2 (0.1)	0.0 (0.0)	0.0 (0.0)	0.0 (0.0)	0.0 (0.0)	0.0 (0.0)	10.3 (4.1)	14.6 (5.7)	76.4 (30.1)
Average precipitation days (≥ 1.0 mm)	10.3	9.3	11.7	12.7	13.2	14.8	14.6	13.6	10.8	9.5	11.2	11.0	142.7
Average relative humidity (%) (at 14:00)	74.7	66.9	55.4	52.6	53.1	55.8	56.8	58.4	60.5	65.7	72.8	76.3	62.4
Mean monthly sunshine hours	60.0	95.5	134.5	159.8	193.6	191.0	215.0	207.8	165.5	115.2	72.0	51.6	1,661.5
Percentage possible sunshine	24.6	37.4	41.0	42.7	43.9	43.0	49.0	51.0	49.3	39.6	29.4	23.4	39.5
Source: Central Institute for Meteorology and Geodynamics

== Schools ==
- Bundesgymnasium und Bundesrealgymnasium Feldkirch (founded in 1649)
- Bundeshandelsakademie und Bundeshandelsschule Feldkirch
- Bundesoberstufenrealgymnasium und Bundesrealgymnasium Schillerstrasse (GYS)& Musikgymnasium Feldkirch www.gys.at
- Bundeshandelsakademie und Handelsschule Feldkirch
- Institut St. Josef
- Musikschule der Stadt Feldkirch
- Stella Matutina (Jesuit school) (former)
- University College of Teacher Education Vorarlberg (German: Pädagogische Hochschule Vorarlberg) PH Vorarlberg (in German)
- Vorarlberger Landeskonservatorium

== Notable people ==
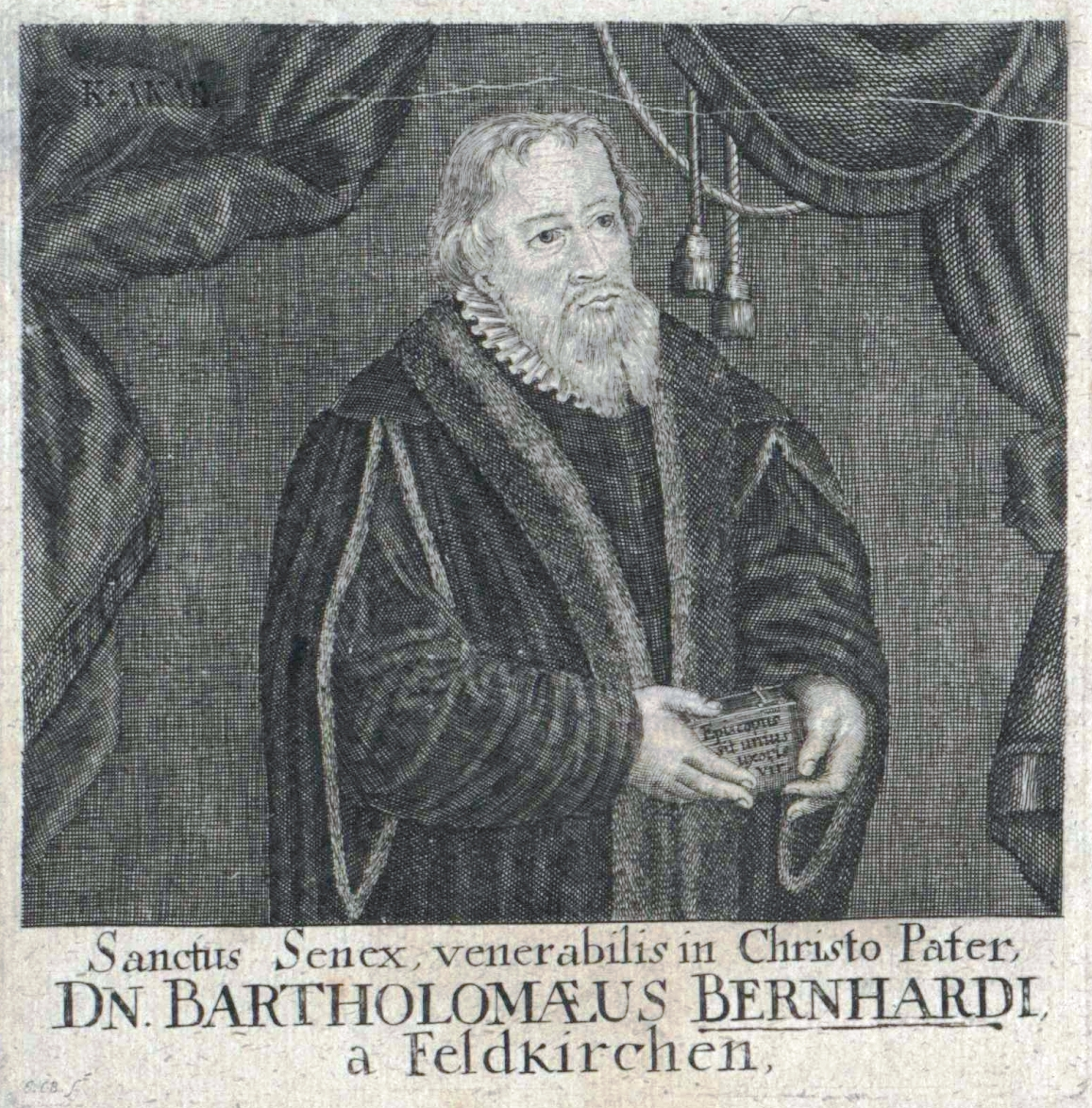
Bartholomäus Bernhardi

- Bartholomäus Bernhardi (1487–1551), Lutheran theologian
- Wolf Huber (ca.1485–1553), painter of the Danube school and architect
- Georg Joachim Rheticus (1514–1574), mathematician and astronomer.
- Barbara Erni (1743–1785), thief and confidence trickster, last person to be executed by Liechtenstein.
- Alois Handl (1837–1915), an Austrian physicist.
- Karl Bleyle (1880–1969), musician and composer
- Franz Reinisch (1903–1942), Austrian Catholic priest executed for not swearing "Hitler Oath".
- Elmar Fischer (1936–2022), bishop of the Feldkirch diocese
- Bernhard Leitner (born 1938), artist
- Georg Sporschill (born 1946), pastor known for his social engagement for orphans and street children in Romania and Moldova and work with the homeless in Vienna.
- Günther Freitag (born 1952), novelist
- Herbert Bösch (born 1954), politician (SPÖ) and MEP
- Christine Wohlwend (born 1978), Liechtensteiner politician
- Princess Gisela of Liechtenstein (born 1990), Liechtensteiner businesswoman and Vatican official
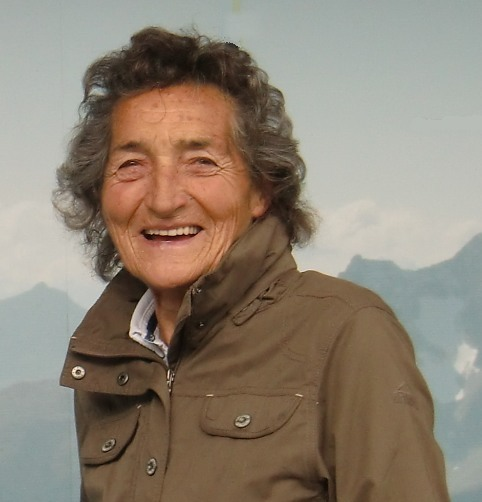
- Wiltrud Drexel, 2012
  Hans Weingartner (born 1970), author, director and film producer

=== Sport ===
- Wiltrud Drexel (born 1950), ski racer, bronze medallist in the giant slalom at the 1972 Winter Olympics
- Marcel Büchel (born 1991), a footballer with over 300 club caps and 17 for Liechtenstein
- Katharina Liensberger (born 1997), alpine ski racer, team gold medallist at the 2022 Winter Olympics
- Marco Rossi (born 2001), NHL player for the Vancouver Canucks

== Sport clubs ==
- VEU Feldkirch
- TC-ESV Feldkirch
- Tennisclub Swietelsky Blau-Weiss Feldkirch
- TSV Altenstadt
- SC Tisis
- FC Blau-Weiß Feldkirch
- Baseball- and Softballclub Feldkirch Cardinals
- Metafund Baskets Feldkirch (Basketball)
- HC Blau-Weiß Feldkirch
- Sportbillardclub Feldkirch
- Schiverein Tisis
- Volleyballclub SSK Feldkirch

== Twin towns ==
- Whitby, Ontario, Canada
- Sigmaringen, Baden-Württemberg, Germany

== See also ==
- Feldkirch Sickhouse
