= Clunia, Austria =

Ancient Roman city

Clunia is the name of an ancient Roman city that is situated in Feldkirch (Vorarlberg, Austria) and indicated on the Tabula Peutingeriana. In Roman time it is thought to have been a weigh station between Brigantium and Mediolanum (present Milan).

== Excavations ==
The first excavations were made in 1884 by Samuel Jenny. He was able to find a few structures which were later buried again. In 1998, geophysical methods (ground penetrating radar) were able to find Roman buildings covering 30,000 m^{2} (7.4 acres), proving that Clunia was the second biggest Roman settlement in Vorarlberg after Brigantium. Some minor excavations were carried out between 2005 and 2008. In 2013, excavations were resumed, and currently an area of 2,000 m^{2} (0.49 acres) is being investigated (Excavations site: 47.267498°N 9.610311°E).

== See also ==
- Lists of Roman sites
