= Feldkirch Sickhouse =

Building in Feldkirch, Austria

Coordinates: 47.249945°N 9.612752°E

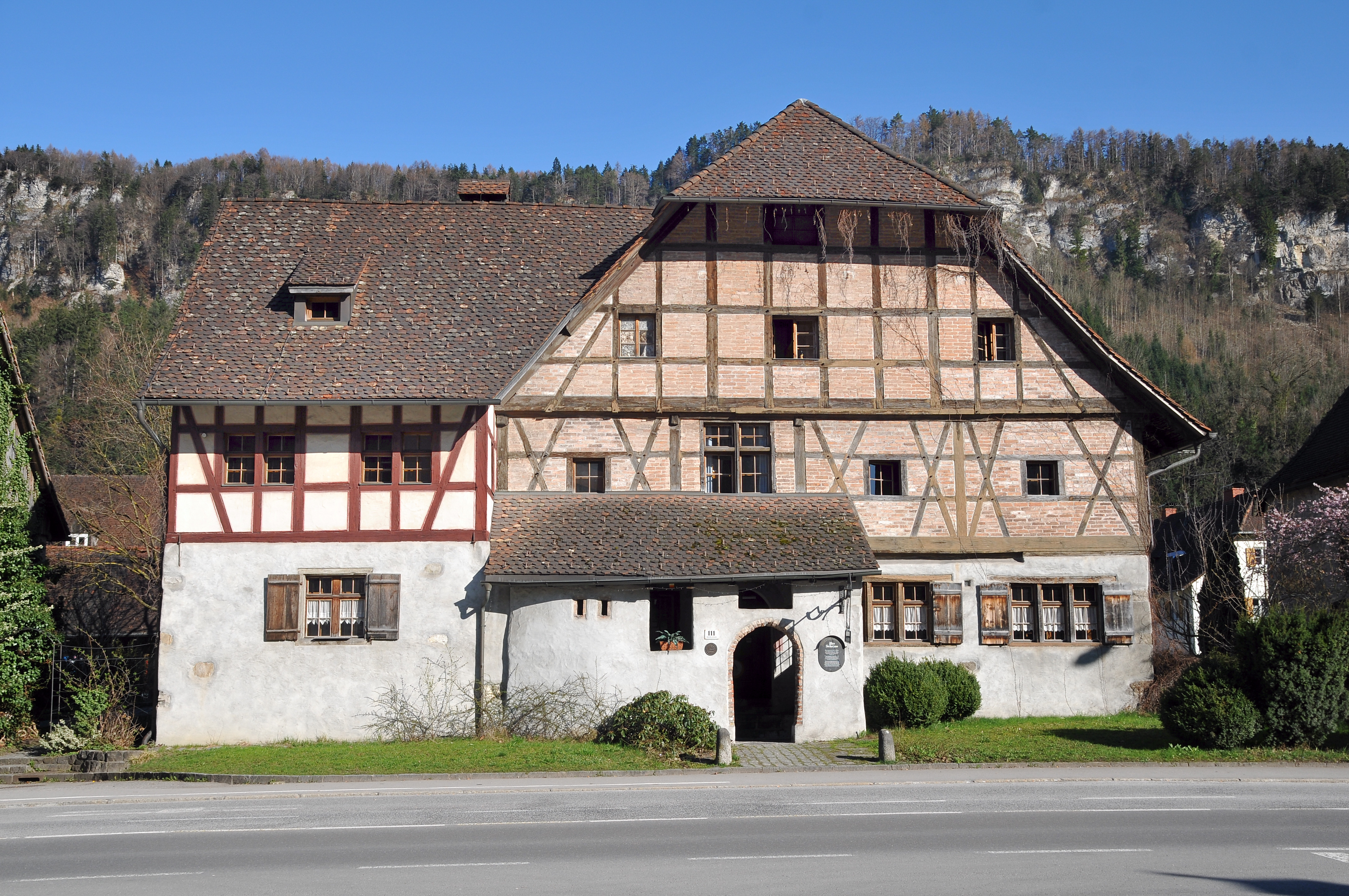
Main building

Feldkirch Sickhouse (Siechenhaus), Feldkirch, Vorarlberg, Austria, is listed an Austrian monument of cultural significance. The group of two buildings was erected in the late 16th or early 17th century. Far outside the city of Feldkirch a leper house was founded in the 14th century. The former building might be destroyed in the year 1557. Since April 1985 a youth hostel is located in main building. The outhouse is now a shelter for the bus stop and the entrance for an underpass of the Reichsstraße.

== Place ==
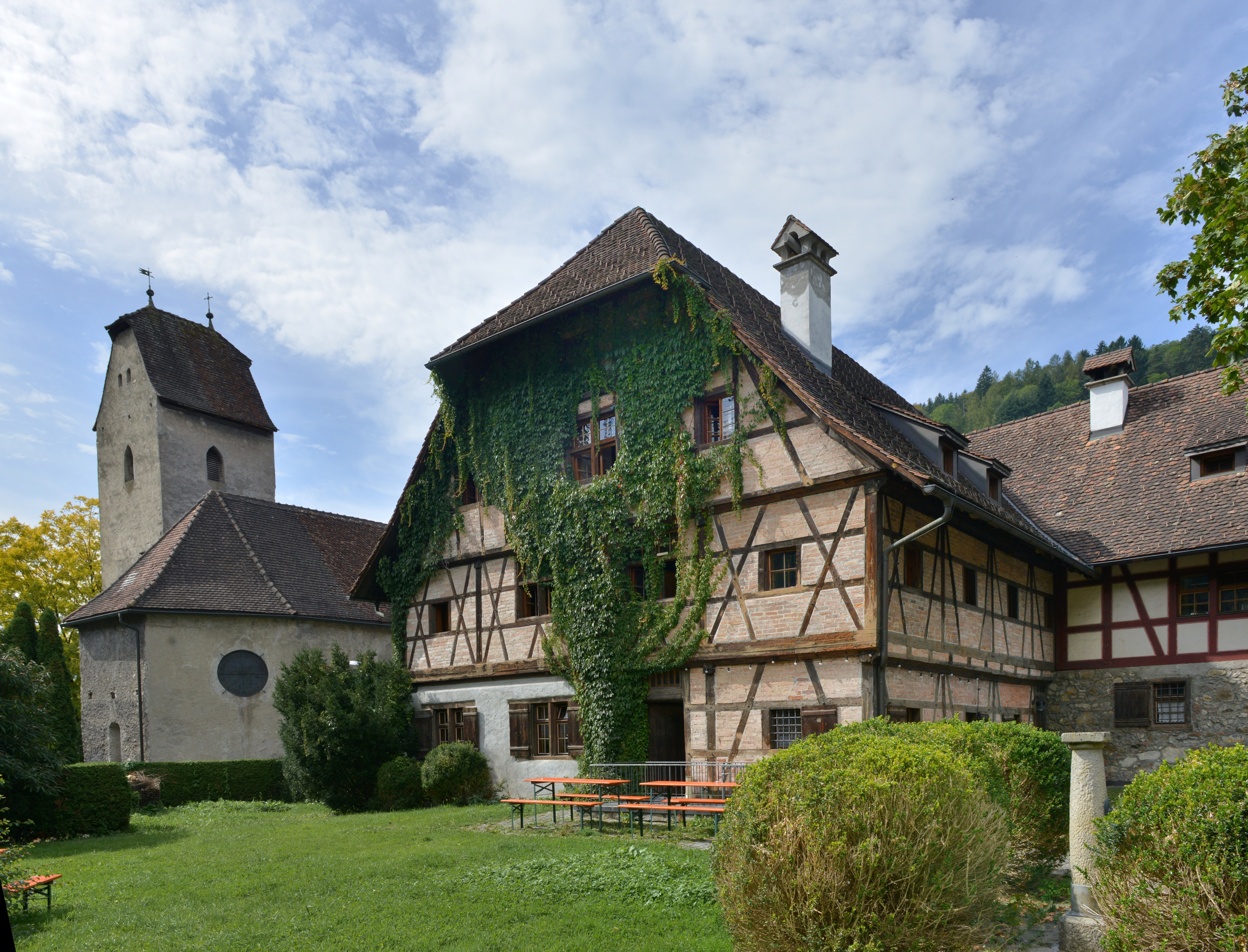
Church and main building (back side)

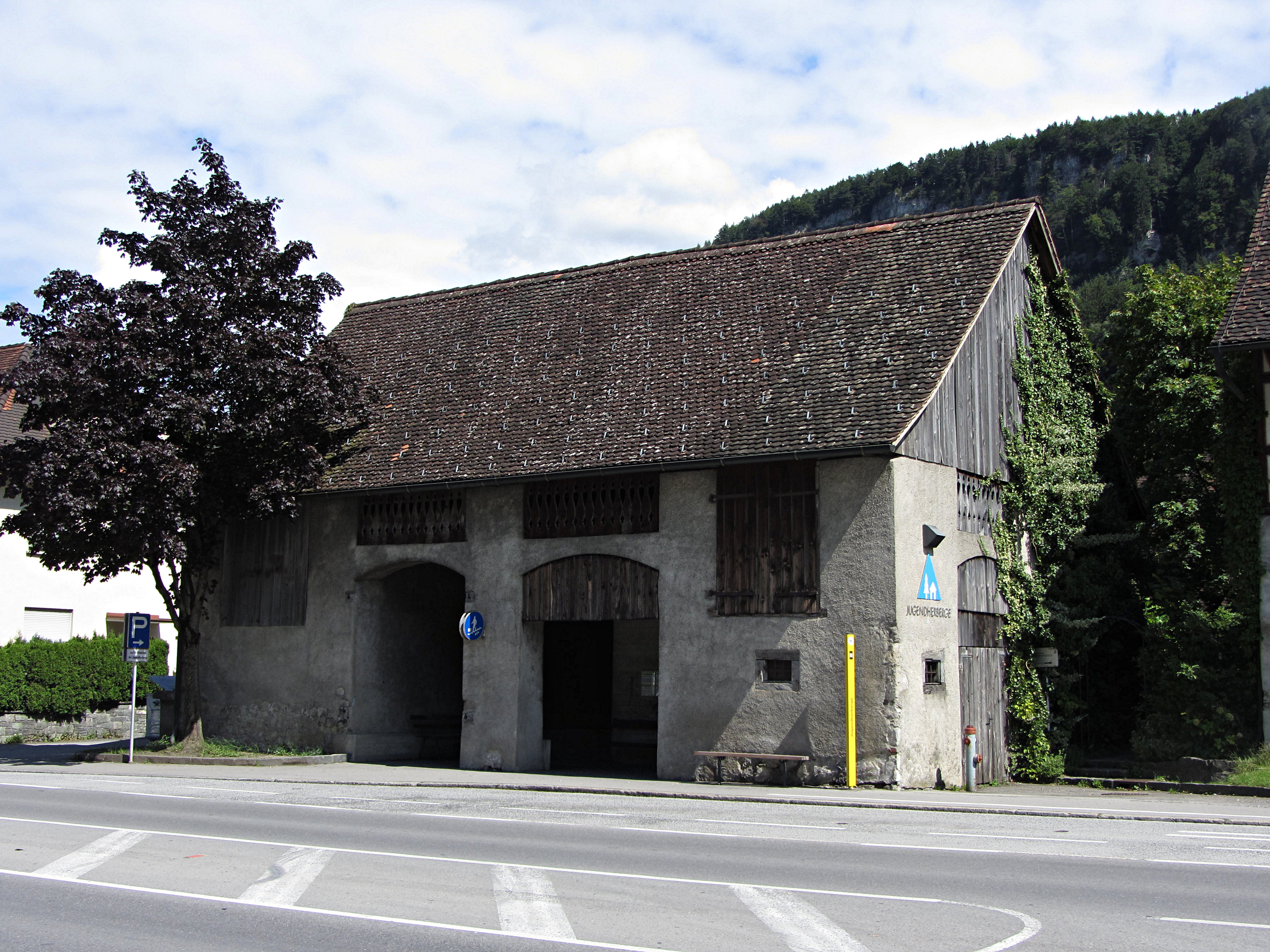
Outhouse with bus stop

The buildings are located at the Reichsstraße leading to Dornbirn. The place belongs to the district of Levis in the cadastral community Altenstadt. In the south, the neighboring building next to the main building is the Catholic Church of St. Magdalena.

== History ==
The Sickhouse was first built in the 14th century as a leprosy house far outside the then city of Feldkirch. The Magdalenenkirche next to the infirmary also dates back to the same century. It is reported that the Magdalenen church suffered severe damage in a fire in 1557. The Sickhouse might be damaged or destroyed in the same fire. The leprosy house was rebuilt in the late 16th or early 17th century. At this time the oldest parts of today's building are dated. The building was probably extended in the 17th century by an extension to the east and an annex on the north side. The timber-framed facade it is an exceptional piece of architecture. Timber-framed houses only appear in Vorarlberg,

The building was used for a short time as an emergency shelter for education, after the Feldkirch high school was damaged in a major fire on 6 August 1697. The maintenance of the Sickhouse was supported by meadows and fields in the vicinity of the building. In 1847, they were sold to a local manufacturer.

In the 20th century, the house served as accommodation for impoverished families. Since April 13, 1985 a youth hostel had been opened, said to be one of the finest in Vorarlberg. The outhouse was converted to a shelter for the bus stop. An underpass is leading to the other side of the Reichsstraße, where a modern bus stop was built using glass and concrete. located in front and the entrance for an underpass on the other side of the Reichsstraße.

== See also ==
- Homberg (Efze), Sondersiechenhaus St. Wendelin
