= Potentiale Feldkirch =

POTENTIALe Feldkirch
- Status: Active
- Genre: Contemporary Art
- Frequency: Annually
- Venue: Montforthaus Feldkirch
- Locations: Feldkirch, Vorarlberg, Austria
- Country: Austria
- Inaugurated: 2007; 19 years ago
- Next event: October/November 2026
- Attendance: 9,200
- Organizer: Maya Kleber
- Website: https://www.potentiale.at/

The POTENTIALe Messe & Festival is an arts fair and festival in Feldkirch in the Austrian province of Vorarlberg. It was first held in 2007.

At the fair and festival, about 110 exhibitors present their products and ideas on an exhibition space of 3.373 m^{2}. In addition to a vintage market, there are workshops and discussion groups, a 'design laboratory', photography exhibitions, as well as the presentation of music and films.

The POTENTIALe aims at being an interdisciplinary sales platform in order to create an ideal platform for the protagonists in different locations for the marketing and distribution of their works and products and to enable the establishment of a diverse network of contacts. It furthermore wishes to represent the close relationship between the product and the designer, focussing on with sustainable production chains, materials and products that were deliberately chosen in a fair process.

== History ==
The POTENTIALe was initially founded in 2007 under the name of Artdesign Feldkirch and was an annual fair for the sale of crafts and design products. Since then, the Artdesign/POTENTIALe office does not only organise the fair and festival but also helps shaping the urban development of the city of Feldkirch.
