= Karl Bleyle =

Austrian composer

Karl Bleyle (7 May 1880 – 5 June 1969) was an Austrian composer and musician, who also lived and worked in Germany.

== Life ==
Bleyle was born in Feldkirch, Vorarlberg. In the parental home of the young Karl - his father was the textile manufacturer Bleyle - music was played diligently and the joy of music was awakened in him at an early age. He received his first music lessons on the violin from the Feldkirch music director Karl Linke, who came from Barthfeld in Hungary and was appointed teacher at the newly established music school in Feldkirch in 1888. Karl moved to Stuttgart with his parents at the age of nine. At the conservatory there, he had his first lessons in music theory and counterpoint with Hugo Wehrle and Samuel de Lange from 1894 to 1897 and from 1897 to 1899 with Edmund Singer. After his military service, he studied music from 1904 to 1907 with Ludwig Thuille in Munich, where he lived as a composer until 1919.

Already in his first year of study in Munich Bleyle composed his 1st Symphony in C minor, which was premiered by the Hofkapelle in Stuttgart on 7 December 1905 and was highly praised by the press. On 25 February 1910 the Munich concertmaster Bruno Ahner played his Violin Concerto in C major op. 10 at the concert of the Musikalische Akademie. After fruitful compositional years in Cannstatt (1919-1923) and Stuttgart he moved to Graz (Austria), where his first opera The Devil's Bridge, a Requiem and the Trilogy of Passion were created. Another station in his life was the National Theatre Weimar, whose musical direction he held for two years. After a short stay in Bled he moved back to Stuttgart, where he worked until his death at the age of 89.

He never gave up his Austrian citizenship out of solidarity with his native town of Feldkirch.

== Compositions ==
- Sinfonie Nr. 1 in c-Moll (1904/05)
- Sinfonie Nr. 2 in F-Dur, op. 6 (1906)
- Flagellantenzug, op. 9 – Sinfonische Dichtung (1907)
- Konzert für Violine und Orchester in C-Dur, op. 10 (1908)
- Gnomentanz (1909)
- Höllenfahrt Christi (1910)
- Chorus mysticus (1910)
- Ein Harfenklang (1910)
- Prometheus (1912)
- Trilogie der Leidschaft
- Requiem
- Der Teufelssteg – Oper
- Der Hochzeiter – Oper
- Ouvertüre zu Goethes Reineke Fuchs, op. 23 (1914)
- Sonate für Violine und Klavier, G-Dur, op. 38 (1923)
- Konzert für Violoncello und Orchester in d-Moll, op. 49 (1934)
- Minnelieder nach Heinrich von Morungen, op. 44 (1936)
- Schneewittchen-Suite, op. 50
- Bacchanten-Ouverture, op 52 (1937)
- Sonate für Violine und Klavier in e-Moll, op. 56 (1943)
