= Montforthaus Feldkirch =

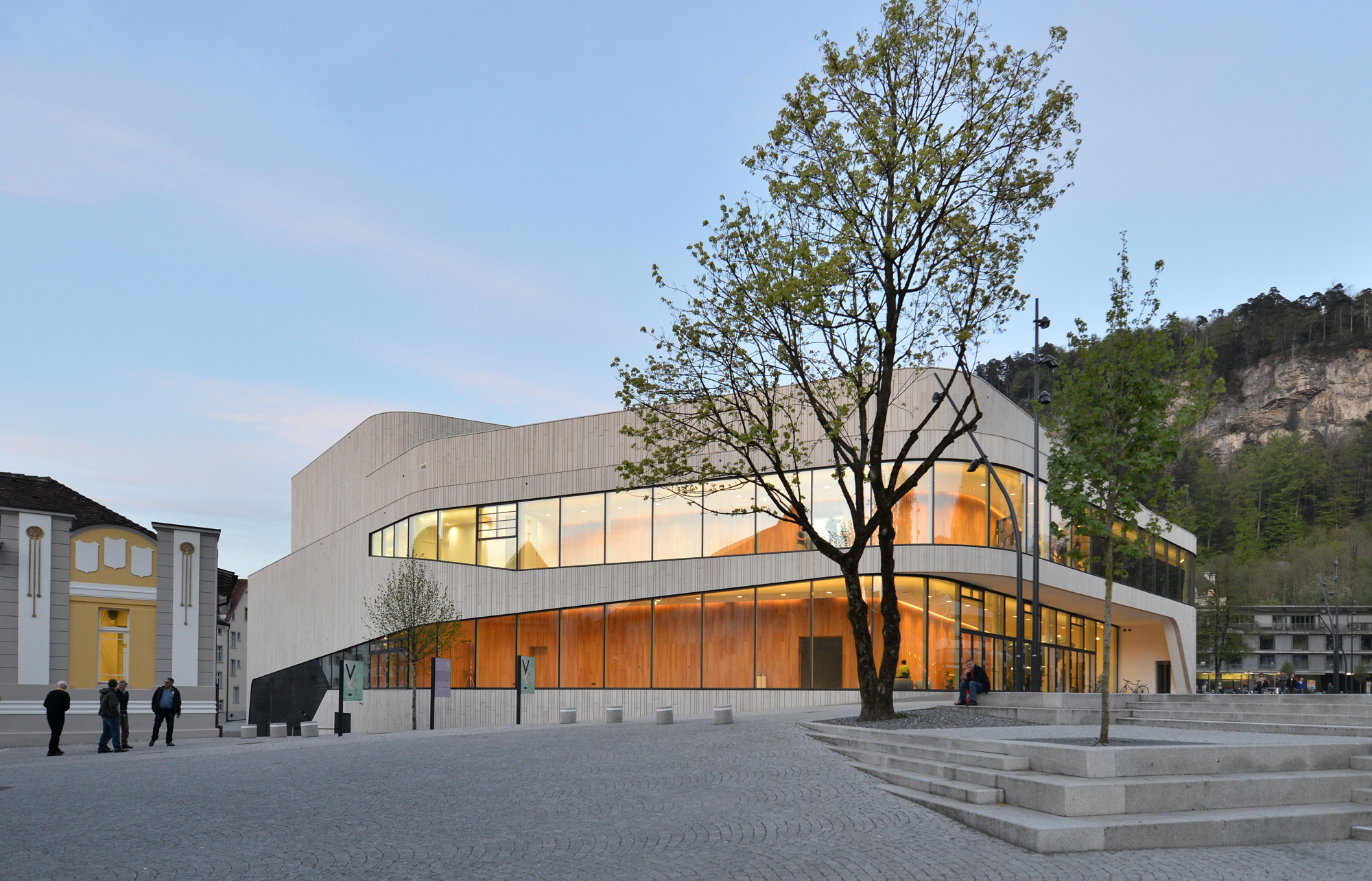
- Interactive map of the Montforthaus Feldkirch area

General information
- Status: music venue, congress centre, social centre
- Location: Montfortplatz 1, 6800 Feldkirch, Feldkirch, Vorarlberg, Austria
- Coordinates: 47.2360°N 9.5978°E
- Renovated: 2010–2015
- Owner: City of Feldkirch
- Management: Montforthaus Feldkirch GmbH

Other information
- Seating capacity: 1,100–3,000 people (big hall), 270 people (small hall)

Website
- www.montforthausfeldkirch.com

The Montforthaus Feldkirch is a multi-purpose cultural centre in Feldkirch, Vorarlberg (Austria). It is used for conventions, balls, trade fairs, concerts and theatre performances.

== History ==
The Feldkirch "Volkshalle" was built in 1926 by the architect Lois Welzenbacher in view of the Vorarlberg trade exhibition a year later. This architecturally particularly valuable building was located at the current location of the Montforthaus until 1973.

On the night of 6–7 July 1973, the entire building burned down to the foundation walls after a ball lightning strike.

The city council of Feldkirch therefore decided to rebuild or renovate the building, after which it was reopened in 1975 under the name "Stadthalle". The building underwent another conversion and a change of name in 1990, when it received an extension and was given the name "Montforthaus".

On 3 July 2007 the Feldkirch town council decided unanimously that the Montforthaus should be rebuilt. As part of an international architecture competition, the Berlin office Hascher Jehle Architektur in cooperation with the Bludenz architecture office Mitiska Wäger were selected as the architects. On 29 June 2010 the planning decision was made and the plans were awarded to the competition winners. The actual construction decision was made on 9 October 2012, by the city council. Demolition work on the old Montforthaus was carried out from October to December 2012.

The foundation stone for the new building was laid in April 2013, the topping-out ceremony was celebrated on 8 November that year and construction was completed in November 2014. The new building was officially opened on 2 January 2015, in the presence of Governor Markus Wallner and Mayor Wilfried Berchtold.

== Architecture ==
The architects are Hascher Jehle Architektur (Berlin) together in a working group with Mitiska Wäger Architekten (Bludenz). The structural consultant was Bernard & Brunnsteiner (Hall), the acoustic planning was done by Graner + Partner and the light planning by LDE.

The big hall ("Großer Saal") accommodates between 1,100 and 3,000 people. The lounge is 15 m high and covers an area of 1,800 m^{2}. The glass and window surfaces take up 1,200 m^{2}. The small hall ("Kleiner Saal") accommodates up to 270 people. Moreover, there are four seminar rooms for 60 to 100 people, a restaurant and 60 more seats on the roof deck, an additional event room seating 150 people and an underground car park fitting 138 cars and 30 bikes.

=== Exterior ===
The Montforthaus is embedded in the medieval old town of Feldkirch. While its formal articulation is demonstratively modern, its materiality picks up the traditional Jura marble of the region.

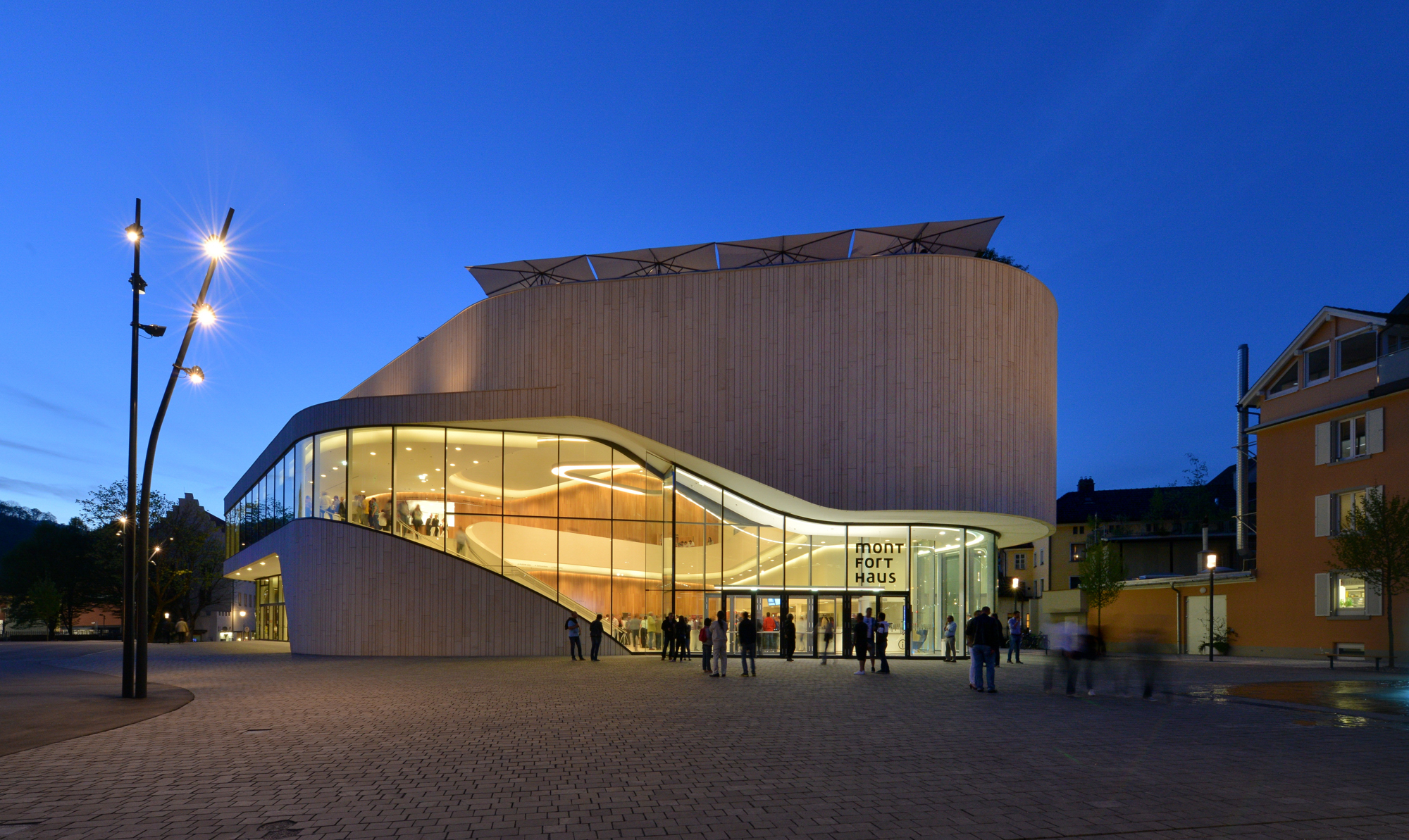

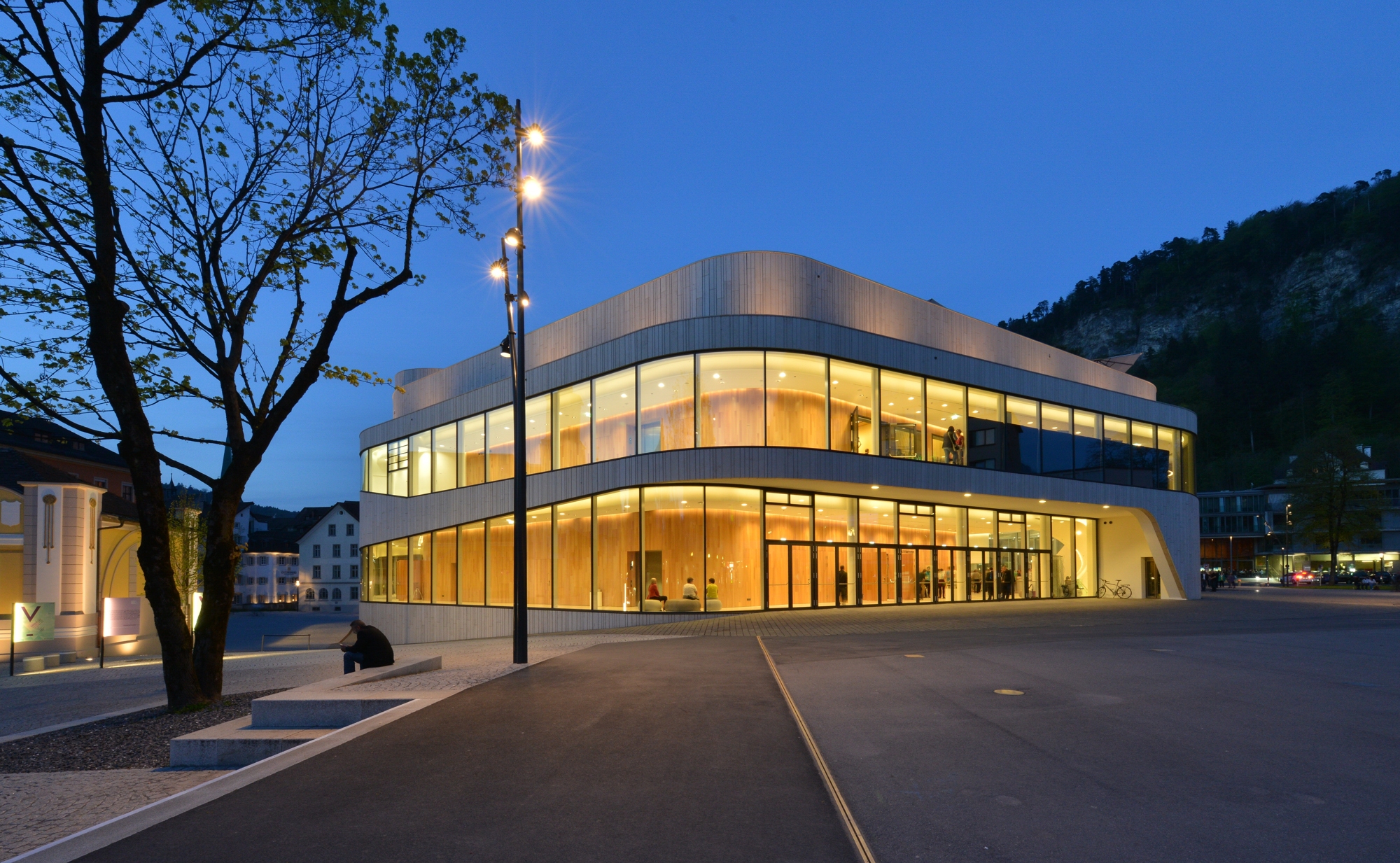

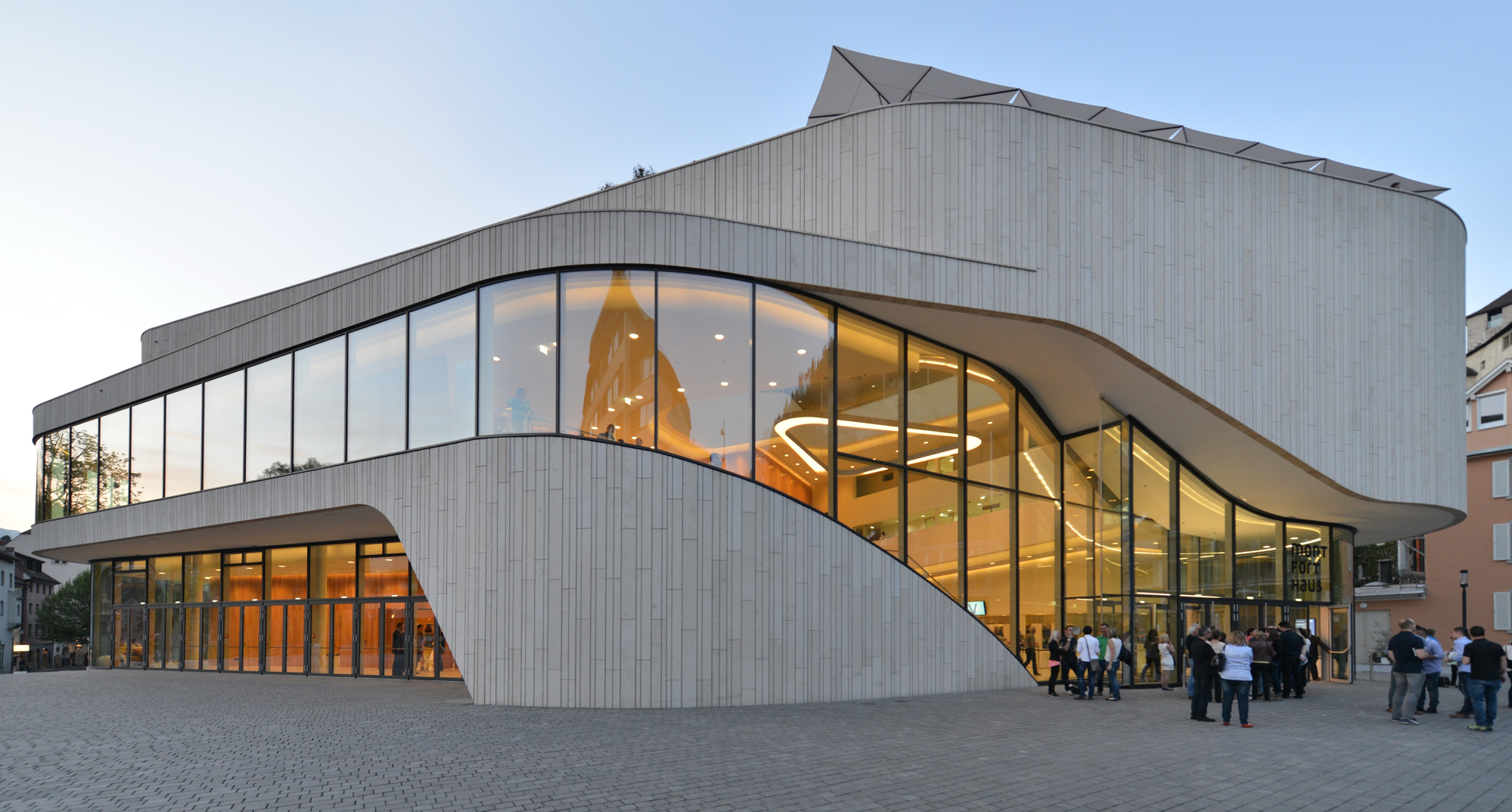

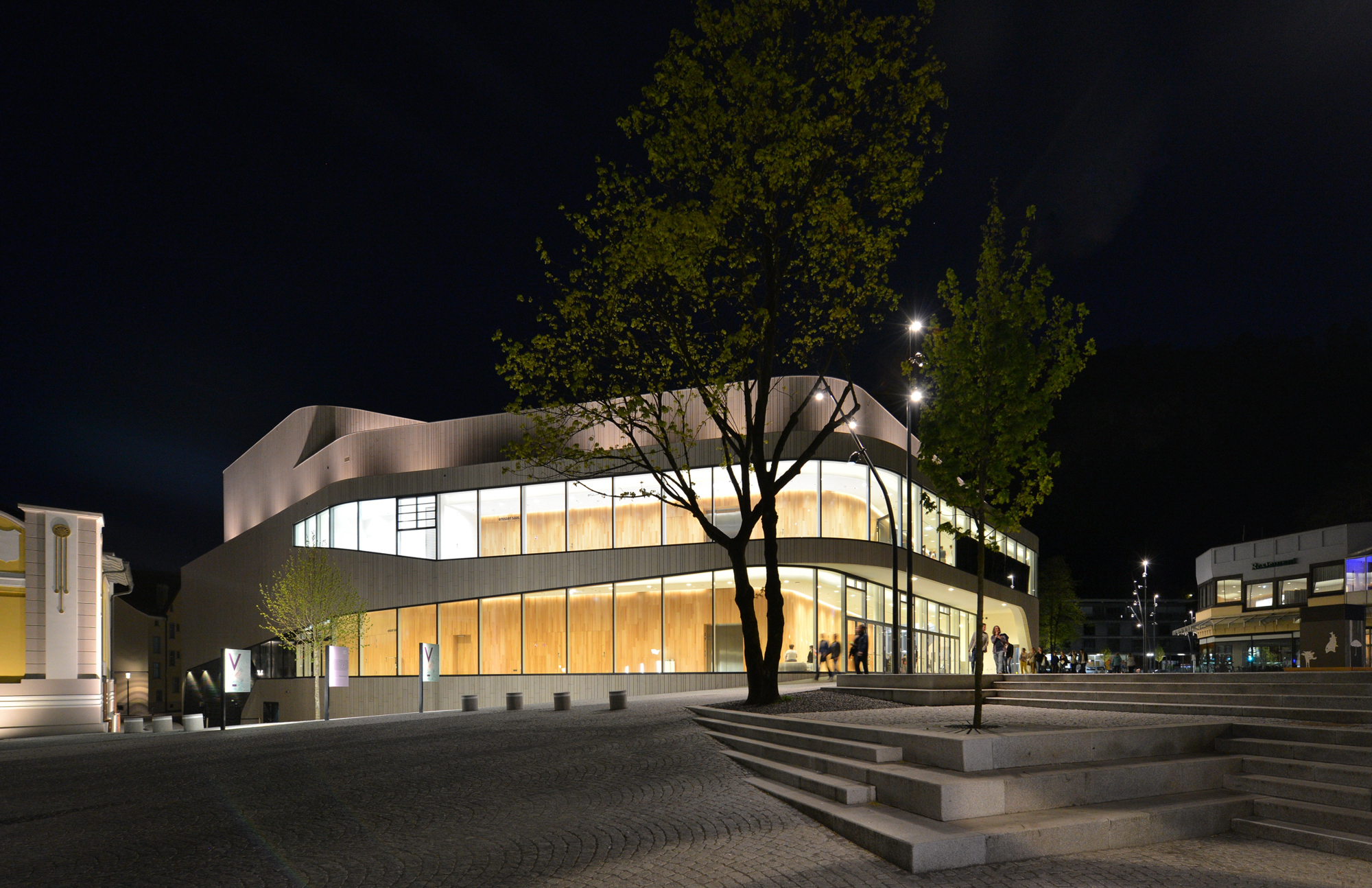

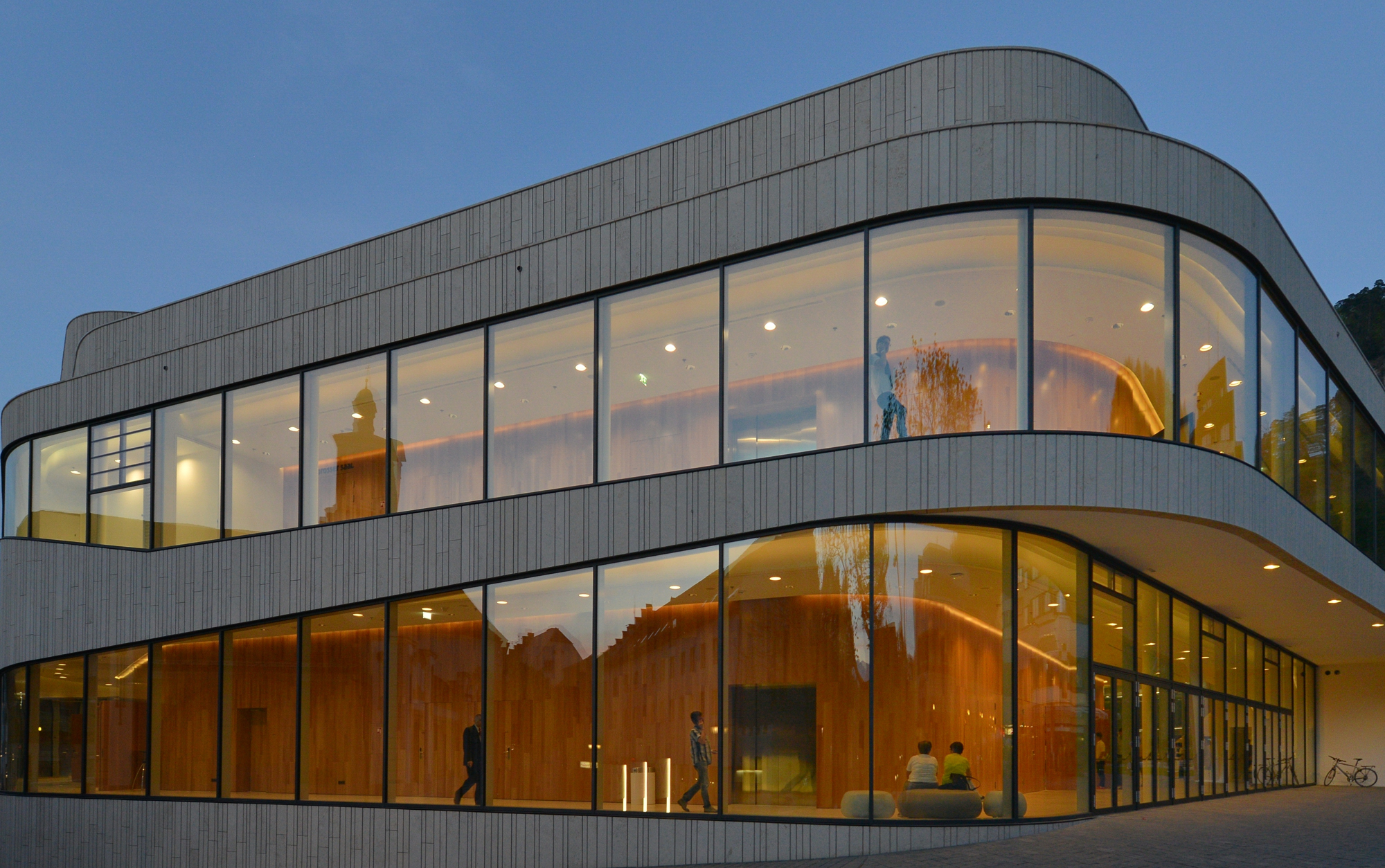

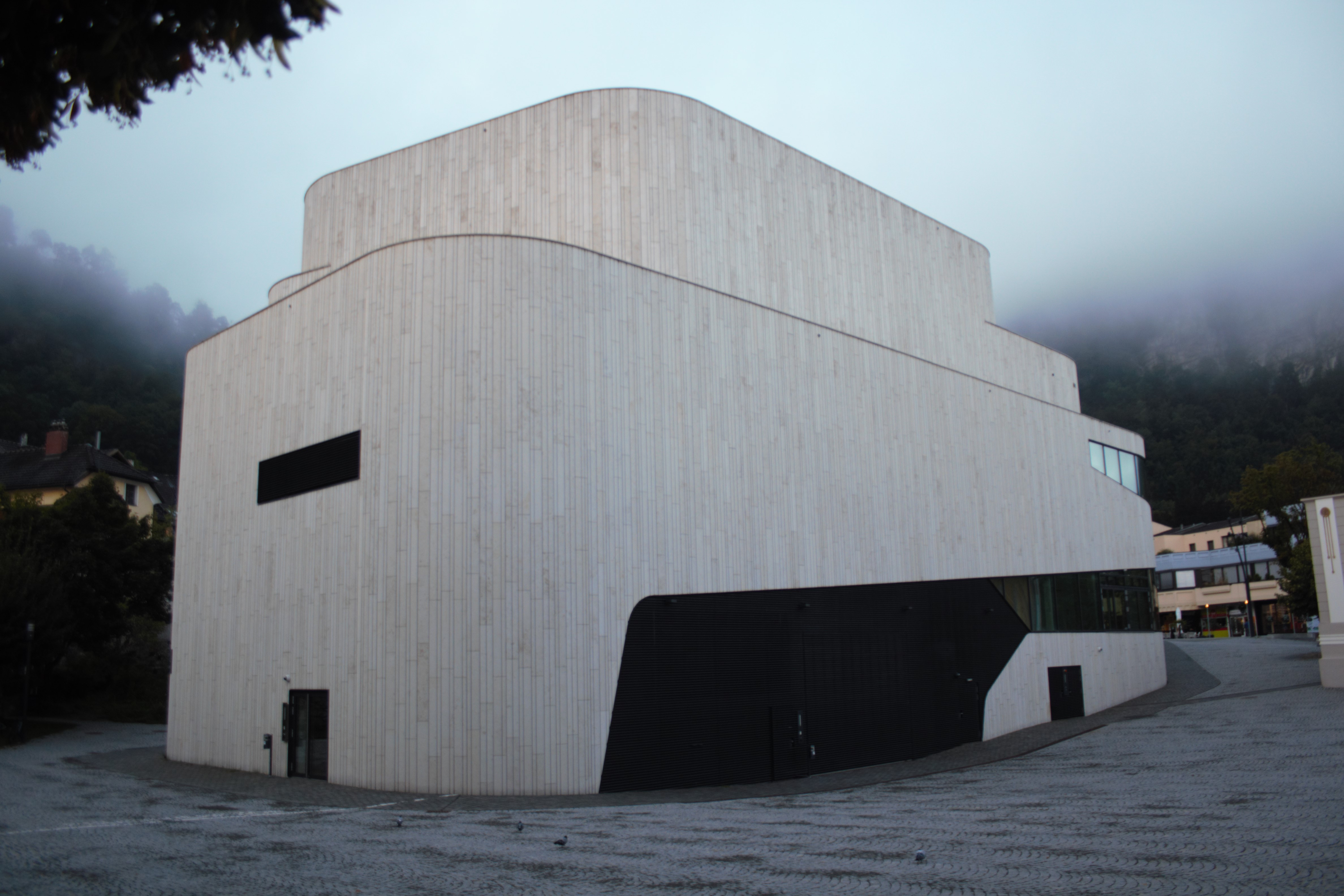

=== Interior ===
The new public building provides a total of 12,700 m^{2} of gross floor area. The core functional elements of the building are distributed directly around the foyer and can be joined or separated as required.

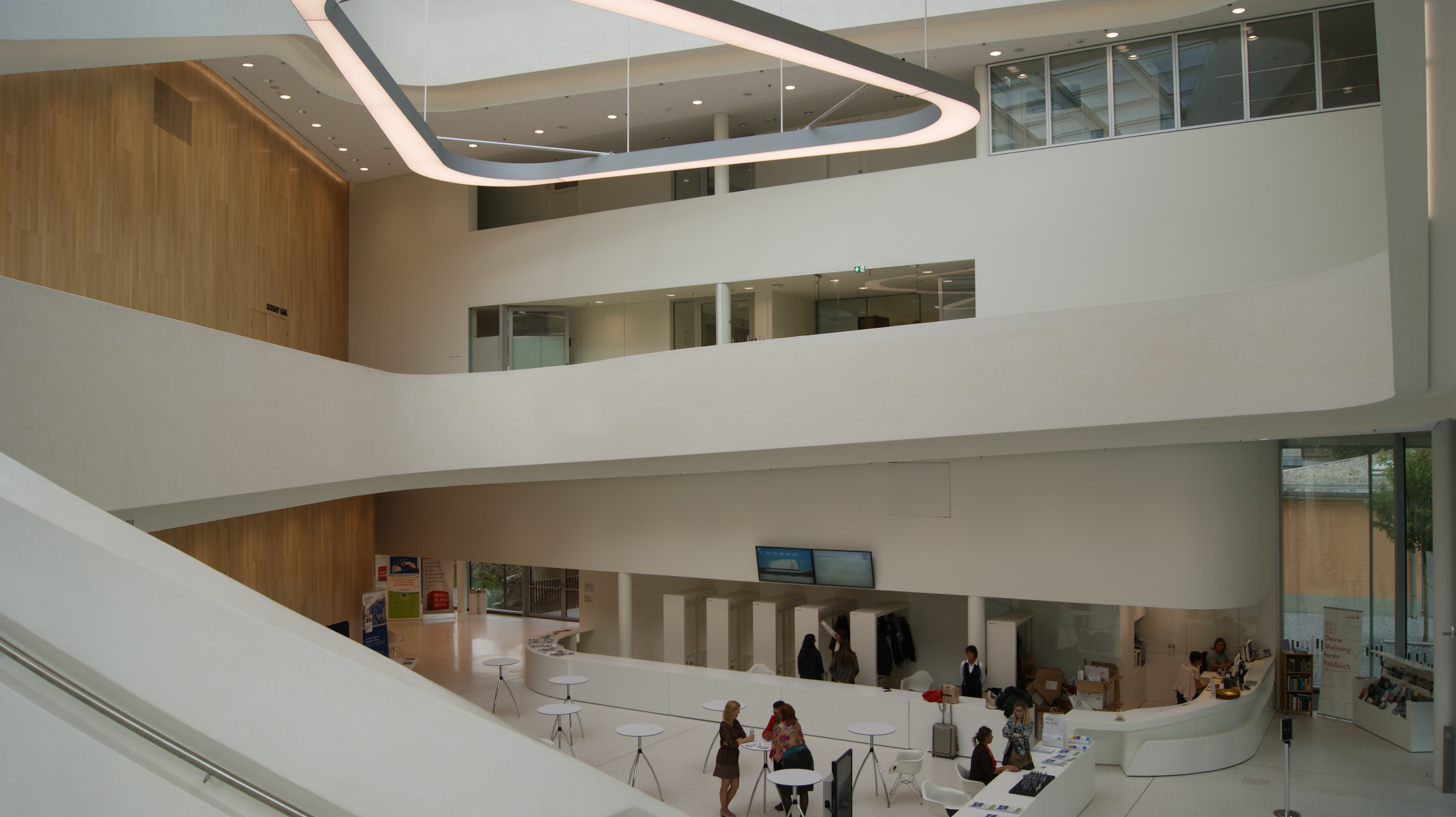
The lounge

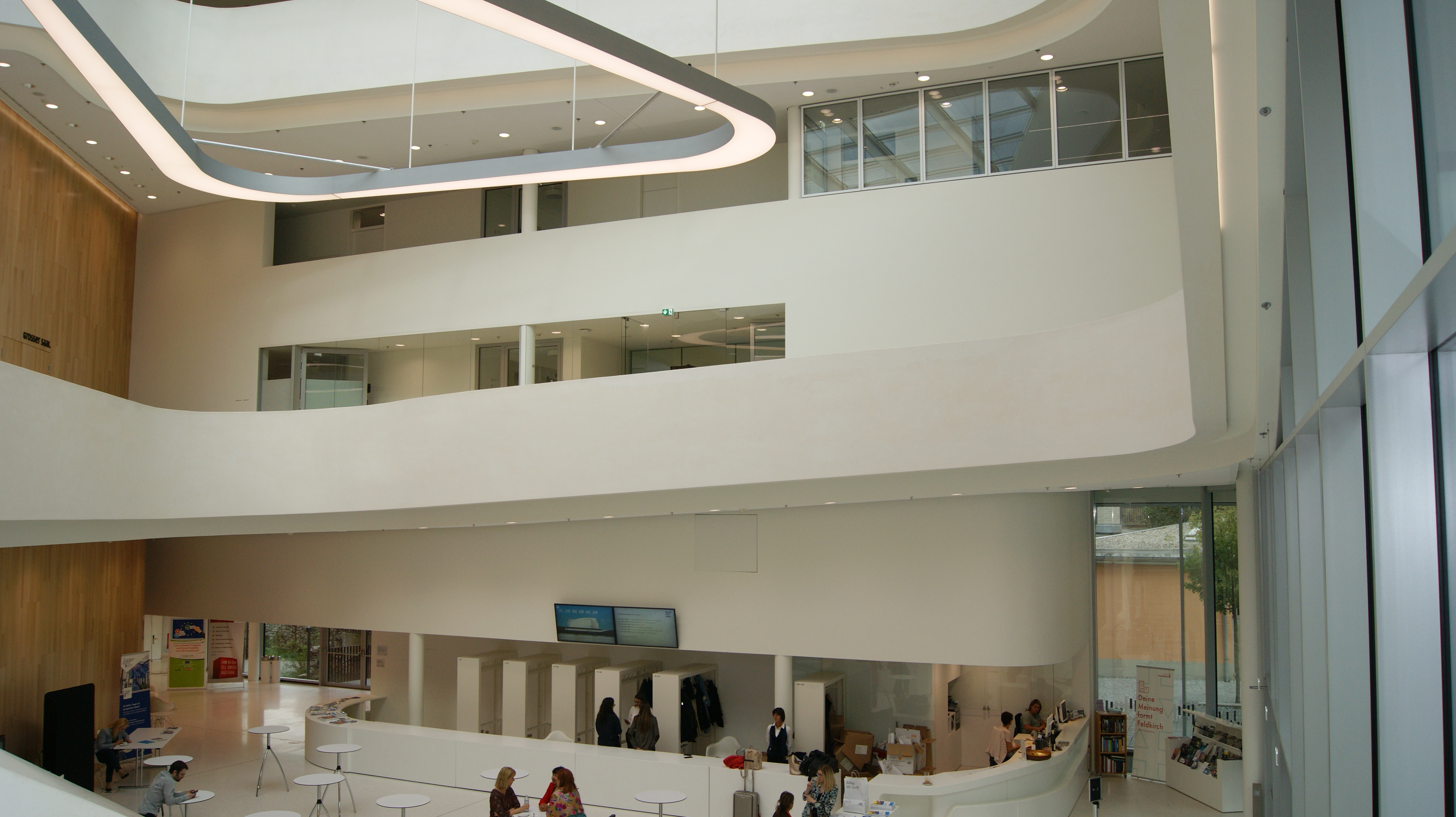
The lounge

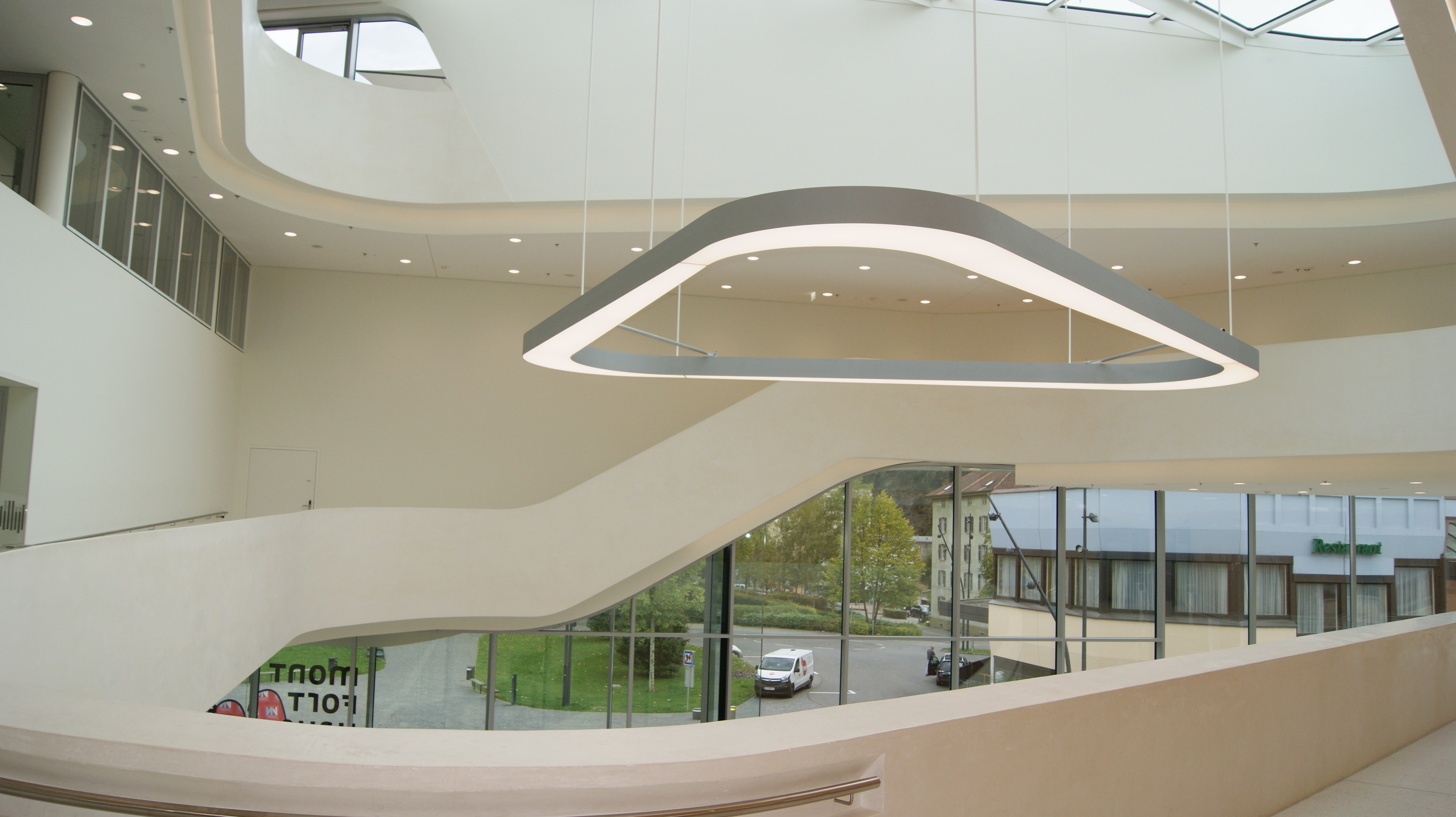
Lamp in the lounge

== Awards ==
The Montforthaus Feldkirch won the following awards:

- Austrian national prize for architecture and sustainability 2017
- German lighting design award 2017
- ICONIC AWARDS 2016
- PILGRAM 2016 – Award for architecture and natural stone
- 7th Vorarlberger Hypo builder award 2015
- Austrian national prize DESIGN 2015 (finale)
- klimaktiv Gold for sustainability

== See also ==
- Montforter Zwischentöne
