= Bartholomäus Bernhardi of Feldkirchen =

Professor of physics and philosophy (1487-1551)

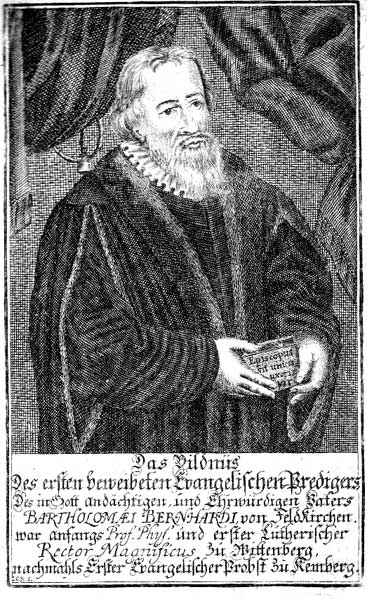
Bartholomäus Bernhardi of Feldkirchen.

Bartholomäus Bernardi (1487–1551) was the rector and a professor of physics and philosophy at the University of Wittenberg during the time of Martin Luther. He was a student of Luther's.

He was born in Schlins in Vorarlberg (Austria) and studied at Erfurt in Germany.

He became a Protestant reformer. He was pastor of the congregation in Kemberg, Saxony (15.2 kilometers (9.4 miles) south of Wittenberg). He was the first Lutheran provost in Kemberg.

He was the third Lutheran priest to marry (after Jacob Knabe of Danzig and Nicholas Brunner of Nesselbach).

After his marriage, the Archbishop of Magdeburg, Elector Albrecht of Mainz, demanded that the Elector of Saxony, Frederick the Wise, extradite Bernardi to the ecclesiastical court; the Elector refused to do so.
