= Poolbar Festival =

Austrian music festival

- Genre: music, film, literature, fashion, cabaret
- Dates: annually in July and August
- Locations: Feldkirch, Vorarlberg (Austria)
- Years active: 1994 – present
- Website: https://www.poolbar.at/

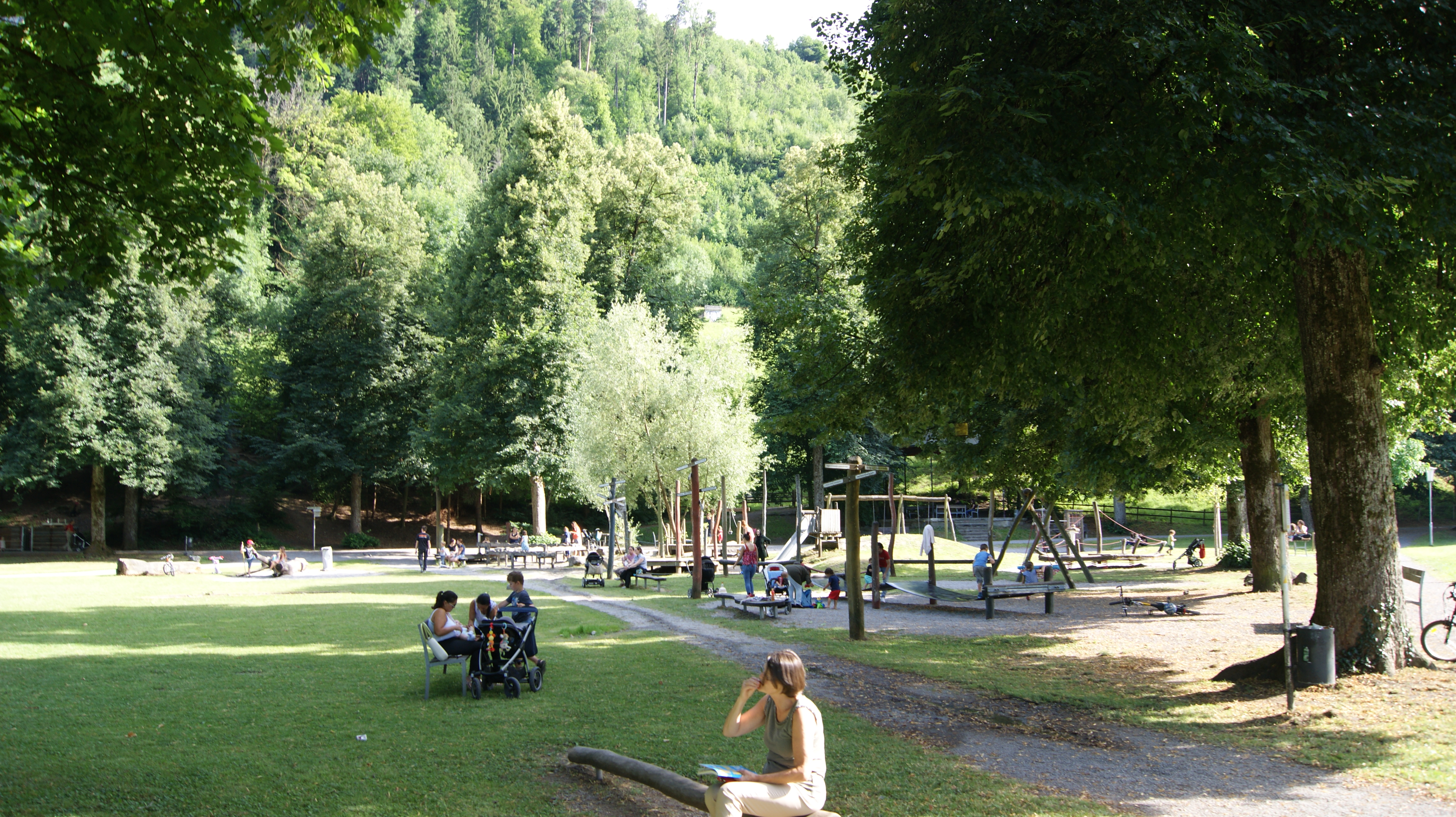
The Reichenfeld park in the city center of Feldkirch is one of the locations of the Poolbar Festival

The Poolbar Festival is an annual music and culture festival in the city of Feldkirch in the Austrian province of Vorarlberg. Between 20,000 and 25,000 visitors attend the festival each year.

== The festival ==
It was first held in 1994 as a cultural summer-academy and is through organization and implementation of landscape and architecture very different to other open-air events.

Placed at the geographical interface between Austria, Germany, Liechtenstein and Switzerland, the "Altes Hallenbad" in Feldkirch becomes a cross-border hotspot every summer, when the poolbar festival opens its doors to all its visitors, cultural disputes and events for several weeks during July and August. In addition to concerts and parties, the festival offers for six weeks a broad variety of cinema and short films, cabaret, poetry slam, pop quiz, fashion performances and discussions.

The festival takes place in the city center in the former indoor pool (Altes Hallenbad) of the private school Stella Matutina in the Reichenfeld park. The furniture, which is renewed every summer, is determined by an international architecture competition. The competition is organized by the Vorarlberger Architekturinstitut (VAI; Institute of Vorarlberg Architecture) as well as the local Chamber of Commerce. Art and fashion competitions are also held at the festival.

Despite the COVID-19-pandemic, 10,000 visitors were able to attend the festival in 2020.

Since 2020, the Poolbar Festival has been awarding the Vorarlberg Music Prize "Sound@V" together with ORF Vorarlberg and Wann&Wo. This is endowed with 20,000 euros in prize money.

== Awards ==
- 2013: Culture award of the City of Feldkirch ("Kulturpreis der Stadt Feldkirch")
- 2014: Austrian culture award for cultural initiatives ("Österreichischer Kunstpreis für Kulturinitiativen")

== Line-ups ==
Line-ups of past festival years (not complete):

- 2023: Gentleman, Danger Dan, Xavier Rudd, Digitalism (band), Heaven Shall Burn, Kruder & Dorfmeister, Russian Circles
- 2022: Sportfreunde Stiller, Metronomy, Local Natives, Kytes, HVOB, 5/8erl in Ehr'n, Alicia Edelweiss, My Ugly Clementine, Wolf Haas, Alfred Dorfer
- 2021: The Notwist, Cari Cari, Sharktank, Mighty Oaks, Patrice
- 2020: Lou Asril, Nneka, Buntspecht
- 2019: Bilderbuch, Xavier Rudd, Mattiel, The Twilight Sad, Tove Lo, Propaghandi
- 2018: Eels, Ziggy Marley, Shout Out Louds, The Subways, Seasick Steve
- 2017: Pixies, Jake Bugg, Sohn, The Naked And Famous, HVOB, Leyya, Conor Oberst
- 2016: Nada Surf, Travis, Dispatch, Peaches, Lola Marsh, Bilderbuch
- 2015: Patrice, Wanda, William Fitzsimmons, Elektro Guzzi, Dillon, Darwin Deez, Colour Haze
- 2014: Shout Out Louds, Bonaparte, The Dandy Warhols, Anna Calvi, Maximo Park
- 2013: My Bloody Valentine, Frank Turner, Young Rebel Set, Casper, Bad Religion, Kate Nash
- 2012: Marilyn Manson, Regina Spektor, Yann Tiersen, Theophilus London, The Whitest Boy Alive, Gogol Bordello
- 2011: Portugal The Man, The Subways, Molotov, Kettcar, dEUS, Hercules & Love Affair
- 2010: Nada Surf, Juliette Lewis, Flogging Molly, Ebony Bones, Die Goldenen Zitronen
- 2009: Dropkick Murphys, Anti-Flag, Morcheeba, Art Brut
- 2008: The Wombats, The Notwist, Friska Viljor, Modeselektor, Iron and Wine
- 2007: Shout Out Louds, Kosheen, Final Fantasy, Slut, IAMX
- 2006: Calexico, Vendetta, Trail of Dead, Attwenger, Eagle*Seagull
