= Portuguese Riviera =

Coastal region west of Lisbon in Portugal

Portuguese Riviera Riviera Portuguesa
- Riviera
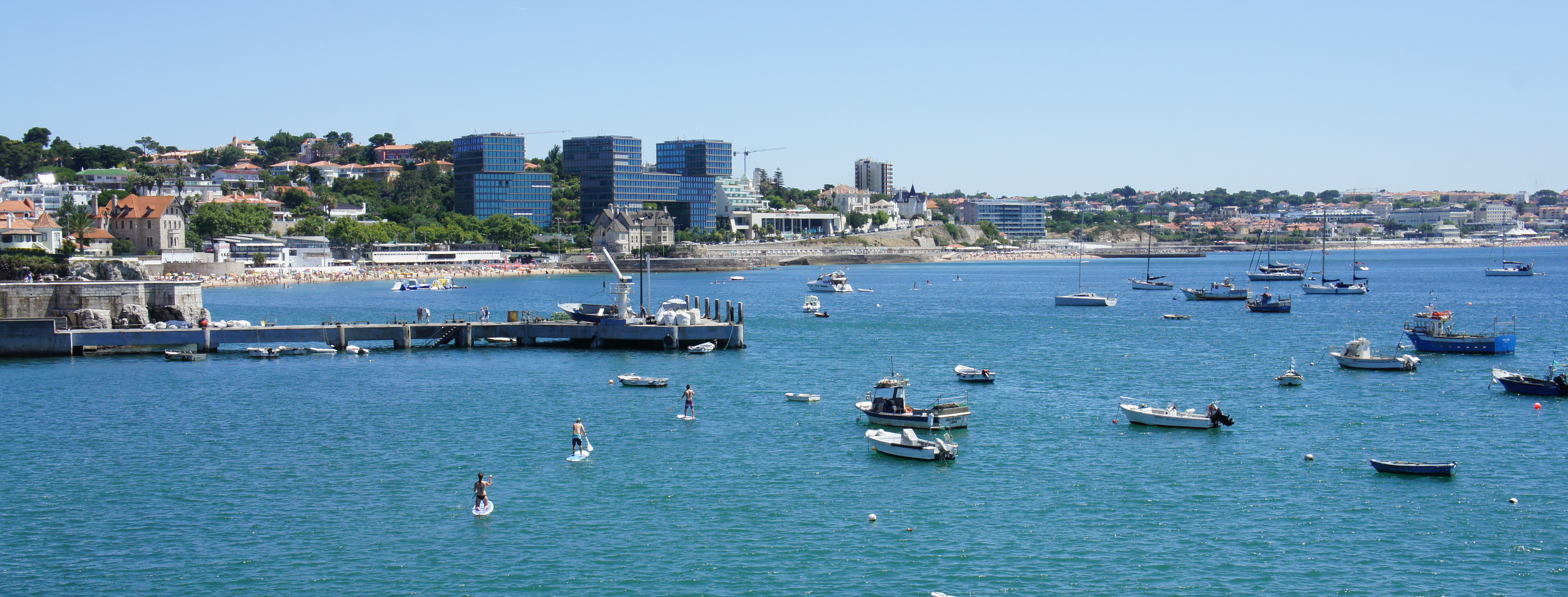
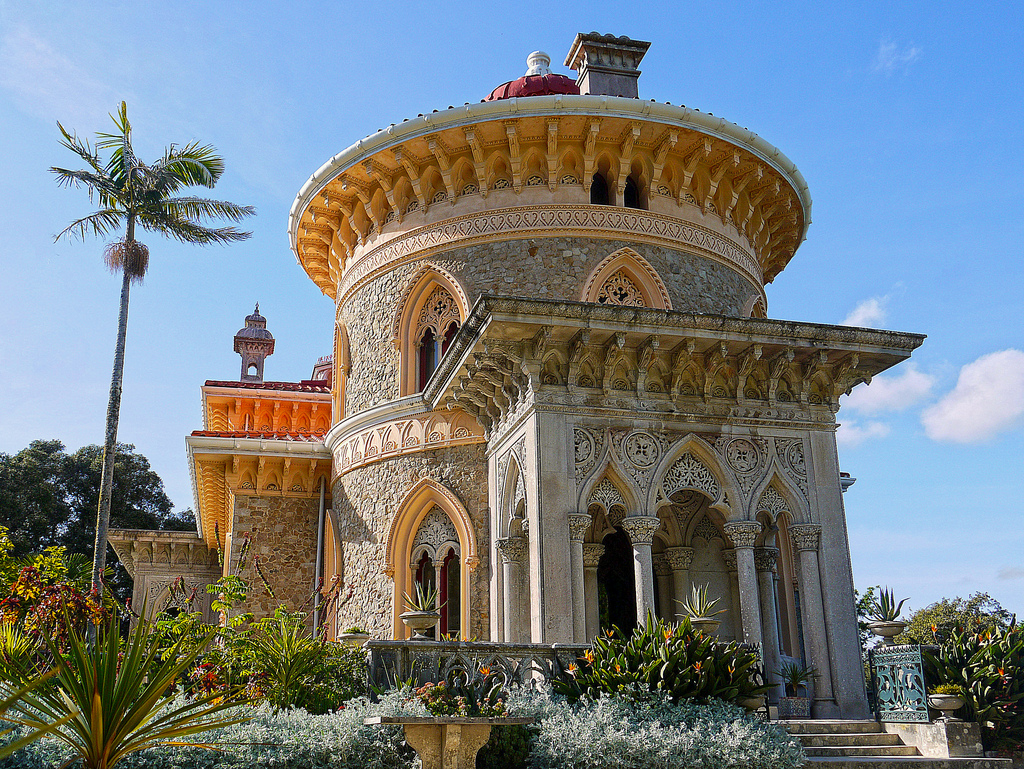
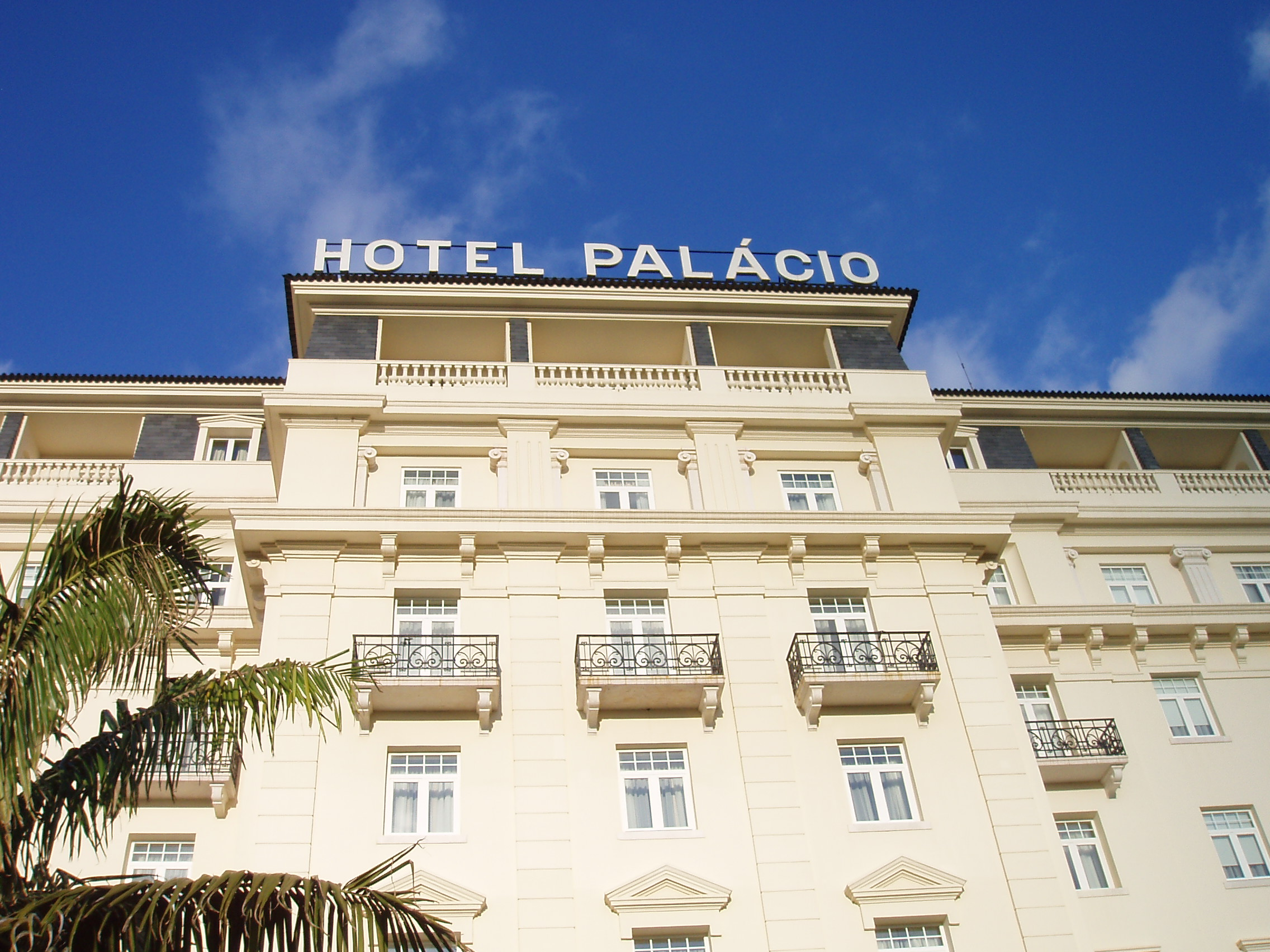
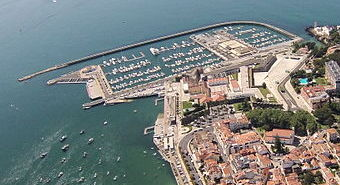
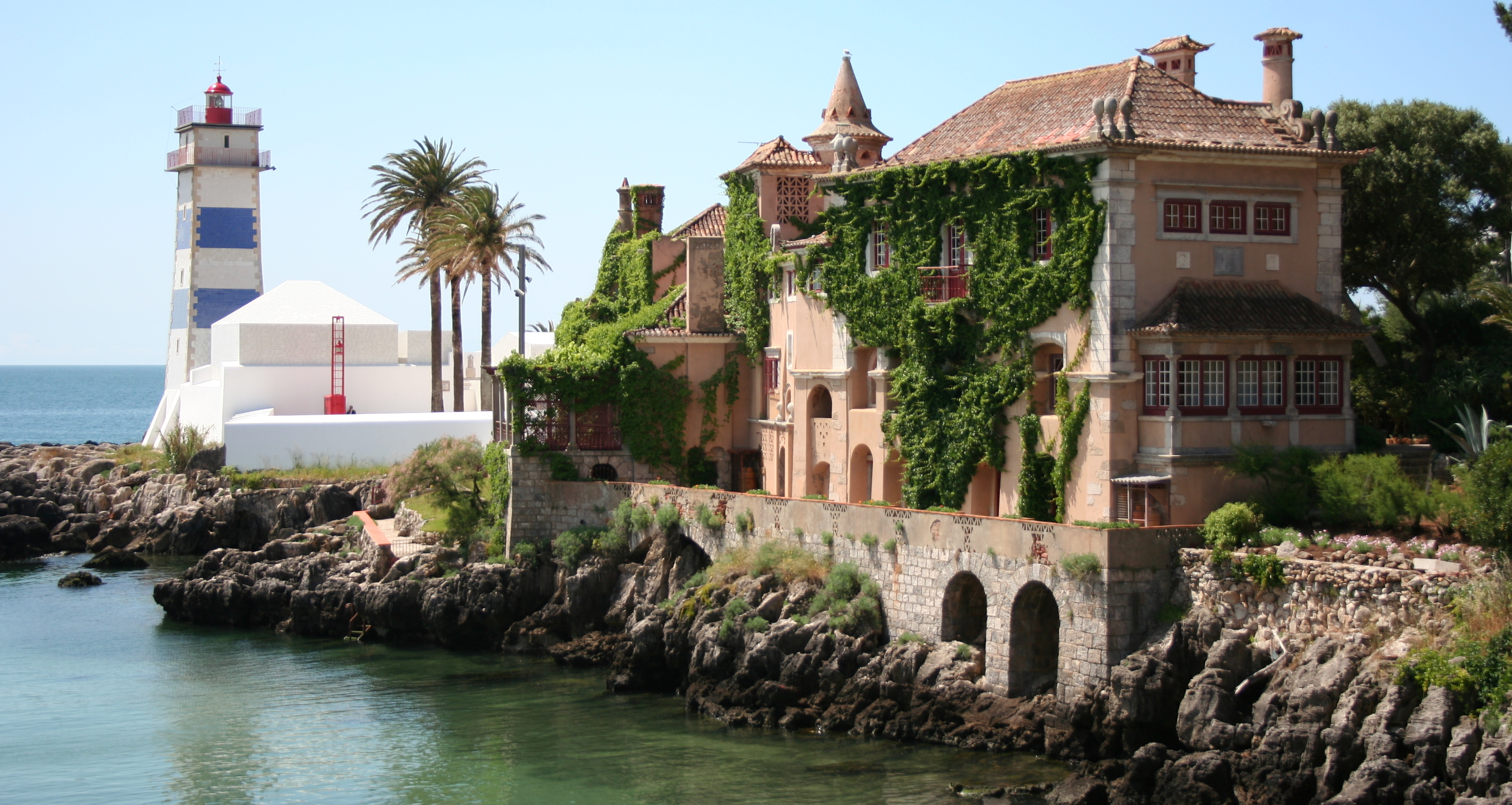
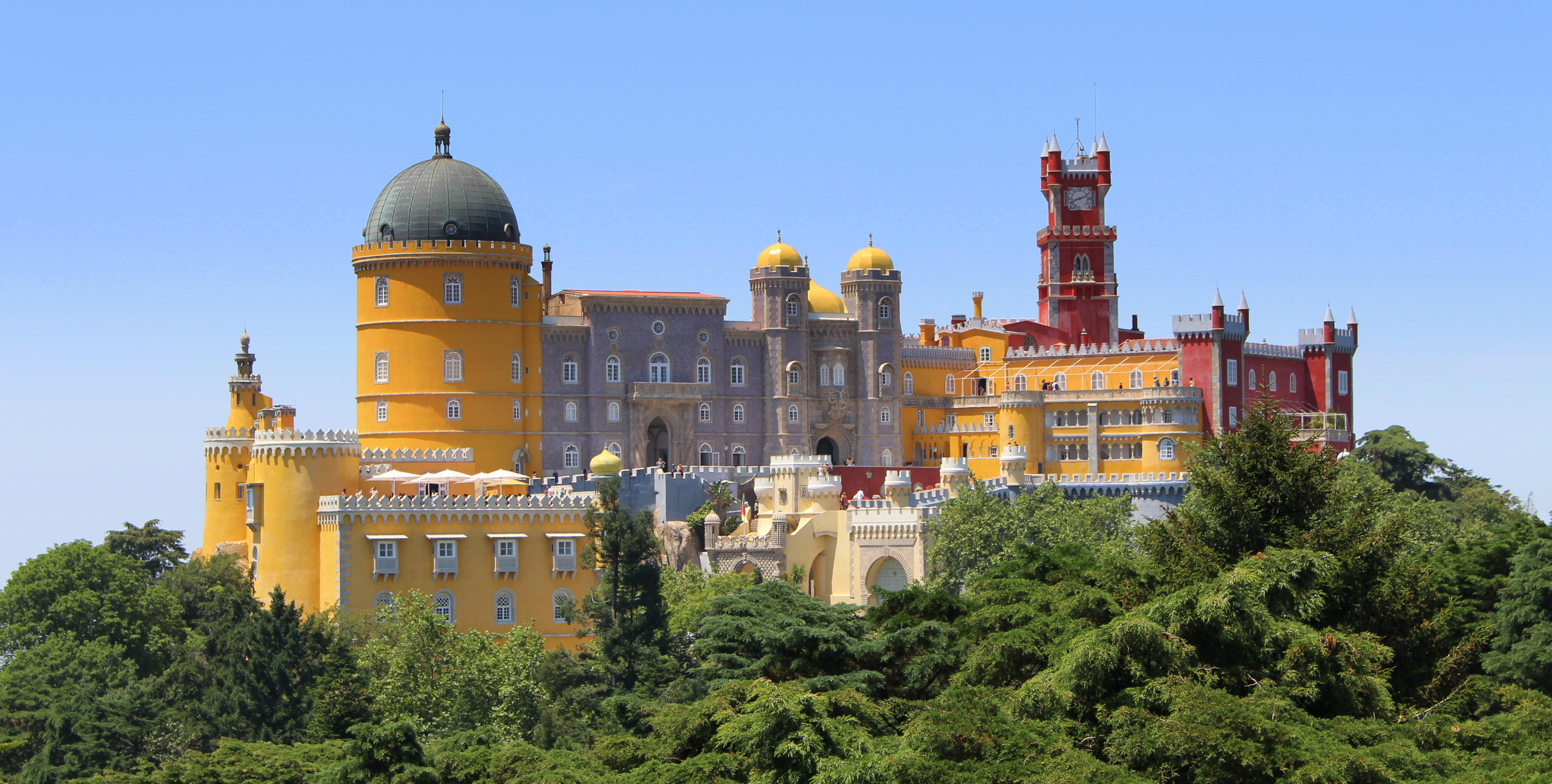
- Clockwise: View of coast from Cascais Citadel; Hotel Palácio in Estoril; Casa de Santa Maria in Cascais; Pena National Palace in Sintra; Cascais Marina; Monserrate Palace in Sintra.
- Country: Portugal
- District: Lisbon District
- Municipalities: Cascais; Oeiras; Sintra

The Portuguese Riviera (Portuguese: Riviera Portuguesa) is a term used for the affluent coastal region to the west of Lisbon, Portugal, centered on the coastal municipalities of Cascais (including Estoril), Oeiras, and Sintra. It is coterminous with the Estoril Coast (Costa do Estoril) and occasionally known as the Costa do Sol (Sun Coast).

The region is internationally known as a luxury destination for its history as a home of the wealthy, the famous, and European royalty. Cascais, Oeiras, and Sintra are consistently ranked among the richest municipalities in Portugal.

Cascais's history as a luxury destination originates in the 1870s, when King Luís I of Portugal and the Portuguese royal family made the seaside town their summer residence, thus attracting other members of Portugal's aristocracy, who established a summer community there. During World War II and the Post-War period, the area's royal affiliations intensified, as many heads of European royal houses and deposed monarchs, including King Edward VIII of the United Kingdom, King Juan Carlos I of Spain, and King Umberto II of Italy made their home in Cascais and Estoril, finding refuge in Portugal's neutrality in the war or from tense political situations in their own countries. Due to its concentration of high-profile personalities, the Riviera became a center of espionage during World War II, inspiring author Ian Fleming in his creation of the James Bond series.

Sintra had been a royal retreat since the Portuguese Renaissance in the 15th century, but it was in the 19th century, when King Fernando II of Portugal decided to build his summer retreat, Pena Palace, in the Sintra Mountains overlooking the Atlantic Ocean, that it became both the center of the Romanticist movement in Portugal and the summer residence of the Portuguese nobility. Famous for its grand estates and palaces, Sintra's belle epoch resulted in its numerous villas, gardens, estates, and palaces that characterize the area, which gained Sintra a UNESCO World Heritage designation. Today Sintra is one of Portugal's most expensive and exclusive real estate markets and similarly known for its high standards of living, consistently ranking as one of the best places to live in Portugal.

== History ==
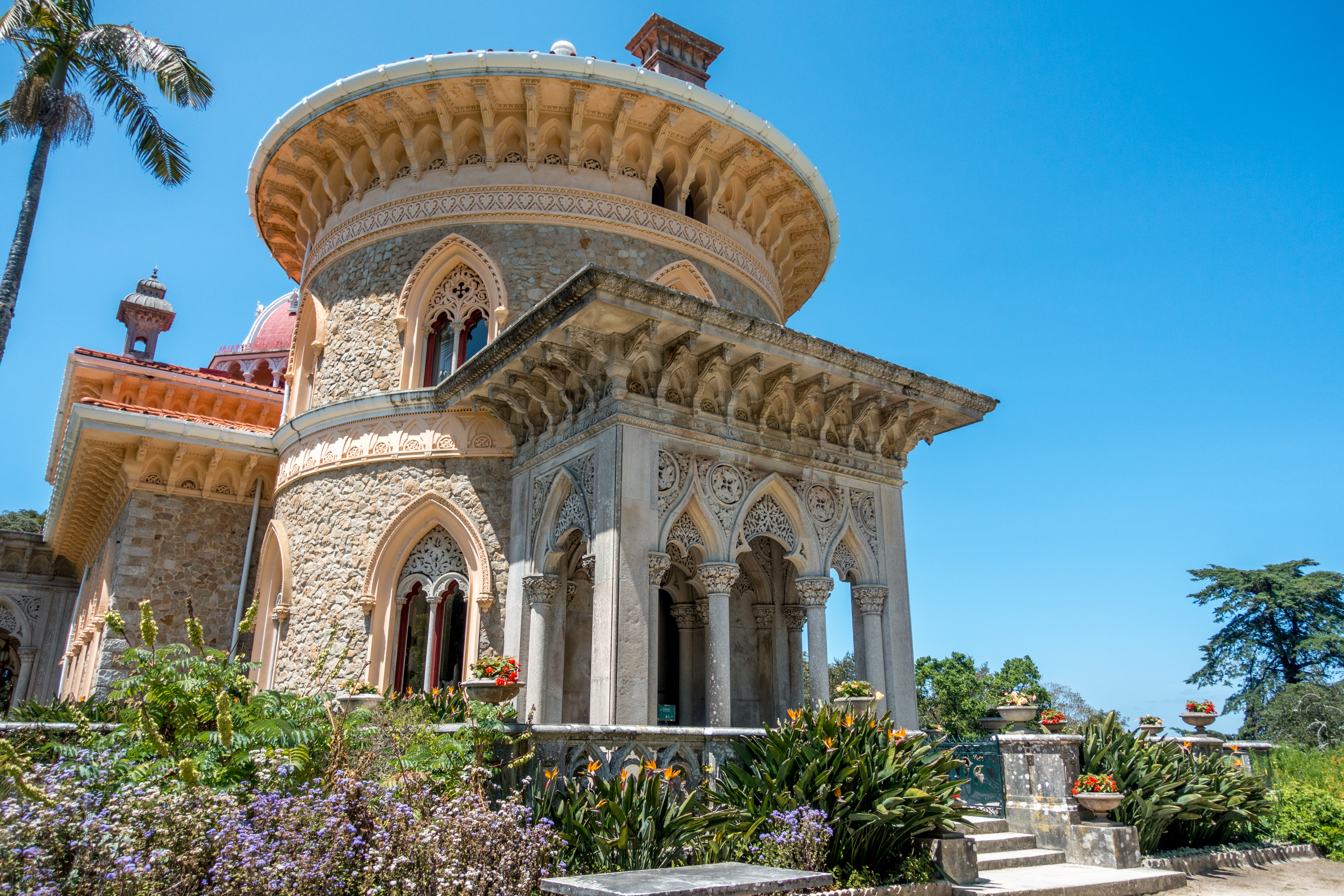
Monserrate Palace in Sintra, noted for its beauty by Lord Byron during his grand tour through the Portuguese Riviera in Childe Harold's Pilgrimage.

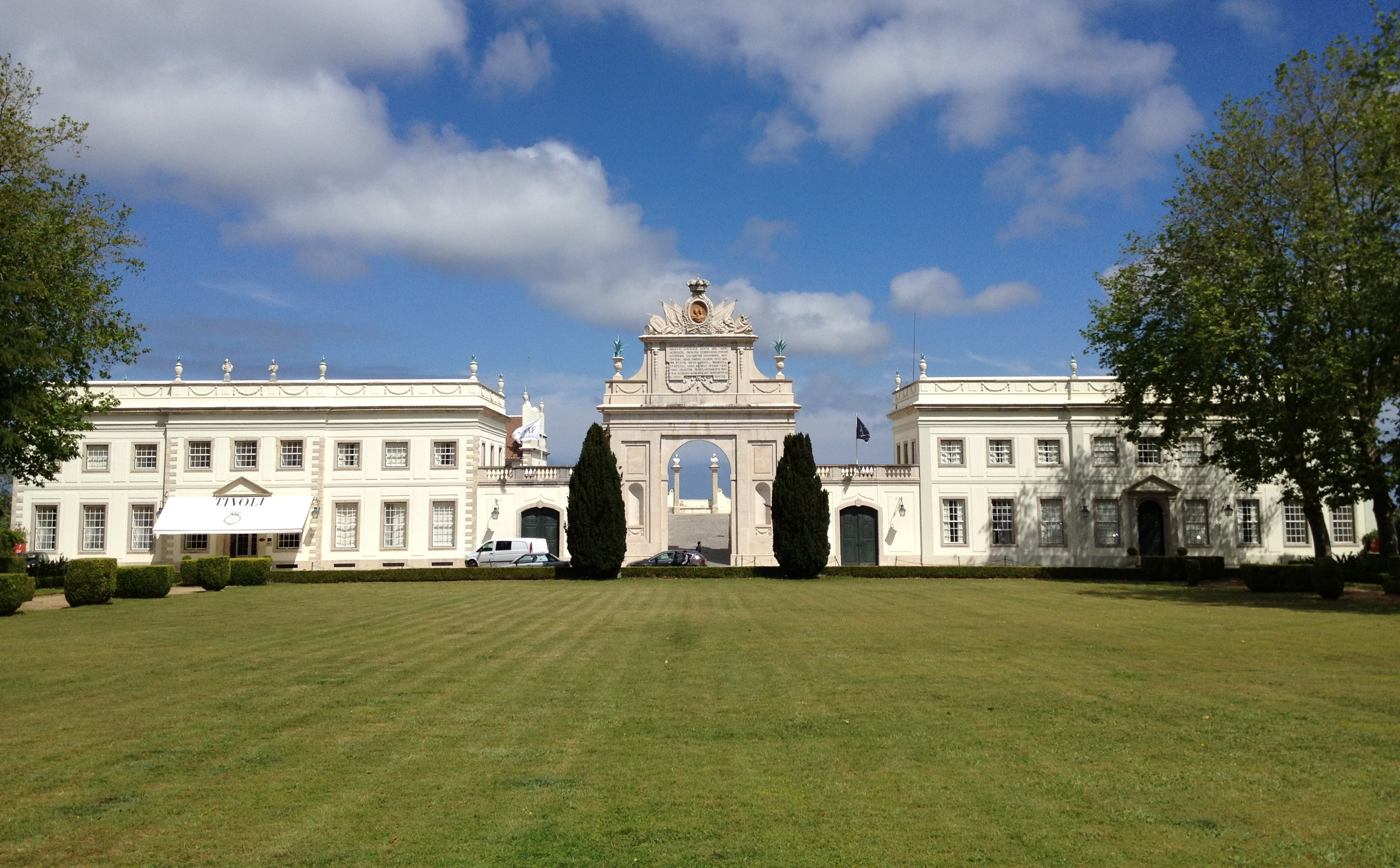

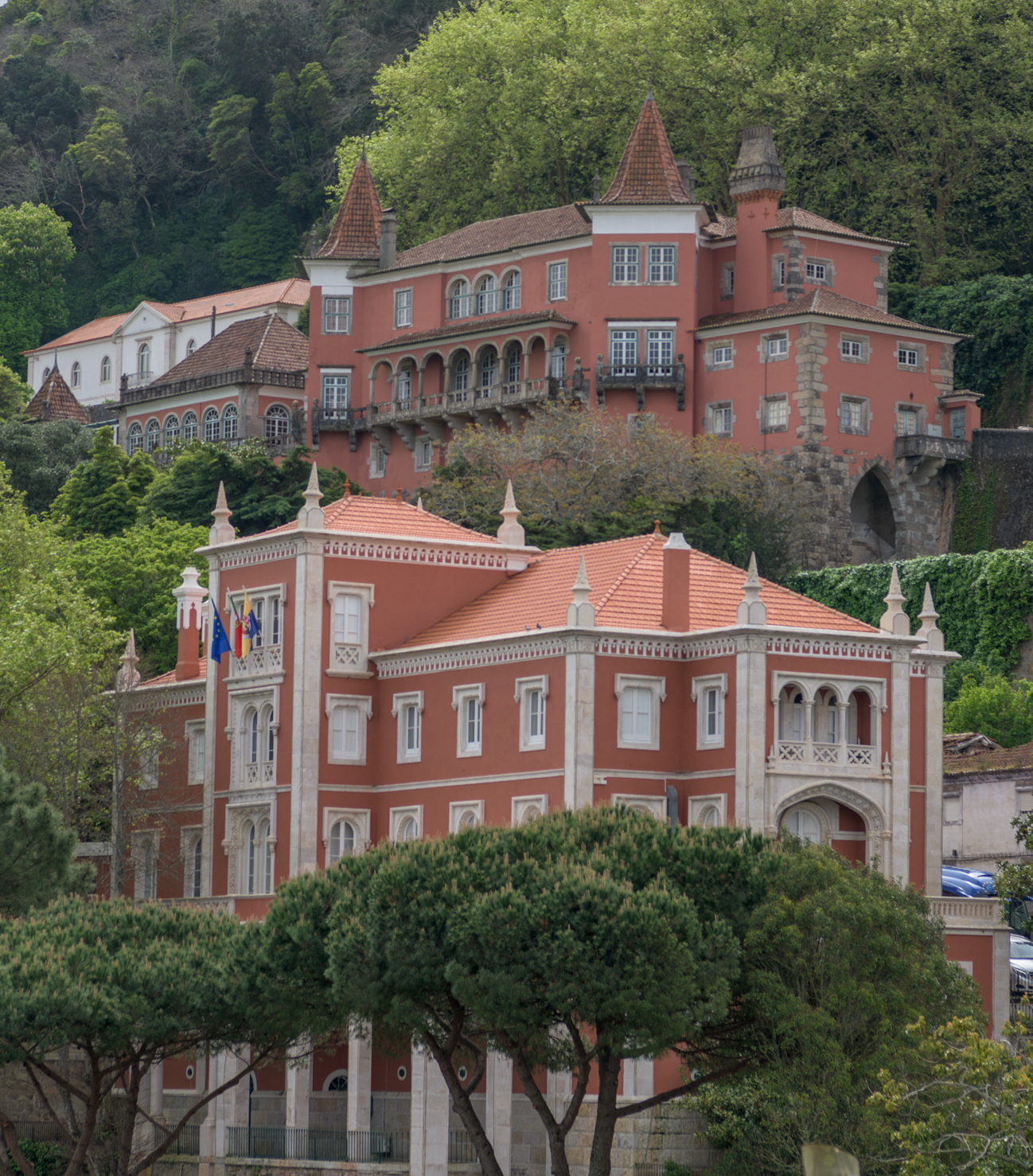
Sintra, a UNESCO World Heritage landscape, is known for its historic estates, such as Seteais Palace (top) and the Casa dos Penedos and the Palácio Valenças (bottom).

=== Origins ===
During the third quarter of the 18th century and practically all of the 19th century, foreign travellers and Portuguese aristocrats, inspired by the Romanticist movement, rediscovered Sintra, a royal retreat during the Portuguese Renaissance, prizing its exotic landscapes and climate. In the summer of 1787, William Beckford stayed with the Marquis of Marialva, master of the horse for the kingdom, at his residence of Seteais Palace. At the beginning of the 19th century Princess Carlota Joaquina, wife of the Regent John, bought the estate and Ramalhão Palace. Between 1791 and 1793, Gerard Devisme constructed a Neo-Gothic mansion on his extensive estate in the Quinta de Monserrate (later known as the Monserrate Palace). Beckford, who remained in Sintra, rented the property from Devisme in 1794. The landscape, covered in fog, also attracted another Englishman, Francis Cook, who occupied the estate, constructing an oriental pavilion. The Palace of Pena, Sintra's exemplary Portuguese Romantic symbol, was initiated by the King-Consort Ferdinand II of Portugal, husband of Queen Maria II of Portugal.

=== 19th century ===
In 1854, the first contract was signed to construct a rail link between Sintra and Lisbon. A decree signed on 26 June 1855 regulated the contract between the government and Count Claranges Lucotte but was later rescinded in 1861. The connection was finally inaugurated on 2 April 1887.

The Portuguese Riviera originated when King Luís I of Portugal ordered a royal residence to be constructed in Cascais Citadel, starting the tradition of Cascais being the Portuguese royal family's Summer residence, which lasted from 1870 to 1908, transforming the seaside village into a cosmopolitan address. Thanks to King Luís I, the citadel was equipped with the country's first electric lights in 1878. Cascais also benefited from the construction of better roads to Lisbon and Sintra, a casino, a bullfight ring, a sports club, and improvements to basic infrastructure for the population. Many noble families built impressive mansions still to be seen in the town centre and environs. The first railway arrived in 1889.

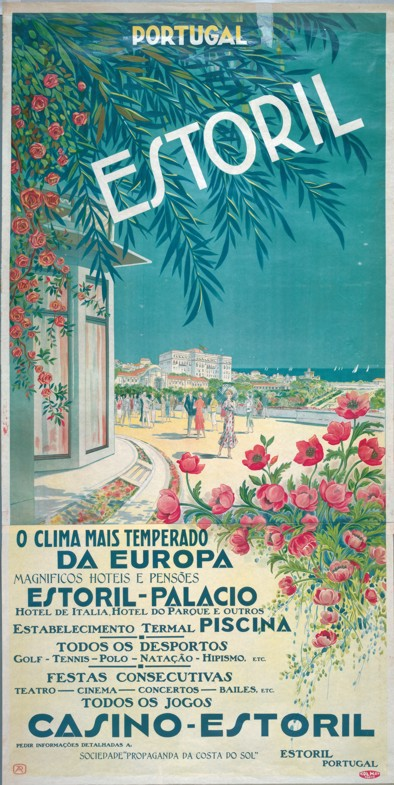
An advertisement for Estoril and its amenities; first half of the 20th century.

In 1896, King Carlos I of Portugal, a lover of all maritime activities, installed in Cascais Citadel the first oceanographic laboratory in Portugal. The King himself led a total of 12 scientific expeditions to the coast; these ended in 1908 with his assassination in Lisbon.

From the second half of the 19th century into the first decades of the 20th century, Sintra also became a privileged place for artists: musicians such as José Vianna da Motta; composers such as Alfredo Keil, painters like João Cristino da Silva (author of one of the most celebrated canvases of Portuguese Romantic art, "Cinco Artistas em Sintra"), writers such as Eça de Queirós or Ramalho Ortigão, all these people lived, worked or got inspiration from Sintra's landscapes.

By the beginning of the 20th century, Sintra was recognized as a summer resort visited by aristocrats and millionaires. Among these, Carvalho Monteiro, owner of a considerable fortune (known as "Monteiro dos Milhões") constructed near the main town on an estate he bought from the Baroness of Regaleira, the Quinta da Regaleira, regarded as a prime example of Neo-Manueline architecture.

=== World War II ===
During the Second World War, the region was the centre of spies and diplomatic secrecy, situations that provided the region with a cosmopolitan atmosphere and sophistication. Owing to the vision of Fausto Cardoso de Figueiredo and his business partner Augusto Carreira de Sousa, it became an international tourist destination both during and after the Second World War.

In July 1940, Edward, Duke of Windsor (former Edward VIII of the United Kingdom) and his wife, Wallis Simpson, fled from Occupied France to Estoril, where they lived for a few weeks in the home of Ricardo de Espírito Santo, a Portuguese banker with both British and German contacts.

During that time, several dignitaries and exiles came to Estoril: Miklós Horthy, the regent of the Kingdom of Hungary (lived and died in exile after the Second World War); the Infante Juan, Count of Barcelona (father of Juan Carlos I of Spain) and the King resided in the territory, as did Umberto II of Italy and Carol II of Romania.

It was also in this location that former Portuguese dictator António de Oliveira Salazar had a summer house. It was Salazar who ordered the construction of the E.N.6 motorway, more commonly referred to as the Avenida Marginal, in order for him to quickly travel by car between Cascais and Lisbon. Until then the accessway was nothing more than a dirt road. The roadway permitted the dictator to travel rapidly, and with fewer stops, and it was not possible for him to be recognized easily in transit.

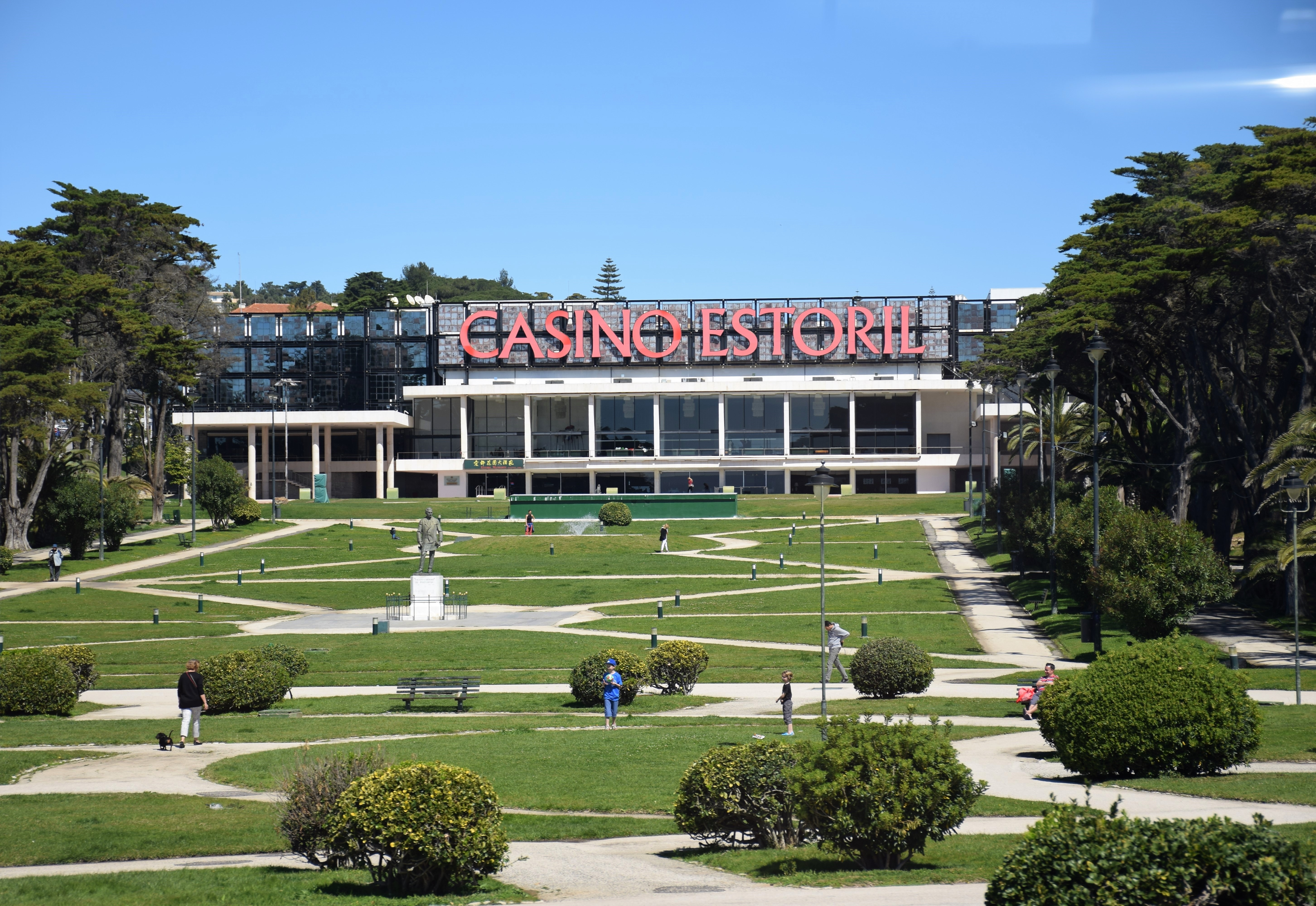
Casino Estoril, with its gardens facing the Atlantic Ocean, is one of Europe's largest casinos.

Complementing the jet-set community that prospered in the region, Casino Estoril, Europe's largest casino, was founded in 1958.

=== Today ===
Today the towns of the Portuguese Riviera continue to host the Portuguese elite and be a vacation destination for international tourists. The Riviera plays an important part in tourism in Portugal.

A large expatriate community continues to exist, primarily in Cascais and Sintra, leading to the majority of Lisbon's international schools being located within the area (with Carlucci American International School and TASIS Portugal in Sintra, St Julian's School and St Dominic's School in Cascais, and Oeiras International School).

Luxury gated communities have greatly developed in the region in the late 20th and early 21st century, including Quinta da Marinha (Cascais), Quinta Patino (Estoril), Quinta da Beloura and Quinta da Penha Longa (both in Linhó, Sintra).

Since the middle of the 20th century, the region has come to play host to numerous international sports and entertainment festivals, such as the Lisbon & Estoril Film Festival (in Estoril), the 4 Hours of Estoril endurance race (in Cascais), and NOS Alive music festival (in Algés). The Cascais Marina has hosted many important events, including the America's Cup World Series.

== Geography ==
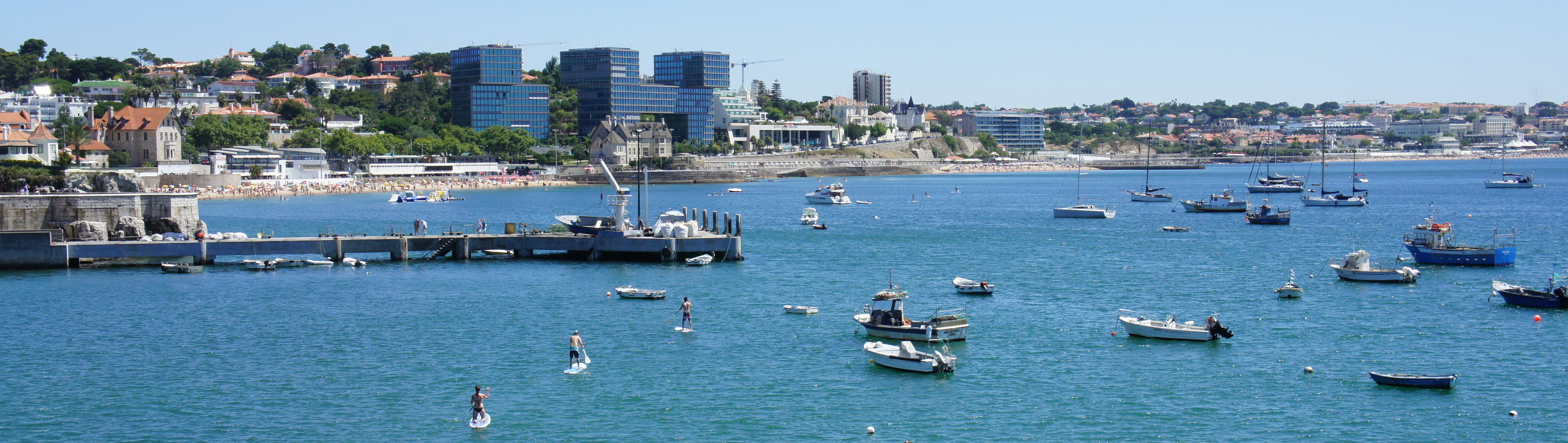
The Portuguese Riviera is spread along the Costa do Sol, also known as the Estoril Coast.

=== Climate ===
The region has a Mediterranean climate, influenced by the Atlantic Ocean and characterized by moderate temperatures and wet winters.

The climate in the area of Cabo da Roca, the westernmost point of Europe, is primarily semi-arid.

The Sintra Mountains are considered moderately humid, but precipitation in the mountains is higher than in the surrounding areas. The position of Sintra in the natural landscape of the Sintra Mountains is influenced by the existence of a micro-climate. Due to its micro-climate, the area has developed a dense foliage with a rich botanical diversity.

The coast along Praia do Guincho, located within the bounds of the Sintra-Cascais Natural Park, is known for its particularly strong winds and powerful waves, making it a popular destination for surfing, kitesurfing and windsurfing.

=== Parks ===
Natural parks & gardens of the Portuguese Riviera

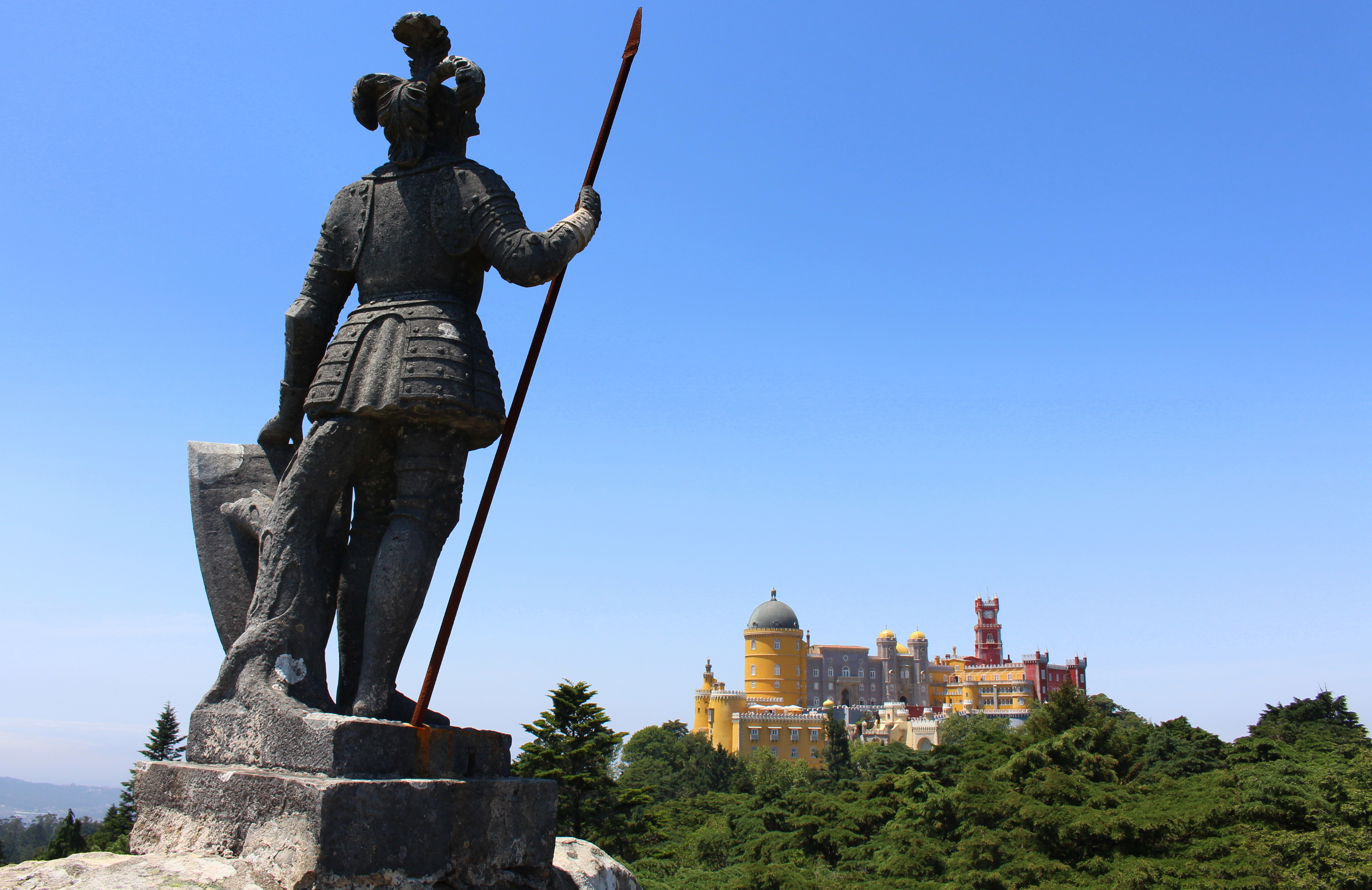
Parque da Pena

Cabo da Roca

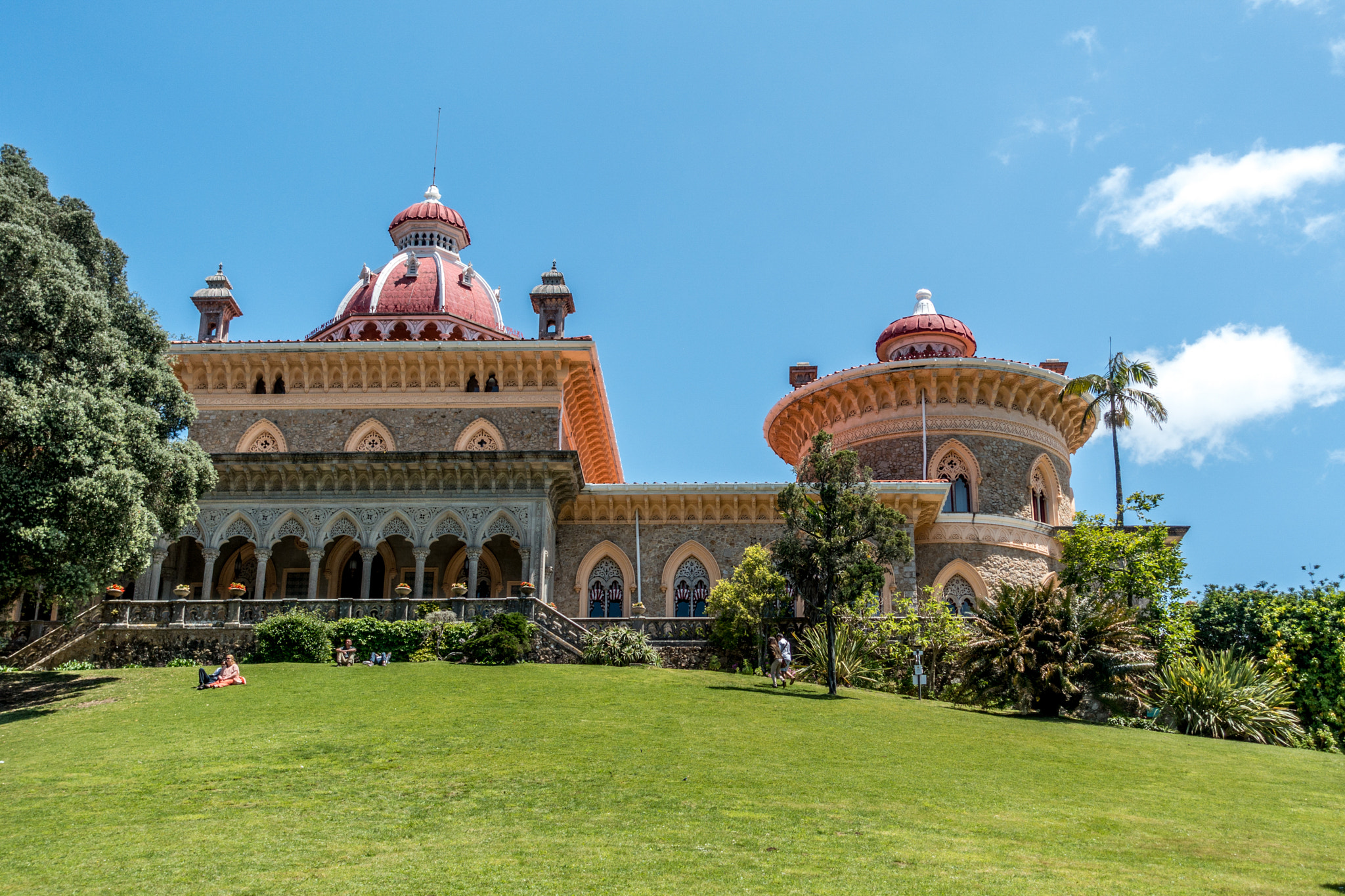
Parque de Monserrate

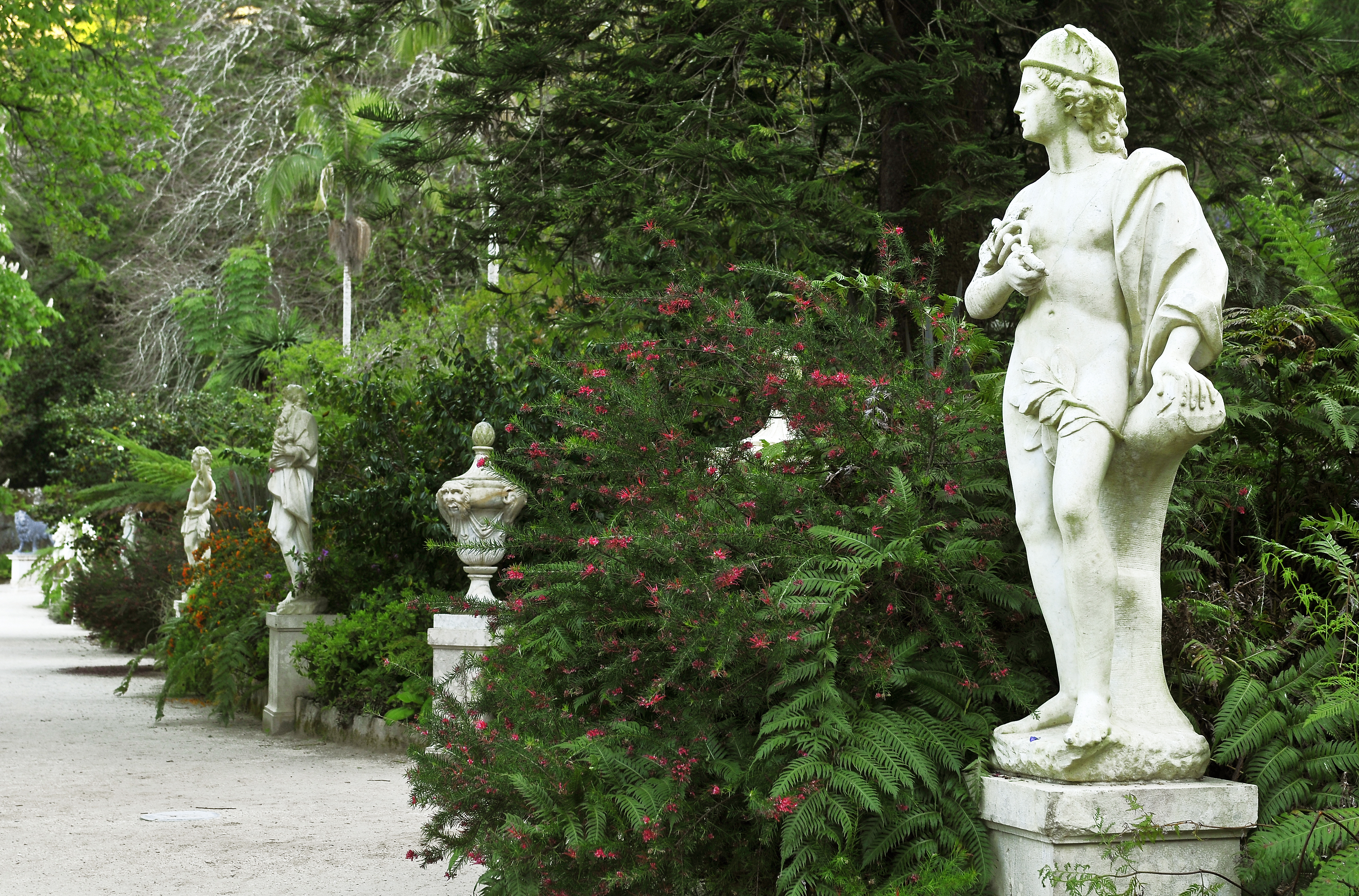
Jardim da Regaleira

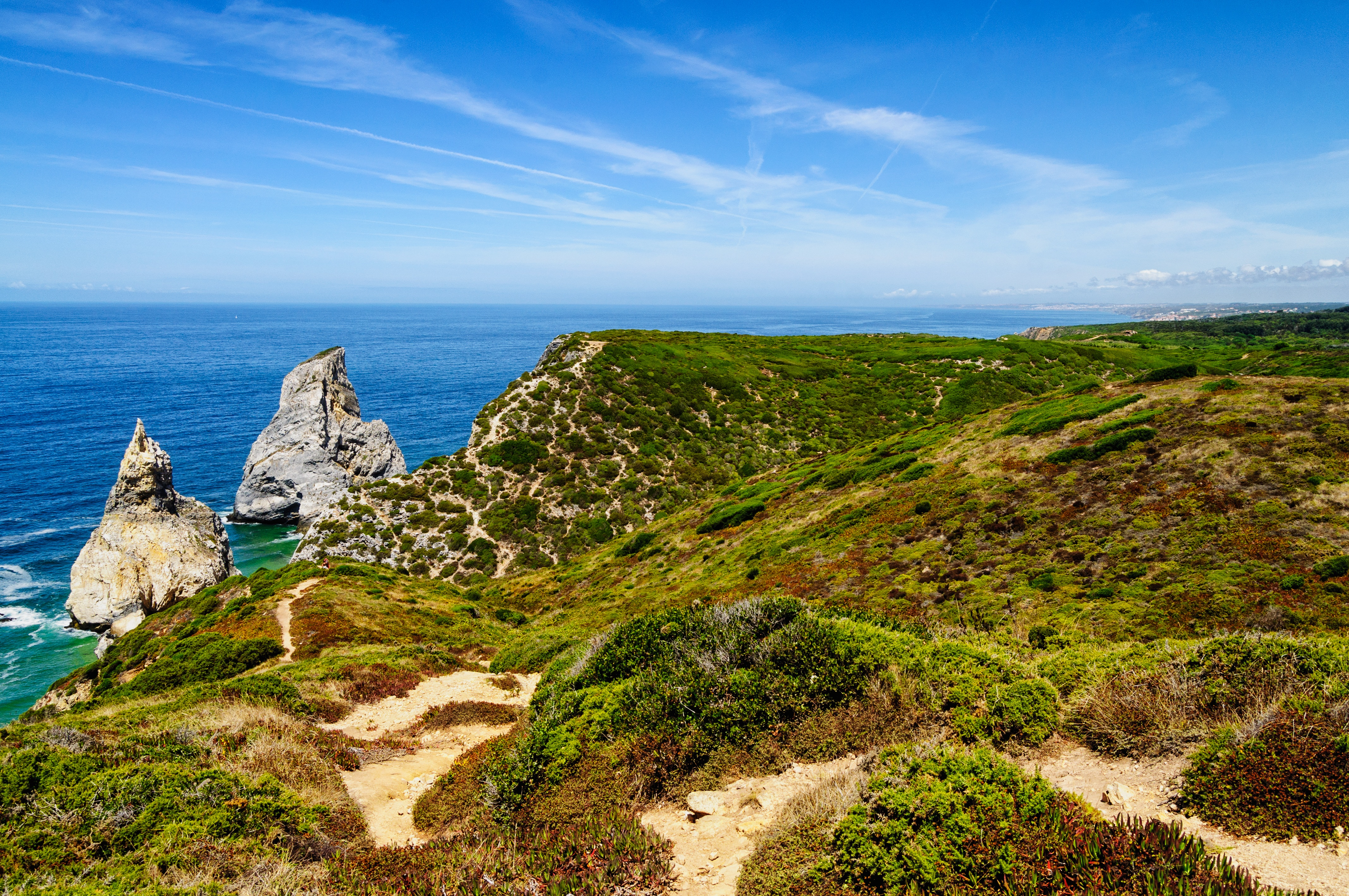
Praia da Ursa

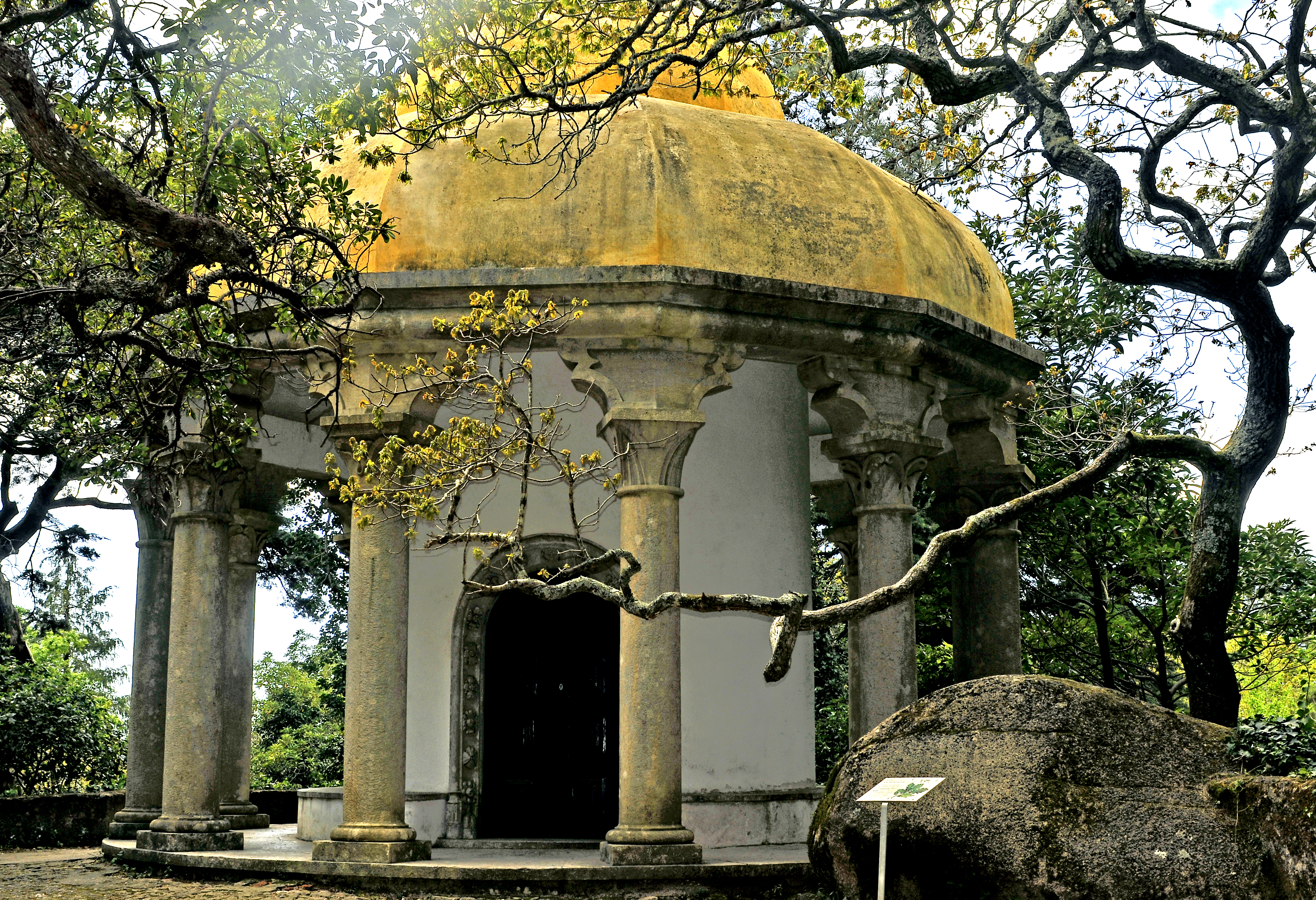
Parque da Pena

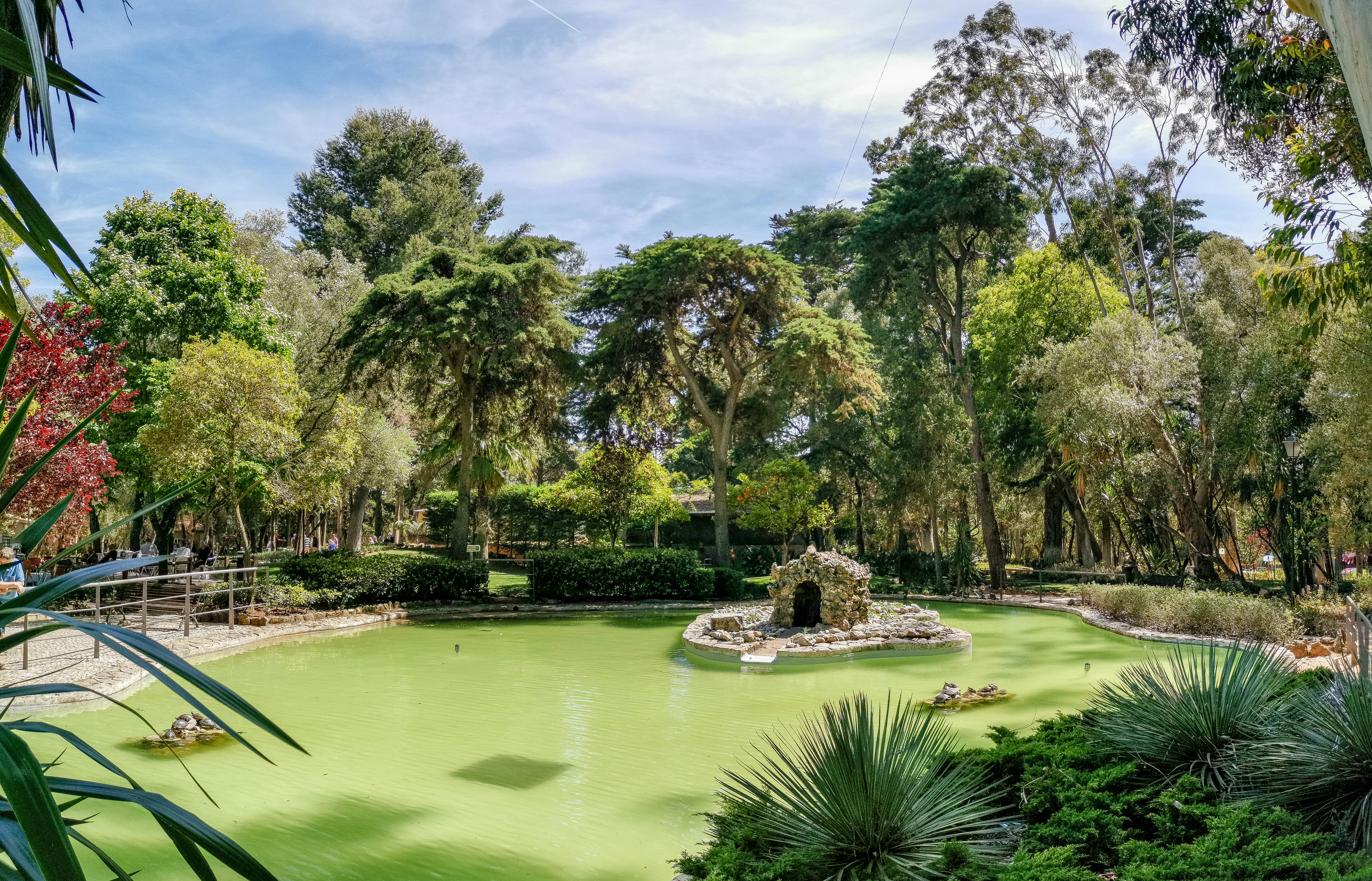
Parque Marechal Carmona

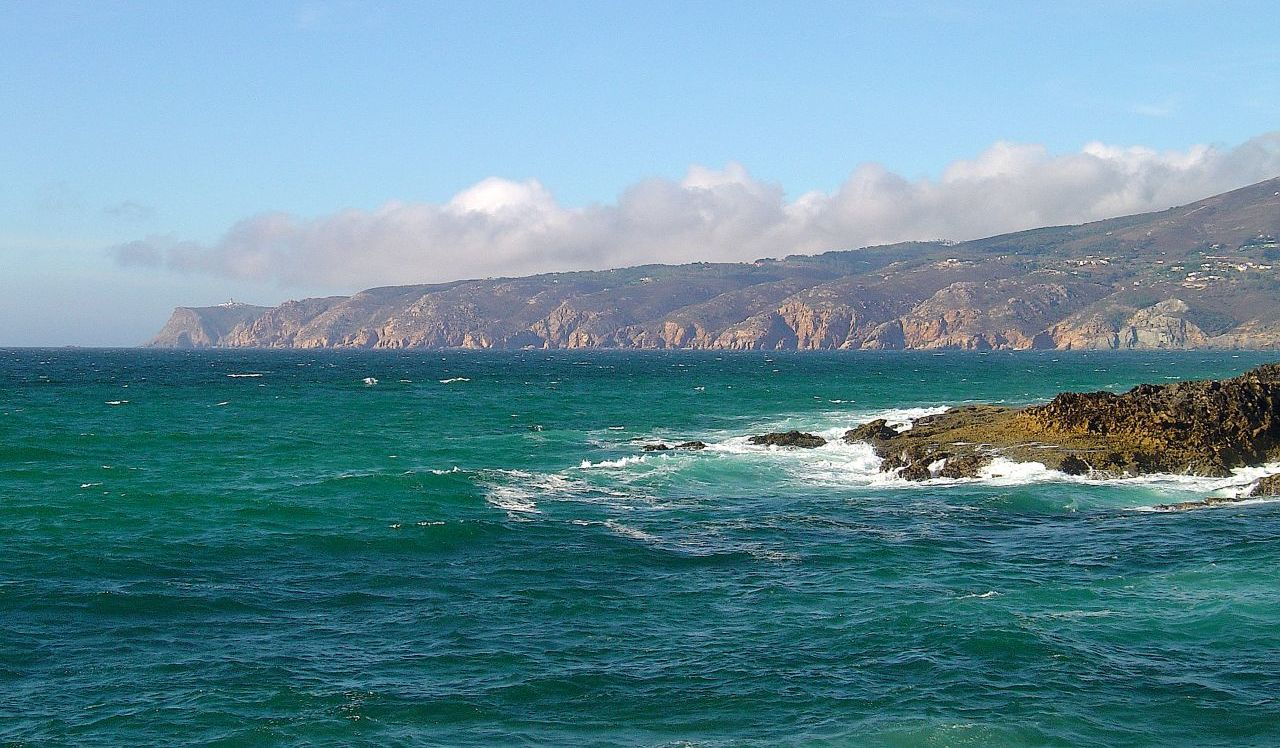
Praia do Guincho

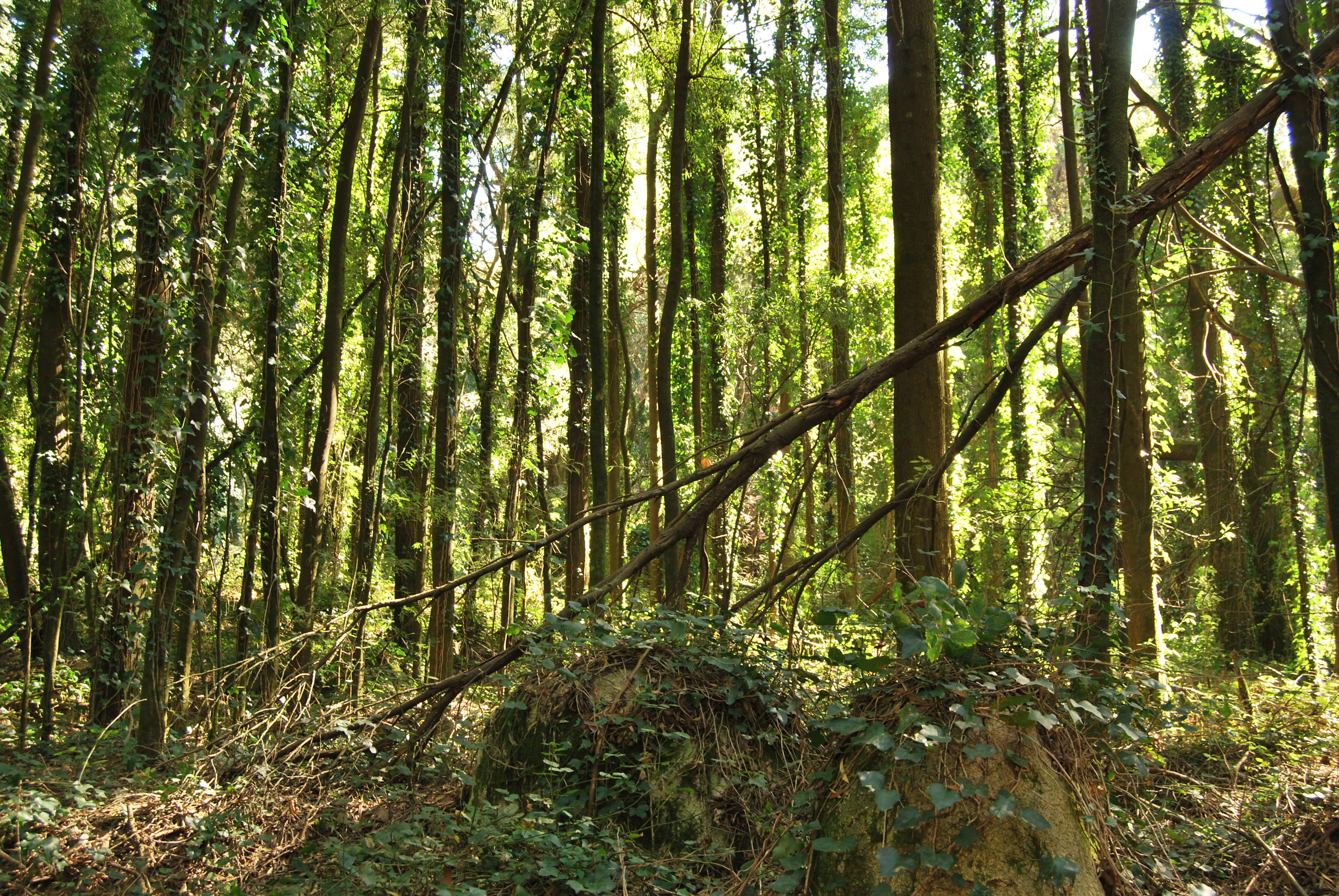
Sintra-Cascais Natural Park

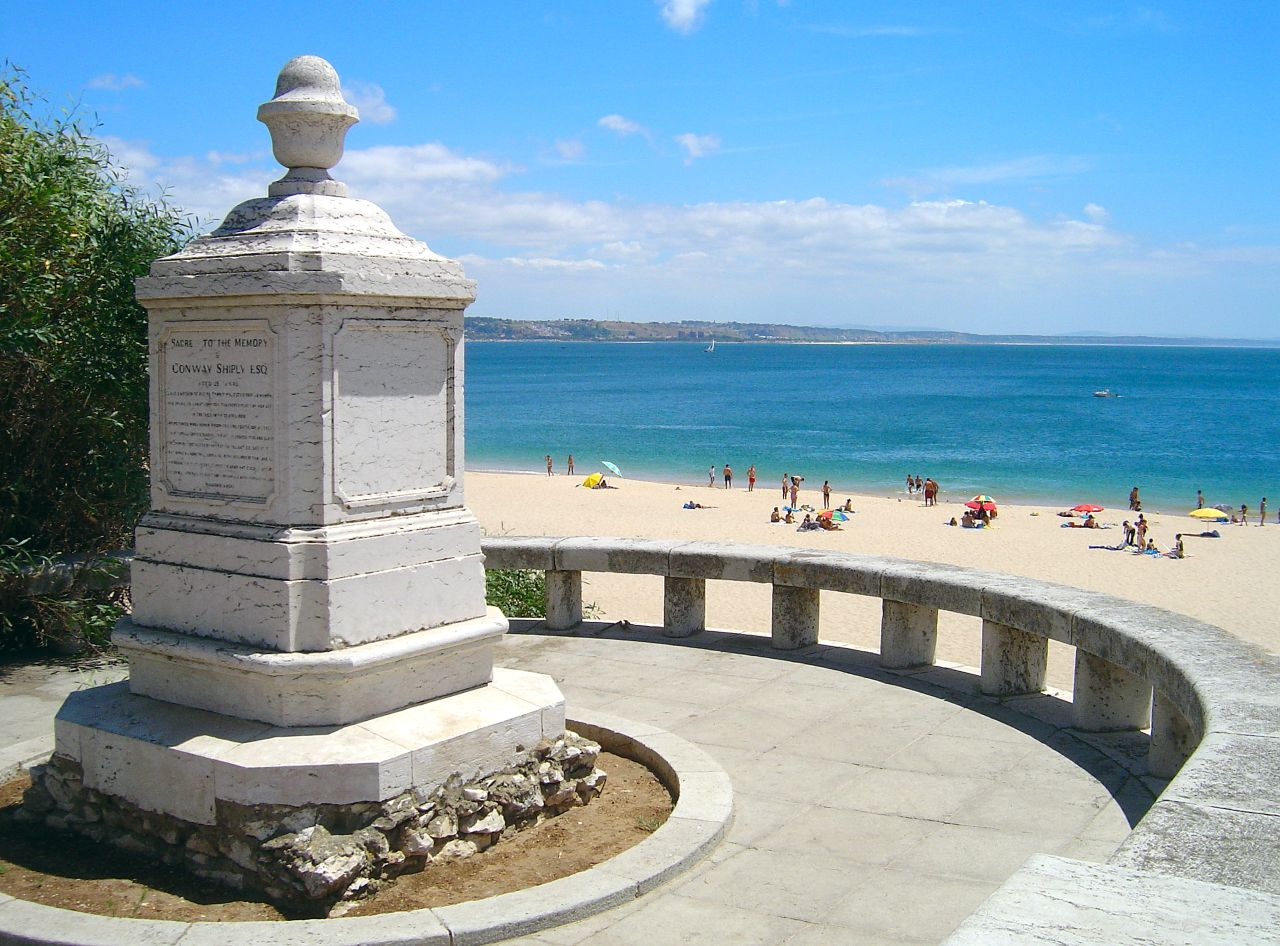
Praia de Paço de Arcos

=== Places ===
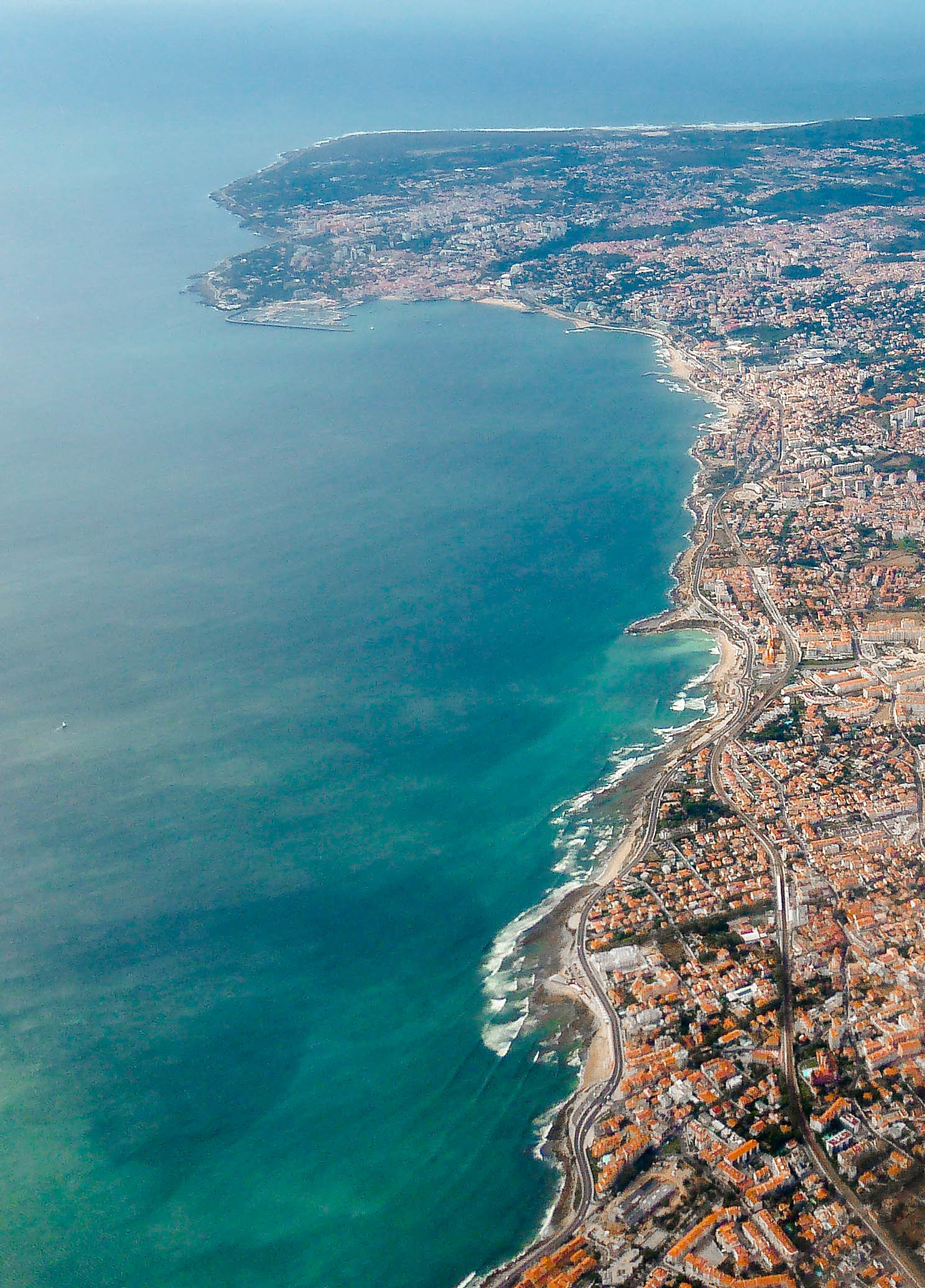
The Portuguese Riviera stretches along the Costa do Sol or Estoril Coast, on the Atlantic Ocean.

Places following the broadest definition of the Portuguese Riviera:

- Cascais
  - Estoril
  - Carcavelos
  - Parede
  - Alcabideche
- Sintra
  - Linhó
  - Queluz
  - São Pedro de Penaferrim
  - Colares
  - Belas
- Oeiras
  - Paço de Arcos
  - São Julião da Barra
  - Caxias

== Culture ==
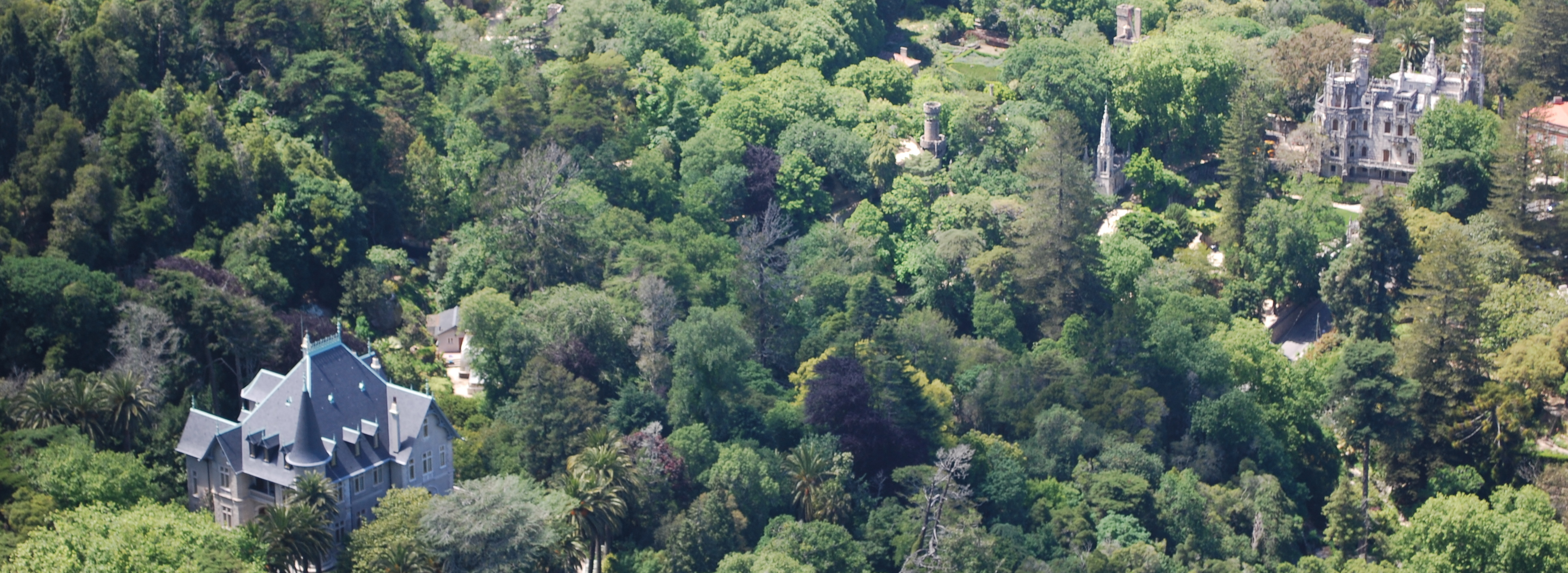
Villas in the Sintra Mountains (Chalet Biester on the left and Quinta da Regaleira on the right).

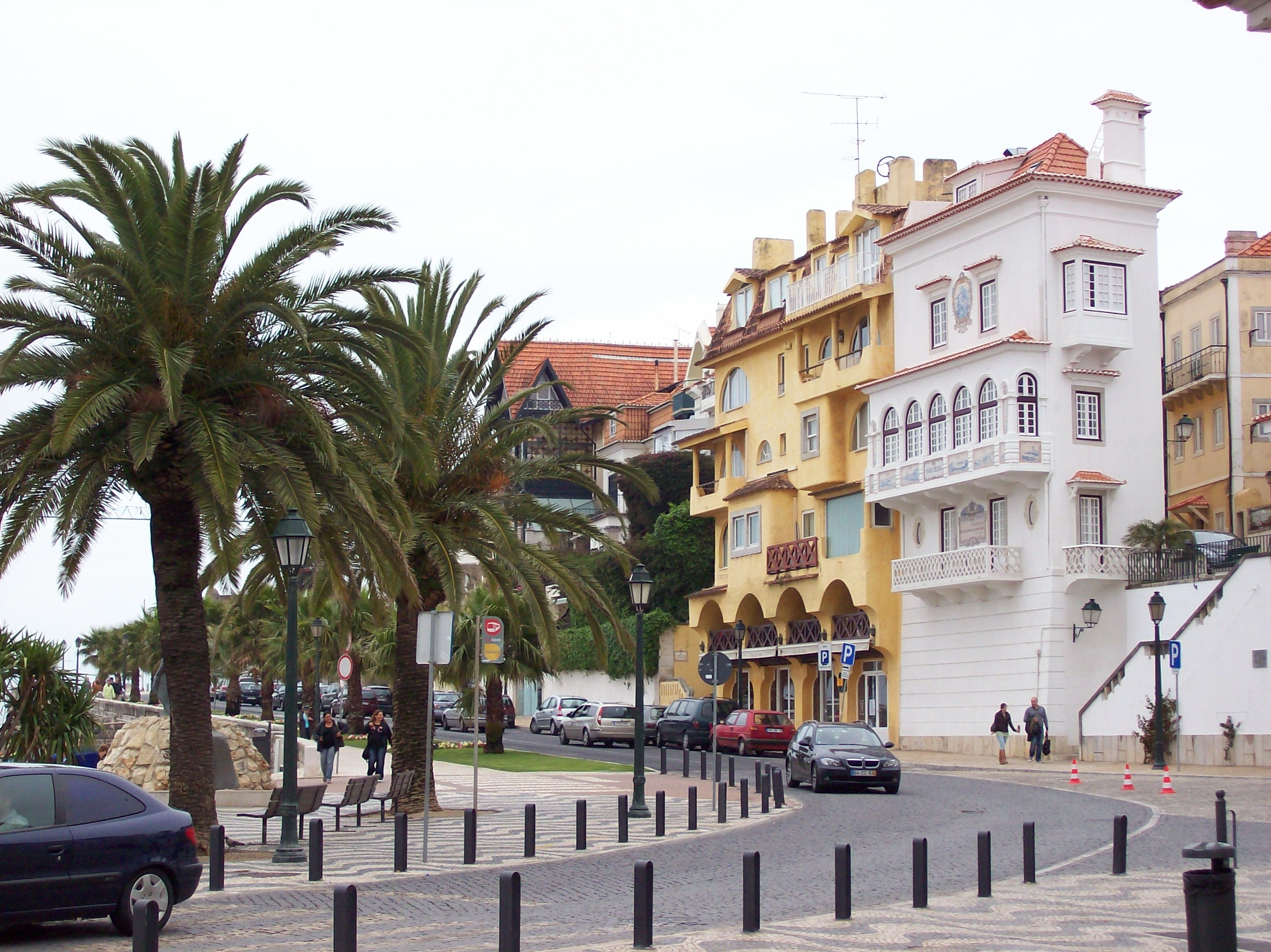
King Carlos I Avenue, Cascais.

The Portuguese Riviera is famed as a bastion of culture in Portugal, as the home to numerous prestigious institutions, art galleries, museums, and a cultural agenda including various international music festivals, film festivals, concerts, international summit meetings, and cultural festivals, among others.

The riviera is home to numerous Michelin star restaurants and known as a culinary destination for Portuguese cuisine and international cuisine alike.

Summer architecture, a Portuguese architectural movement of the 19th and early 20th century, originated in the Riviera, following the Portuguese Royal Family's arrival in the region in 1870.

The Portuguese School of Equestrian Art, one of the "Big Four" most prestigious classical riding academies in the world, is based at Queluz National Palace in Sintra.

=== Museums and galleries ===
The Casa das Histórias Paula Rego, a museum and art gallery designed by Souto de Moura, houses the largest collection of works by famed artist Paula Rego.

The Museum of Portuguese Music, in Estoril, is dedicated to the study and history of the music of Portugal.

The Palace of the Counts of Castro Guimarães, in Cascais, Monserrate Palace, a Romanticist villa in Sintra, and Quinta da Regaleira, 19th-century Neo-Manueline palace, are all estates that are open to the public, serving to show the Portuguese nobility historically lived on the Riviera, with notable differences in the architecture and lifestyles between Cascais aristocrats and Sintra nobles.

The NewsMuseum in Sintra is one of the first museums in Europe dedicated to the study of the news and media.

The Sintra Natural History Museum is an internationally recognized museum of natural history in the historic center of Sintra.

Cultural institutions of the Portuguese Riviera

Queluz National Palace

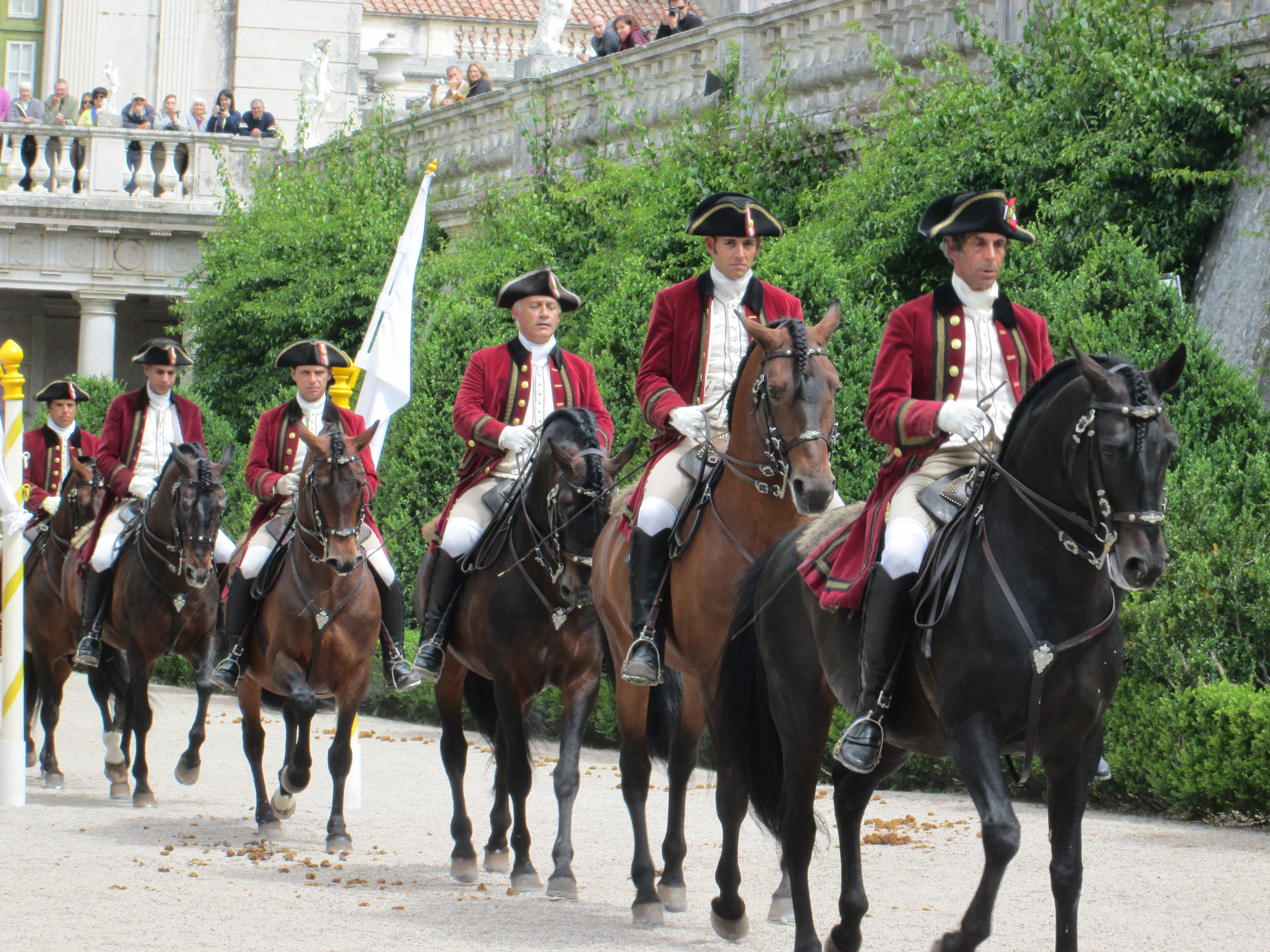
Portuguese School of Equestrian Art at Queluz

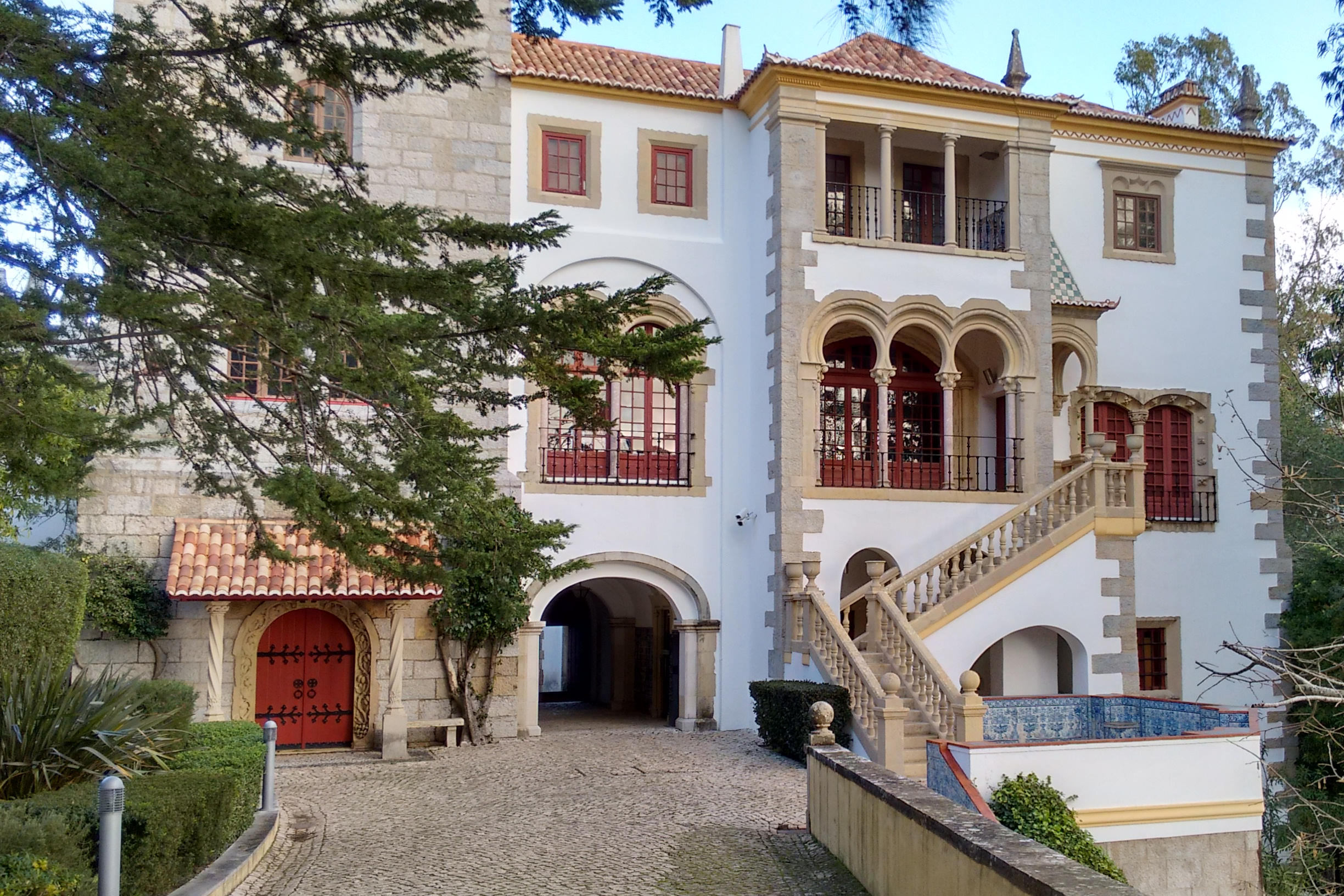
Museum of Portuguese Music

Casa das Histórias Paula Rego

Sintra National Palace

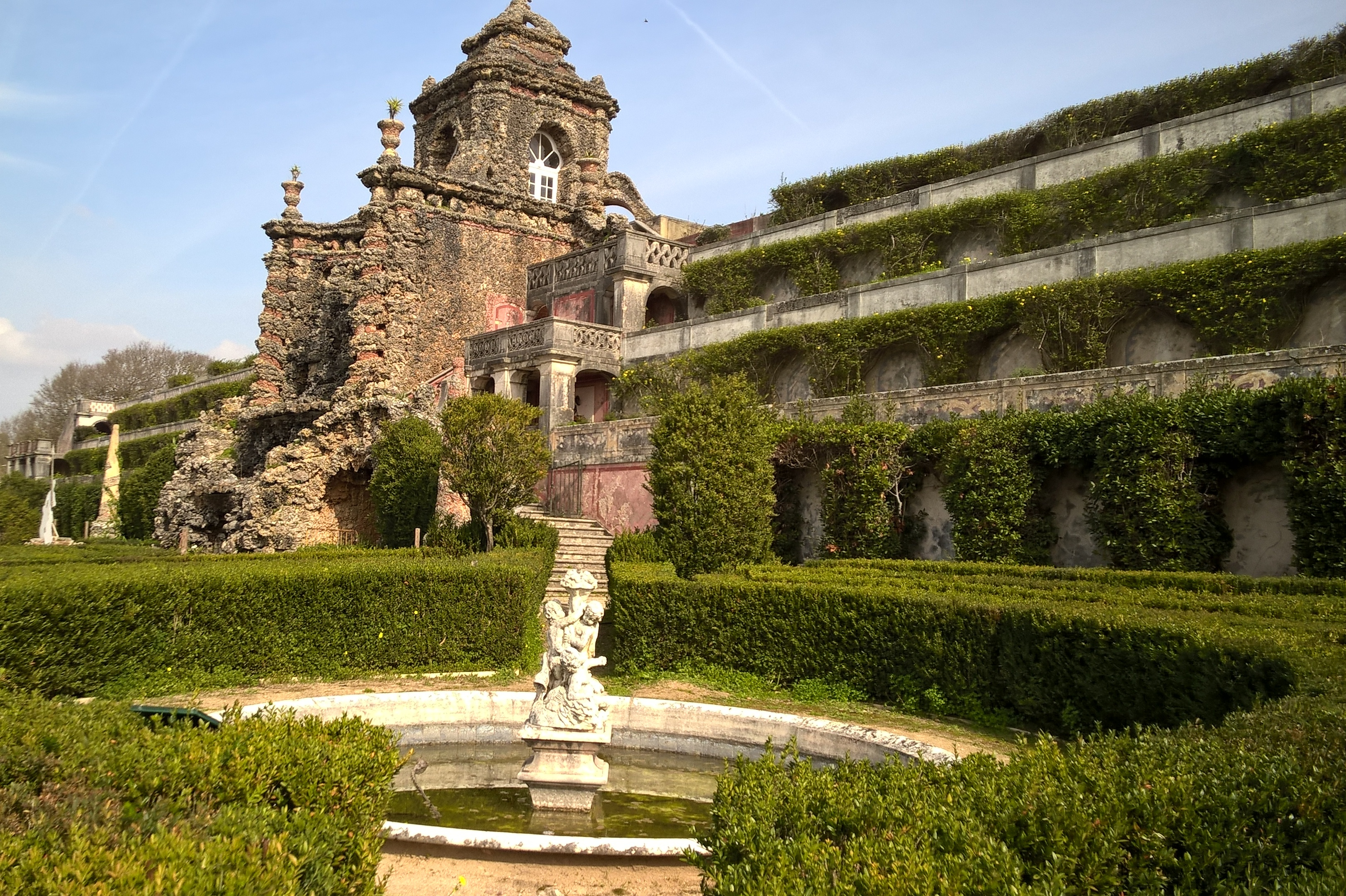
Royal Quinta of Caxias

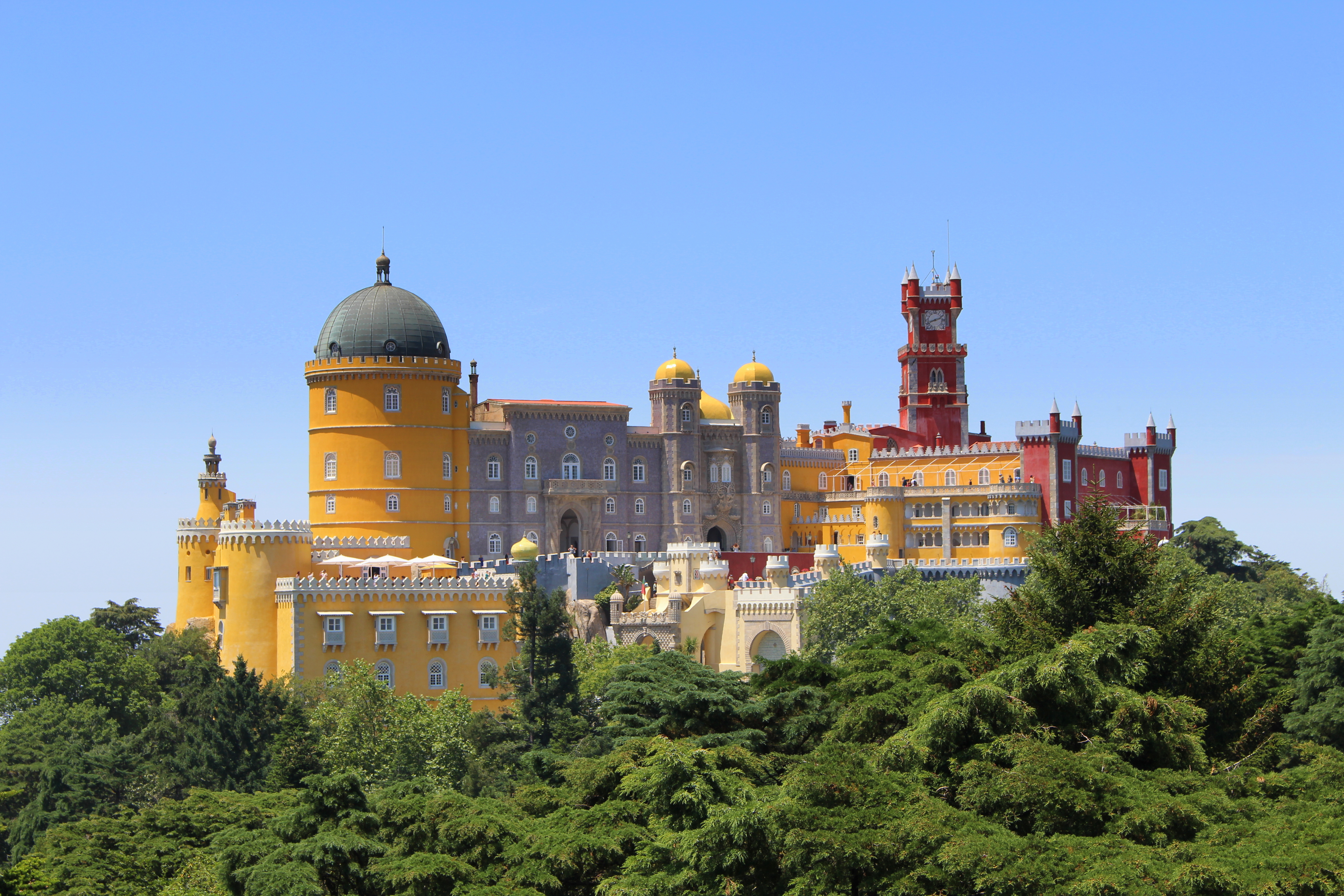
Pena National Palace

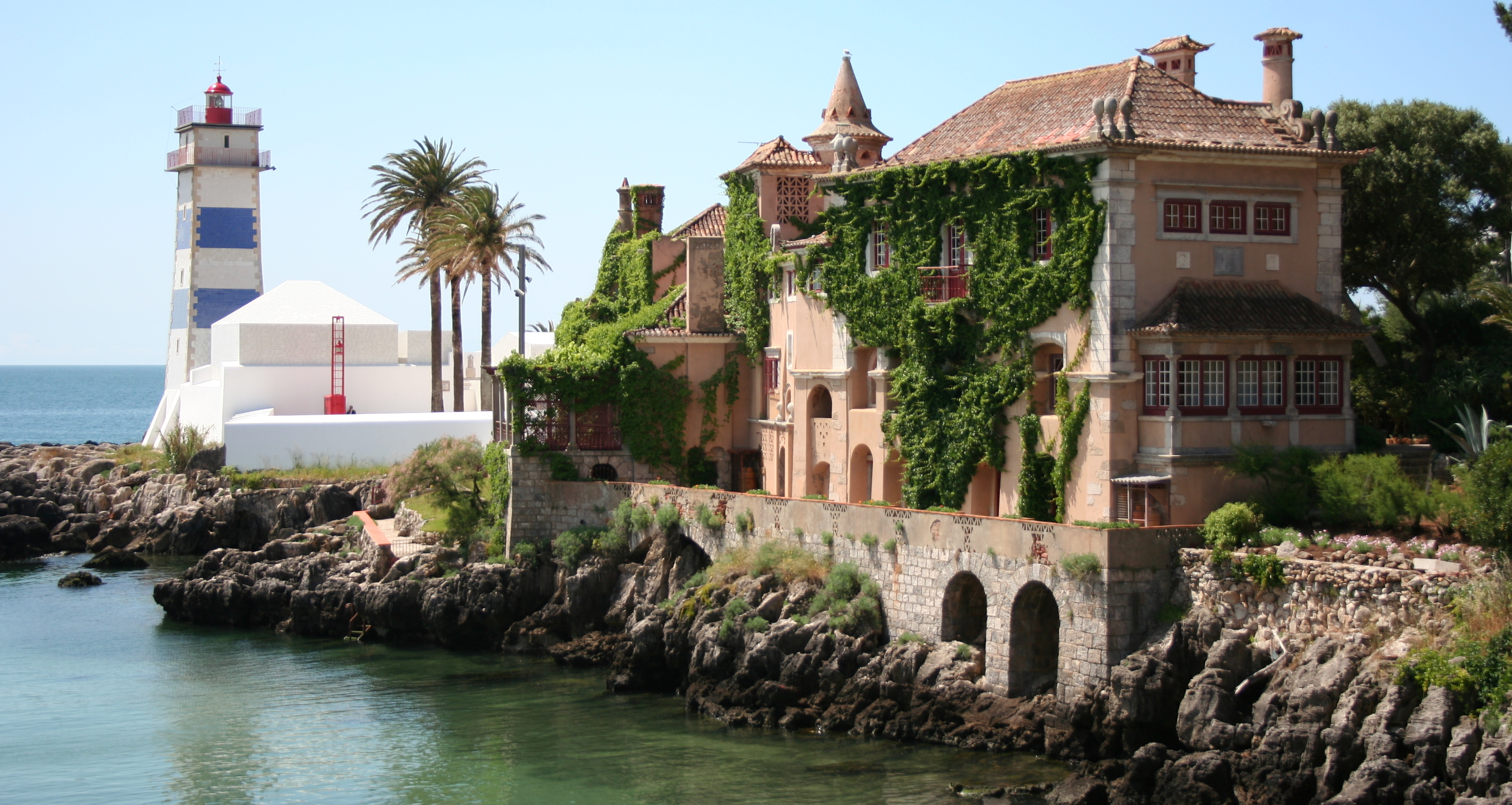
Casa de Santa Maria

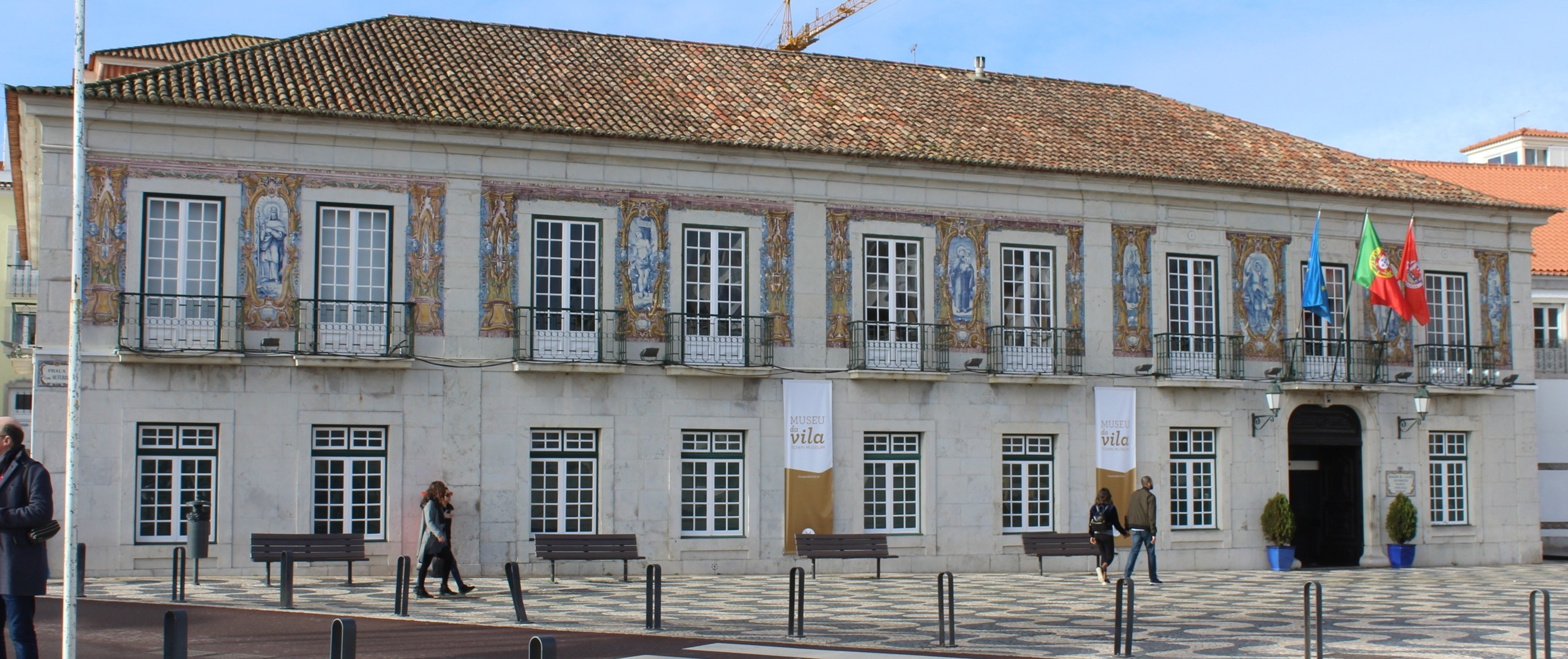
Cascais Town Museum

Palace of the Marquês de Pombal in Oeiras

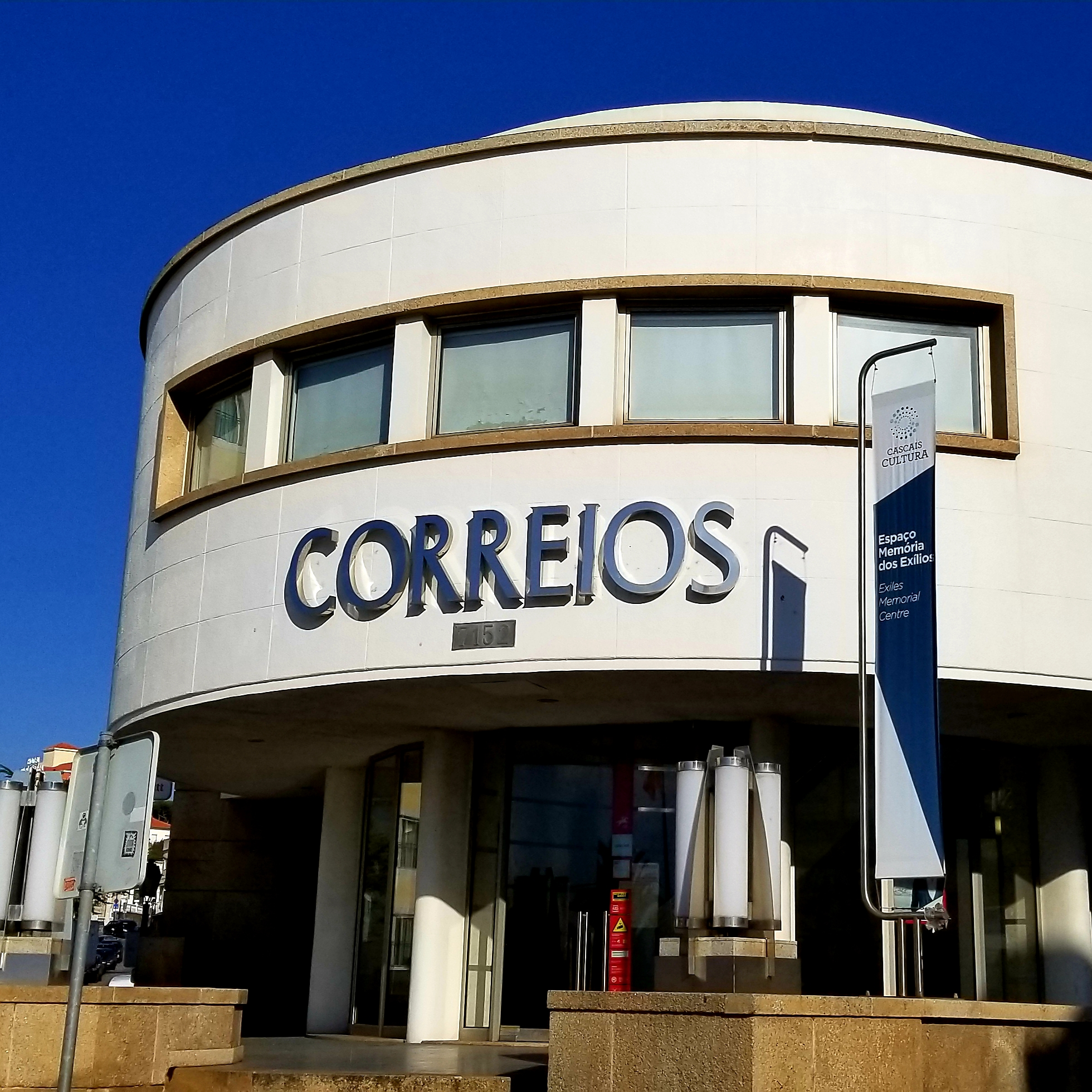
Exiles Memorial Center

Gardens at the Palace of the Marquês de Pombal

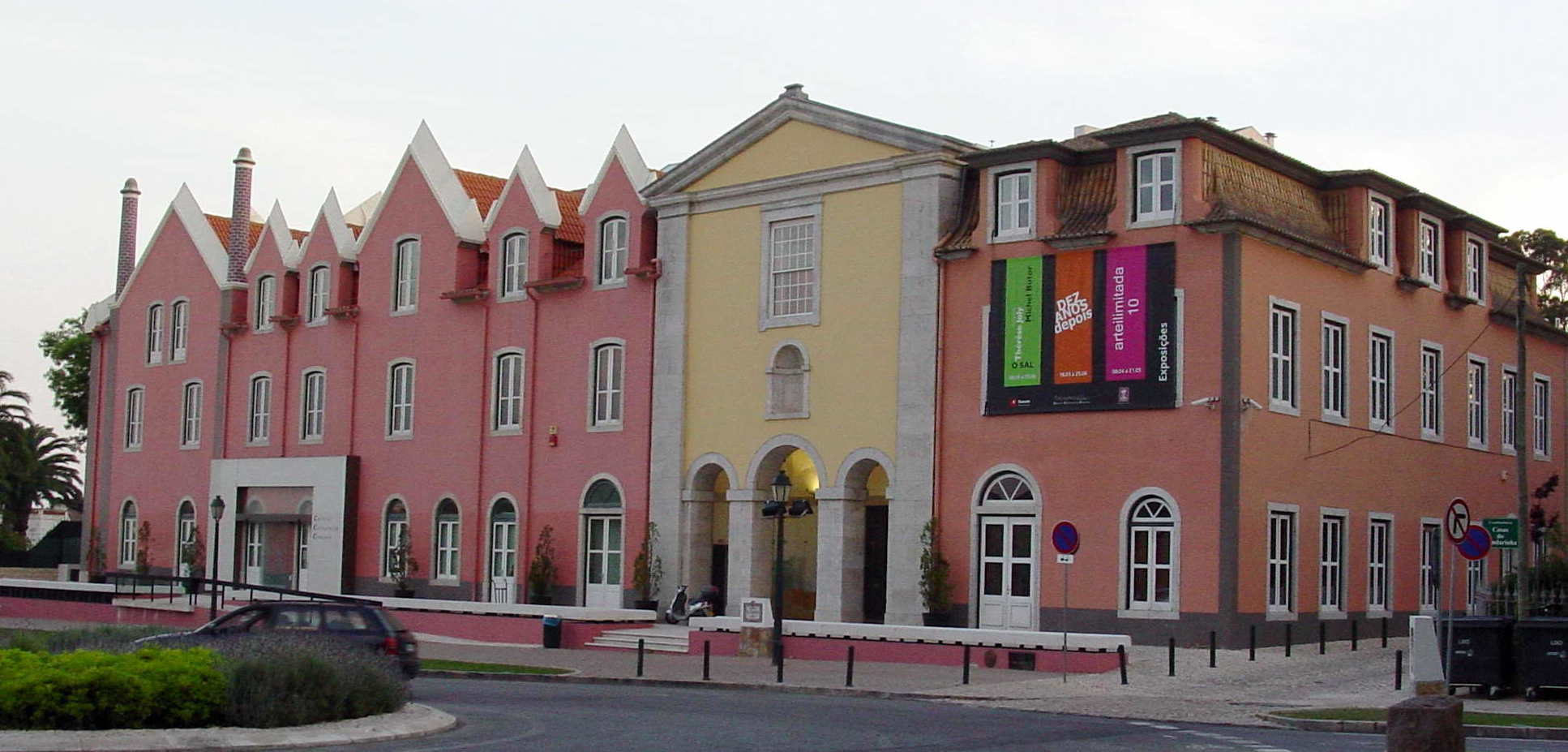
King Luís I Foundation & Cultural Center

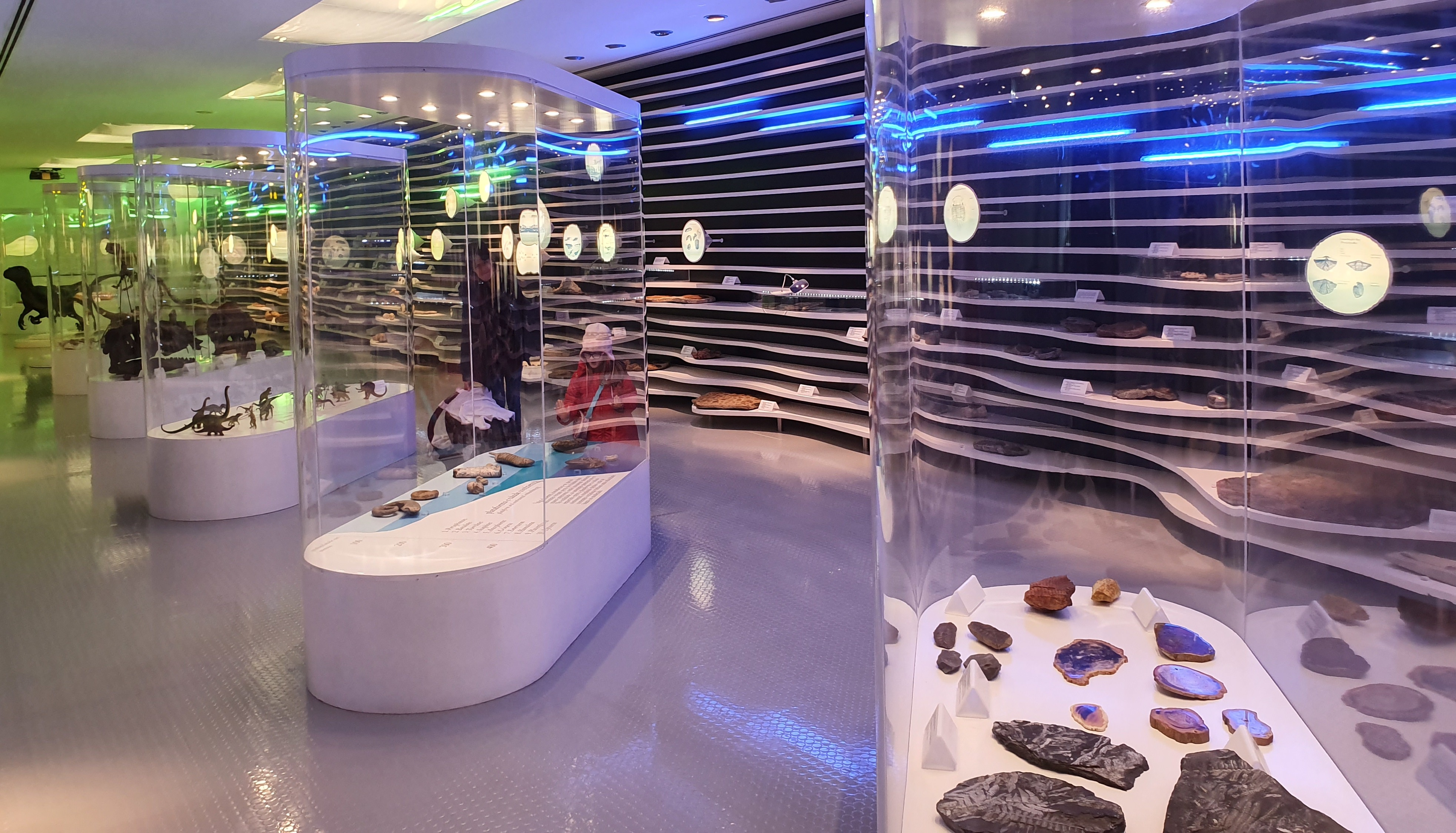
Sintra Natural History Museum

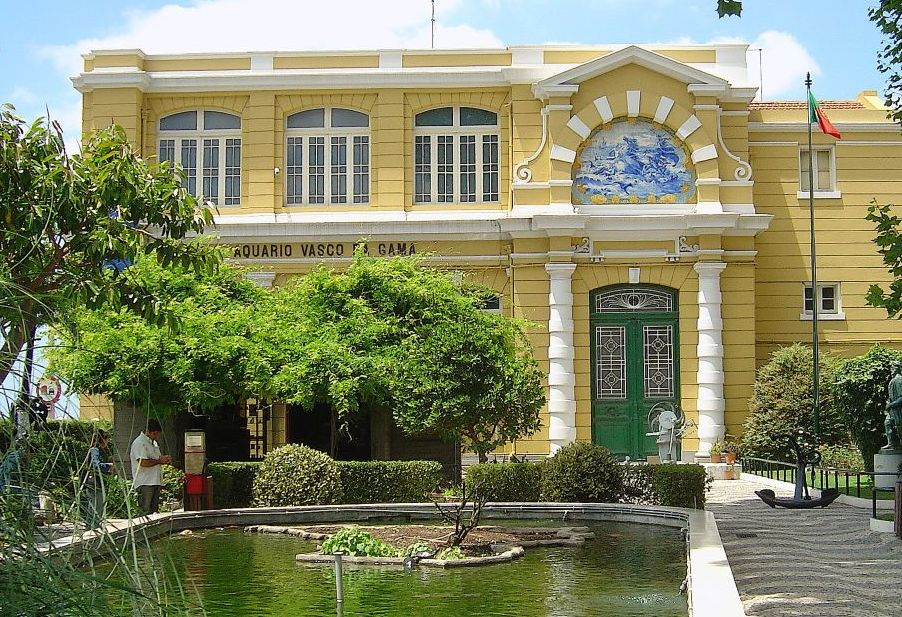
Aquário Vasco da Gama

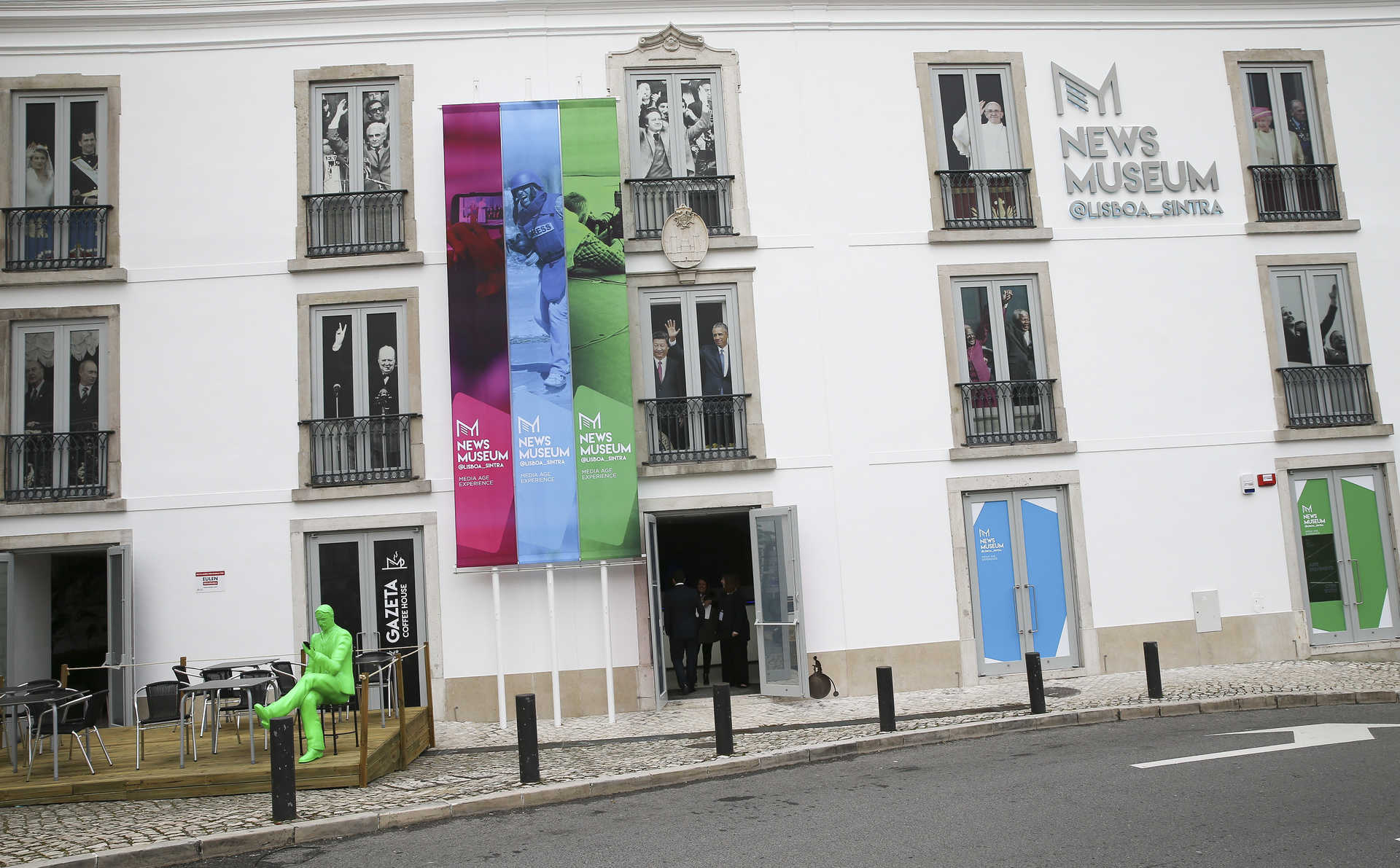
NewsMuseum

=== Events and festivals ===
==== Summits ====
- Bilderberg Meeting (1999)
- Horasis Global Meeting (since 2017)

==== Music ====
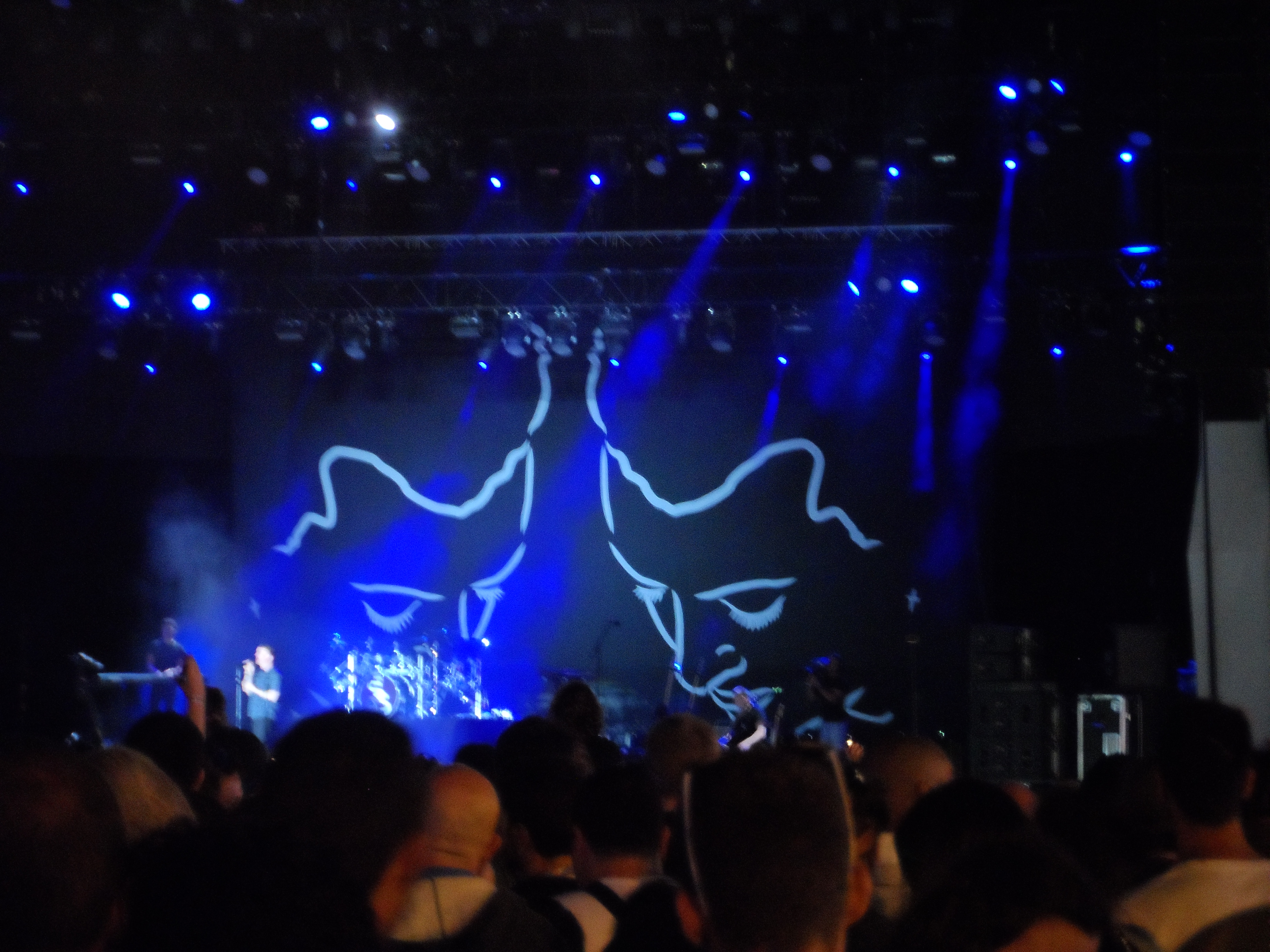
Sam Smith performing at NOS Alive Music Festival 2015, in Oeiras.

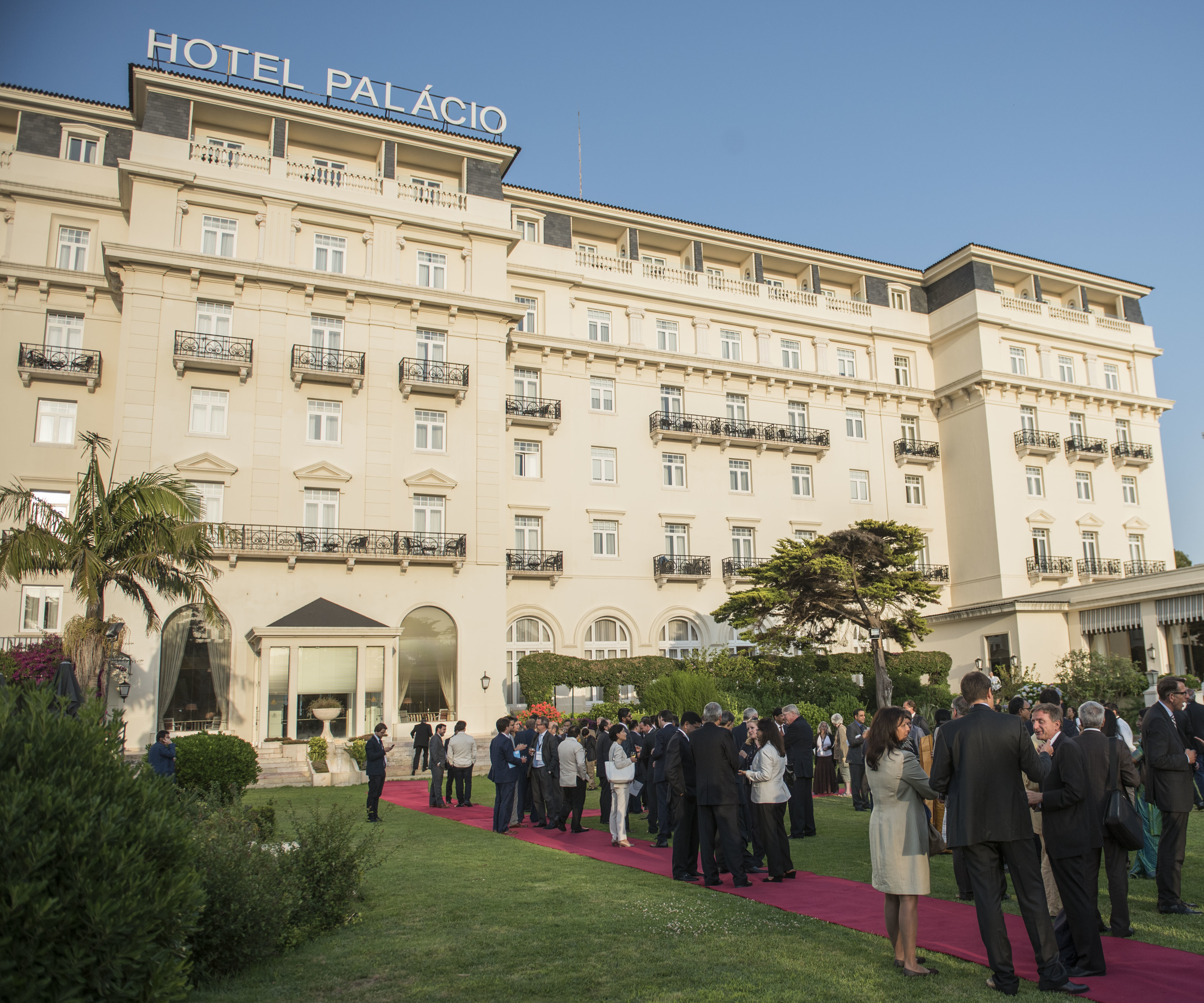
2017 Horasis Global Meeting reception at the Hotel Palácio in Estoril.

- Cascais Jazz Festival
- NOS Alive (since 2007)
- Super Bock Super Rock (since 1994)
- Festas do Mar (since 1965)
- Estoril Jazz Festival (Festival de Jazz do Estoril; since 1971)
- Estoril Festival (Festival do Estoril; since 1975)
- Musa Cascais Festival (since 1999)
- EDP Cool Jazz (since 2013)

==== Film ====
- Lisbon & Estoril Film Festival (since 2007)

==== Sporting ====
- America's Cup (2011)
- Estoril Tennis Open (since 2015)
- Estoril Golf Open (only 1999)
- Estoril Challenge de Portugal (1997–2007)
- Ironman 70.3 (since 2017)
- Portuguese Open (1953–2010)
- Star World Championships (1948, 1952, 1954, 1962, 2007)
- 4 Hours of Estoril (since 1997)
- Portuguese Grand Prix (since 1951)
- Portuguese motorcycle Grand Prix (since 1987)

== Notable residents ==
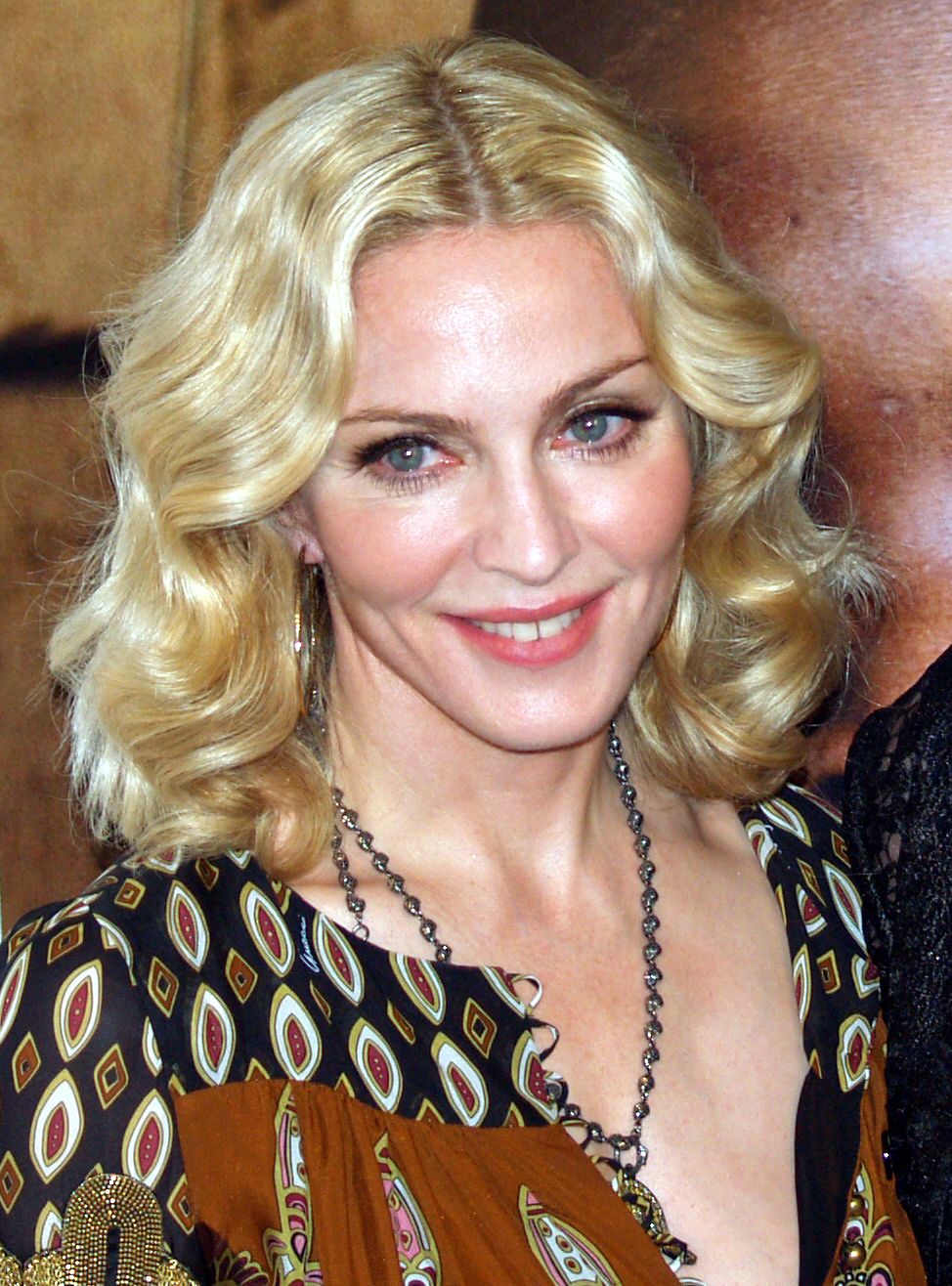
Madonna, world-known international pop star.

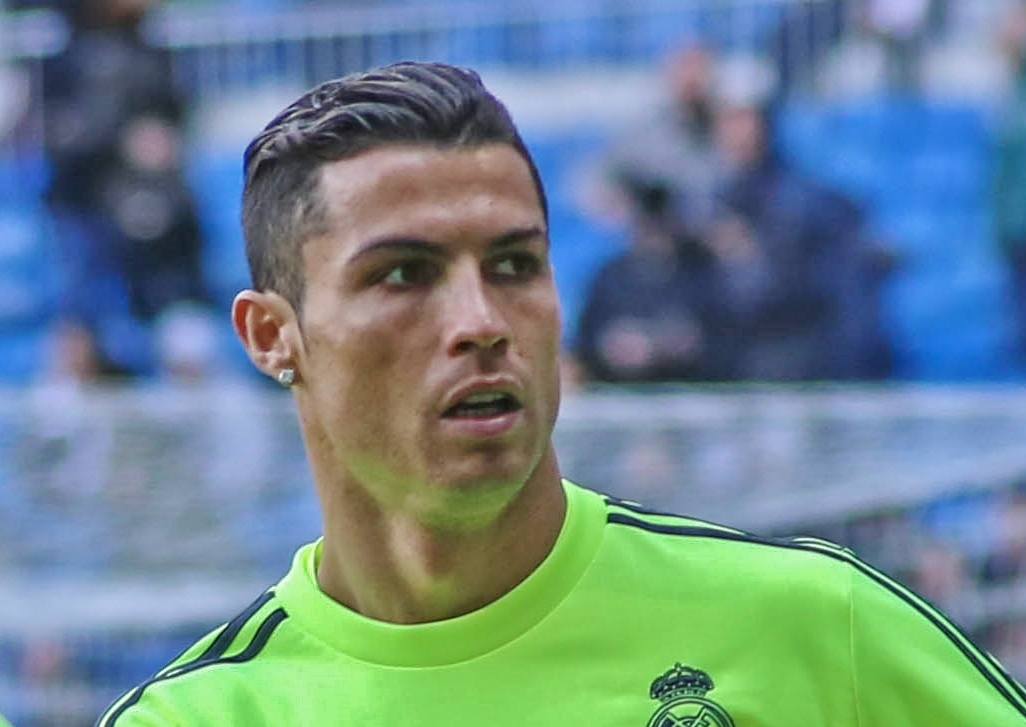
Cristiano Ronaldo, Portuguese footballer.

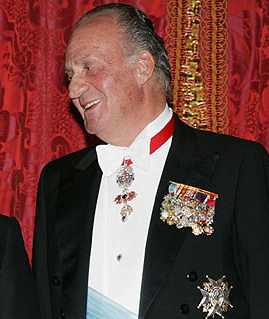
King Juan Carlos I of Spain.

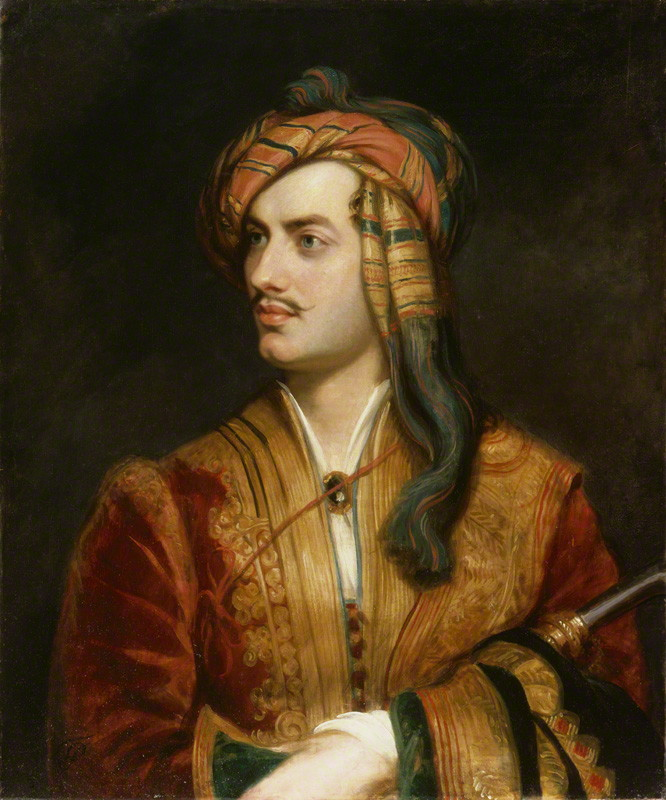
Lord Byron, famed British poet and leading Romanticist figure.

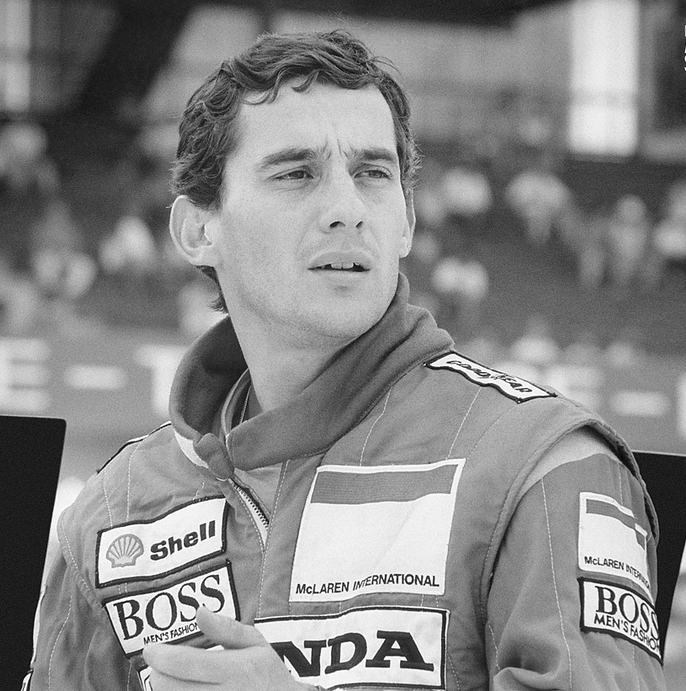
Ayrton Senna, Brazilian racer considered to be one of the best Formula One drivers of all time.

=== Royalty and nobility ===
- King Juan Carlos I of Spain (Spain)
- King Umberto II of Italy ( (Kingdom of Italy) Italy)
- King Carol II of Romania (Romania)
- Queen Marie-José of Belgium (Belgium)
- Princess Isabel of Orléans-Braganza ( (Empire of Brazil) Brazil)
- Henri (VI) d'Orléans, Count of Paris ( France)
- Henri (VII) d'Orléans, Count of Paris ( France)
- Princess Diane, Duchess of Württemberg ( France)
- Princess Anne, Duchess of Calabria ( France)
- Princess Claude of Orléans ( France)
- Archduke Joseph Francis of Austria ( (Austrian Empire) Austria)
- Archduke Joseph Árpád of Austria ( (Austrian Empire) Austria)
- Duarte Pio, Duke of Braganza ( (Kingdom of Portugal) Portugal)
- Isabel, Duchess of Braganza ( (Kingdom of Portugal) Portugal)
- Afonso, Prince of Beira ( (Kingdom of Portugal) Portugal)
- Infante Juan, Count of Barcelona (Spain)
- Infanta Pilar, Duchess of Badajoz (Spain)
- Infanta Margarita, Duchess of Soria (Spain)
- Infante Alfonso of Spain (Spain)
- Vittorio Emanuele, Prince of Naples ( (Kingdom of Italy) Italy)
- Princess Maria Beatrice of Savoy ( (Kingdom of Italy) Italy)
- Princess Maria Pia of Bourbon-Parma ( (Kingdom of Italy) Italy)
- Princess Maria Gabriella of Savoy ( (Kingdom of Italy) Italy)
- Queen Giovanna of Bulgaria ( (Tsardom of Bulgaria (1908–1946)) Bulgaria)
- Princess Anna of Saxony ( (Kingdom of Saxony) Saxony)
- Princess María de las Mercedes of Bourbon-Two Sicilies ( (Kingdom of the Two Sicilies) Sicily)
- Princess Magda of Hohenzollern-Sigmaringen ( Romania)
- Miklós Horthy, Regent of Hungary ( (Kingdom of Hungary) Hungary)

=== Celebrities ===
- Ana Free, Portuguese singer
- Annabelle Wallis, English actress
- Aure Atika, French actress and director
- Chabeli Iglesias, Spanish socialite
- Daniela Ruah, Portuguese actress
- Jack Glatzer, American violinist
- Kristoffer Rygg, Norwegian producer
- Luana Piovani, Brazilian supermodel
- Madonna, American pop star
- Mariana van Zeller, Portuguese journalist
- Mia Rose, Portuguese singer
- Nadir Afonso, Portuguese architect
- Paula Rego, Portuguese artist
- Philippe Starck, French designer
- Rita Pereira, Portuguese actress

=== Athletes ===
- Cristiano Ronaldo, Portuguese footballer
- Magali de Lattre, Swiss tennis player
- Eric Dier, English footballer
- Iker Casillas, Spanish footballer
- Afonso Taira, Portuguese footballer
- Kasper Schmeichel, Danish footballer
- António Félix da Costa, Portuguese racecar driver
- Luka Zahović, Slovenian footballer
- Paulo Ferreira, Portuguese footballer
- Duarte Tammilehto, Finnish footballer
- Nuno Gomes, Portuguese footballer

=== Politicians ===
- Marcelo Rebelo de Sousa, former President of Portugal
- Francisco Pinto Balsemão, former Portuguese prime minister
- Fulgencio Batista, former President of Cuba

=== Historical figures ===
- Lord Byron, British Romanticist poet
- Tennessee Claflin, first American woman to run a Wall Street firm
- Christopher Isherwood, British-American novelist
- Glauber Rocha, Brazilian Cinema Novo film director
- Adrian Conan Doyle, British heir and playboy
- Roy Campbell, South African poet
- Gloria Swanson, American silent film actress
- Ayrton Senna, Brazilian racecar driver

== Gallery ==
Statue of King Carlos I of Portugal in front of Cascais Citadel

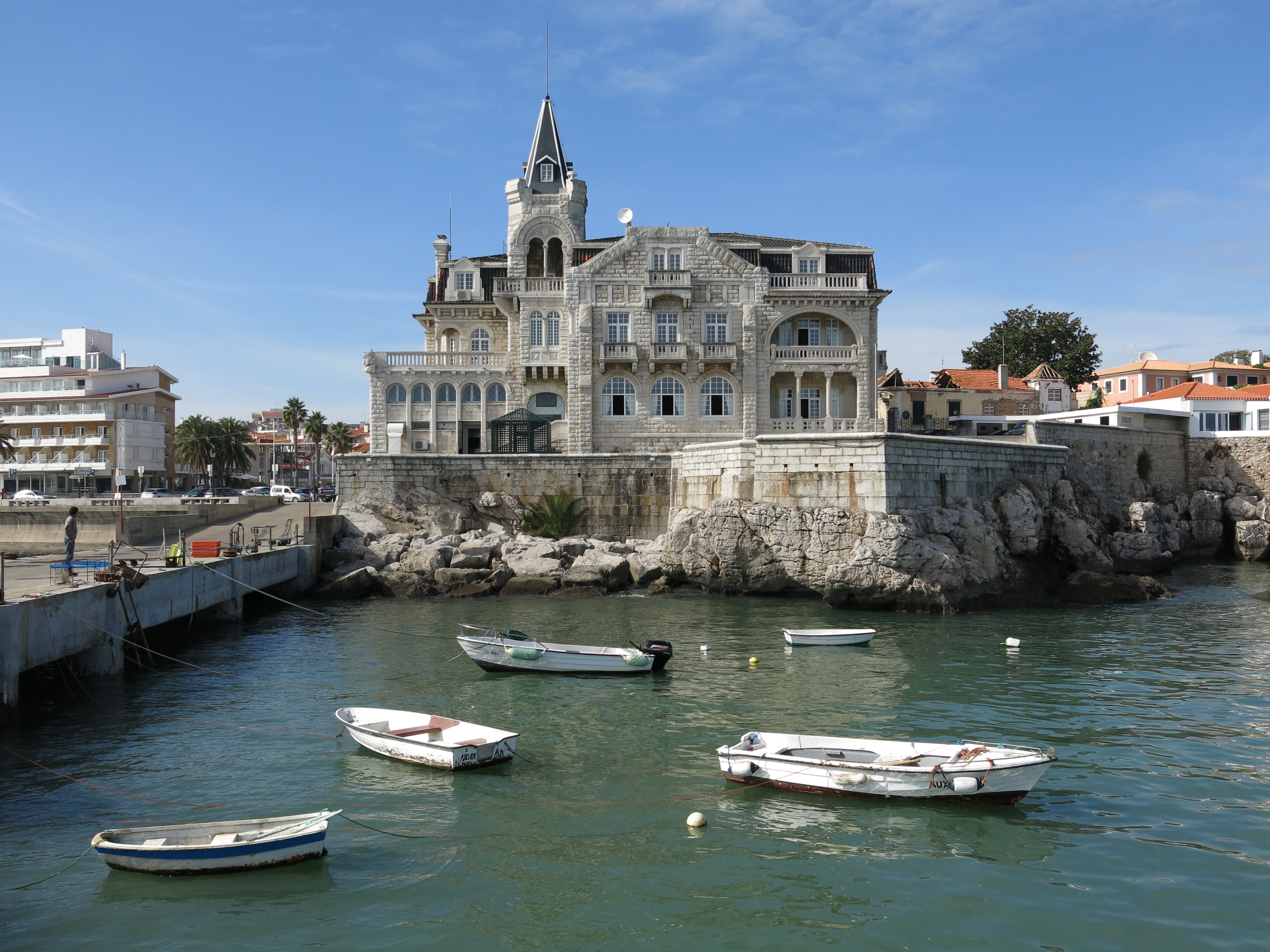
Seixas Palace

Palace of the Counts of Castro Guimarães, in Cascais

Casa das Histórias Paula Rego, designed by Eduardo Souto de Moura

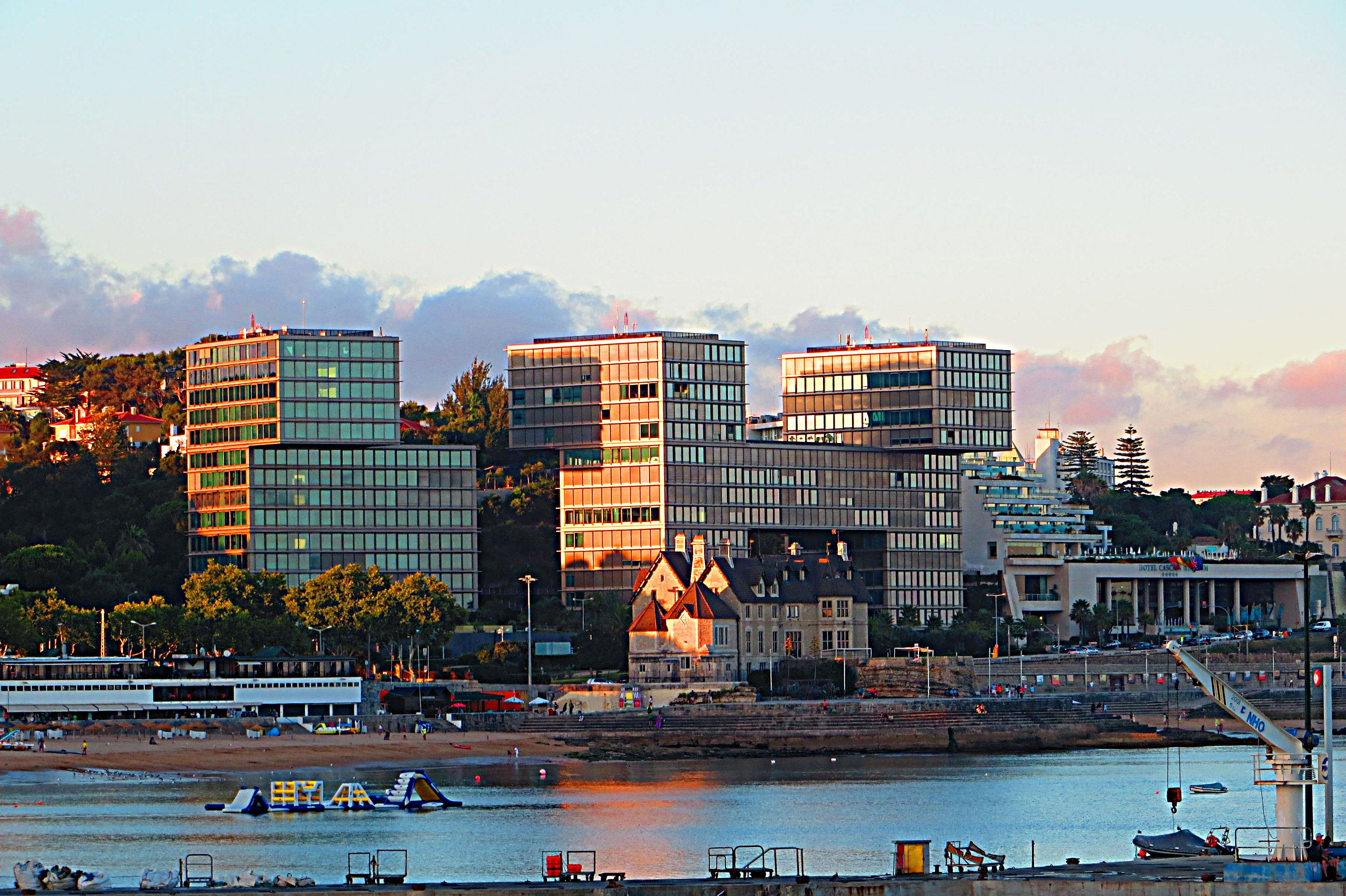
Estoril Sol Residence

Robillon Pavilion of Queluz National Palace

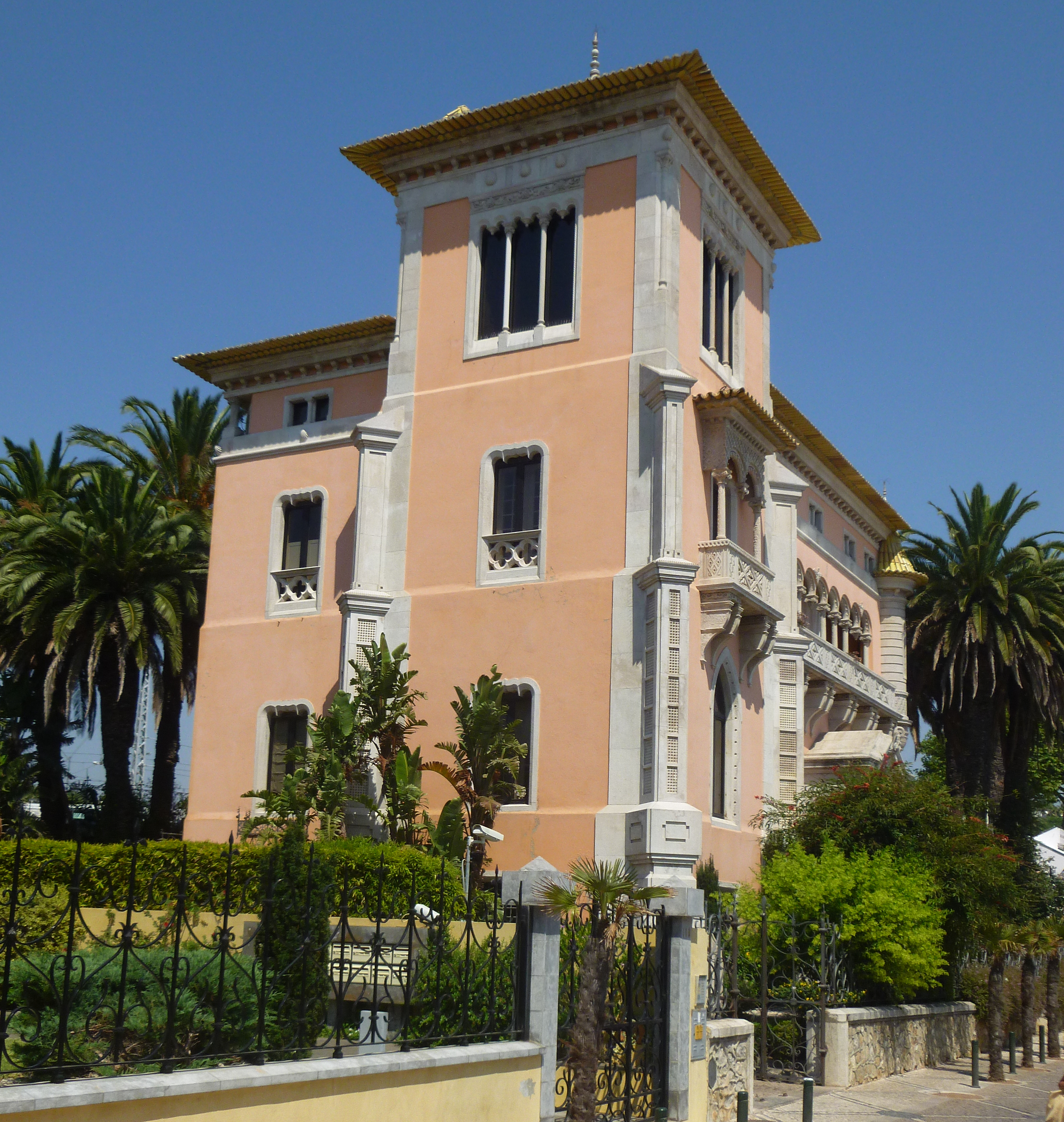
Casa D. António de Lencastre

Tamariz Beach in Estoril

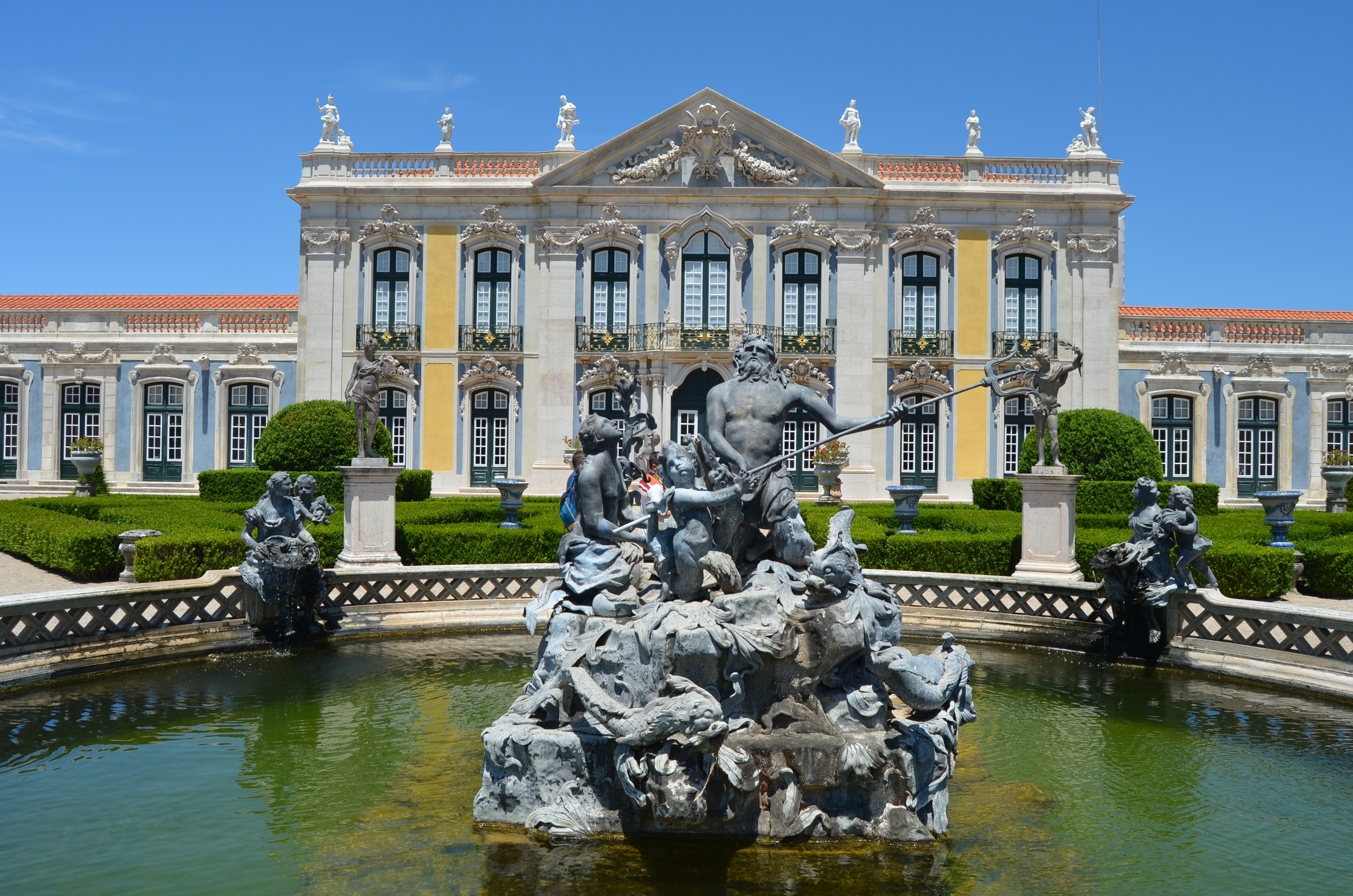
Queluz National Palace in Sintra

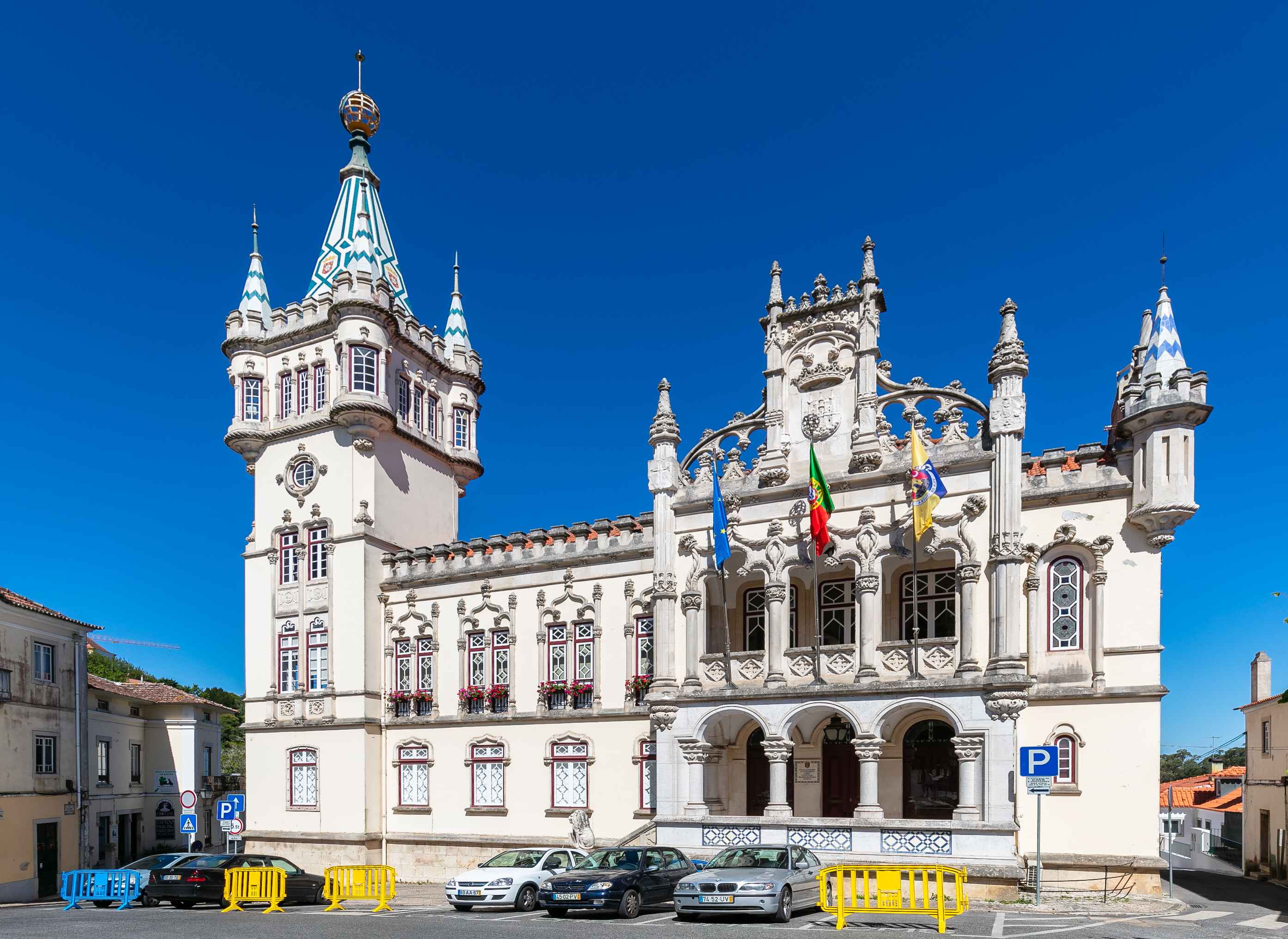
Sintra City Hall

Quinta da Regaleira in the Sintra Mountains

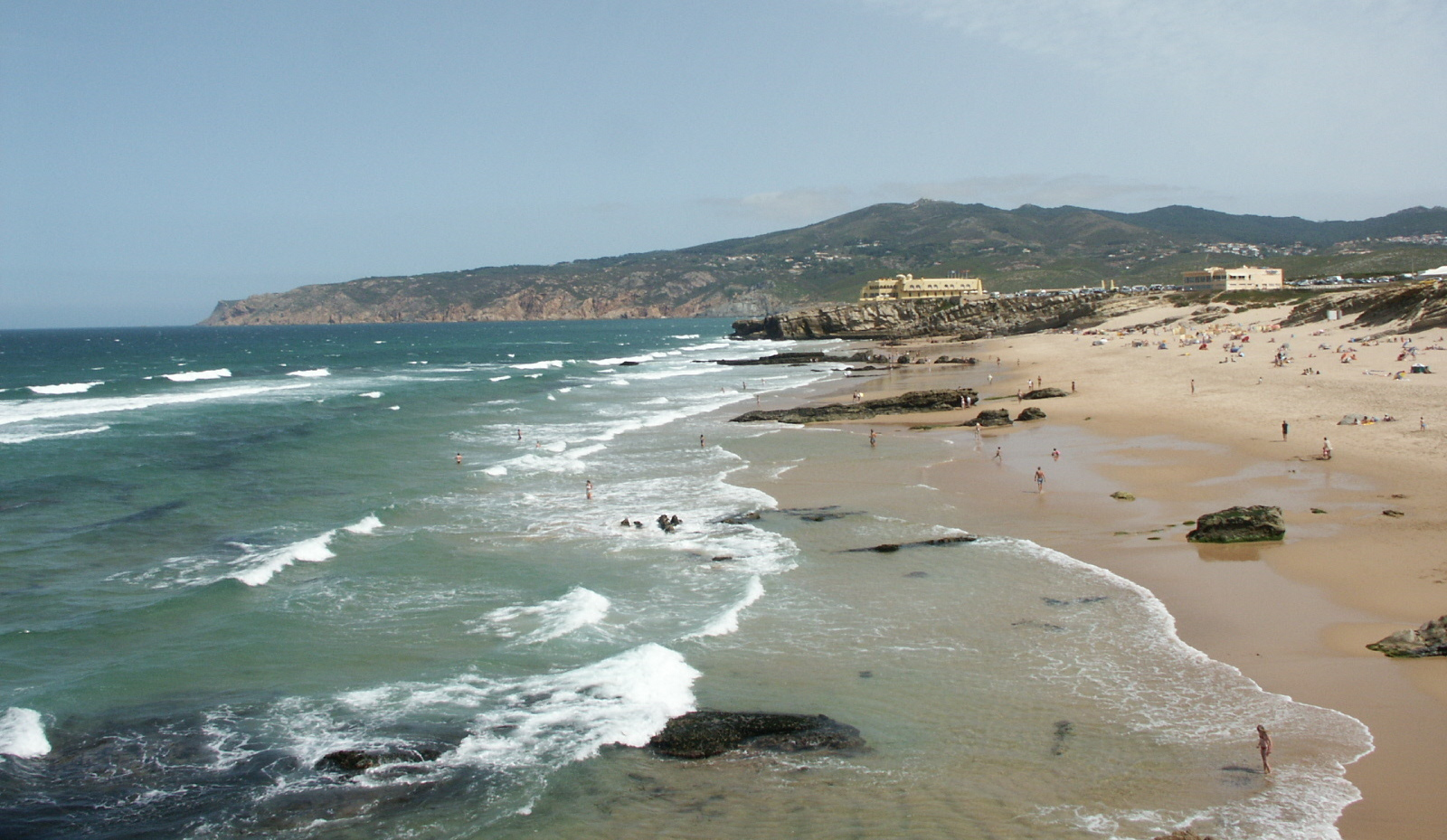
Praia do Guincho

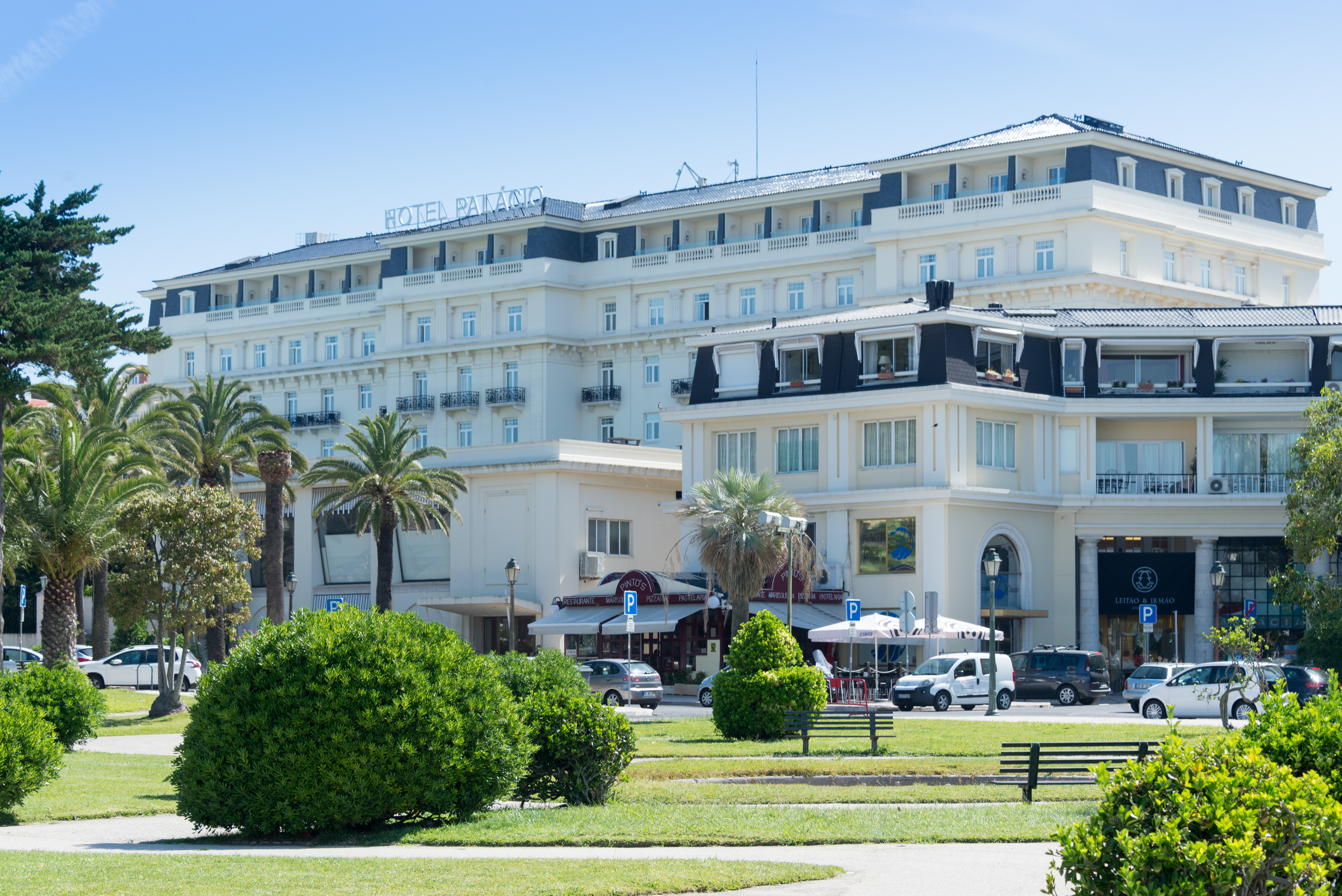
Hotel Palácio in Estoril

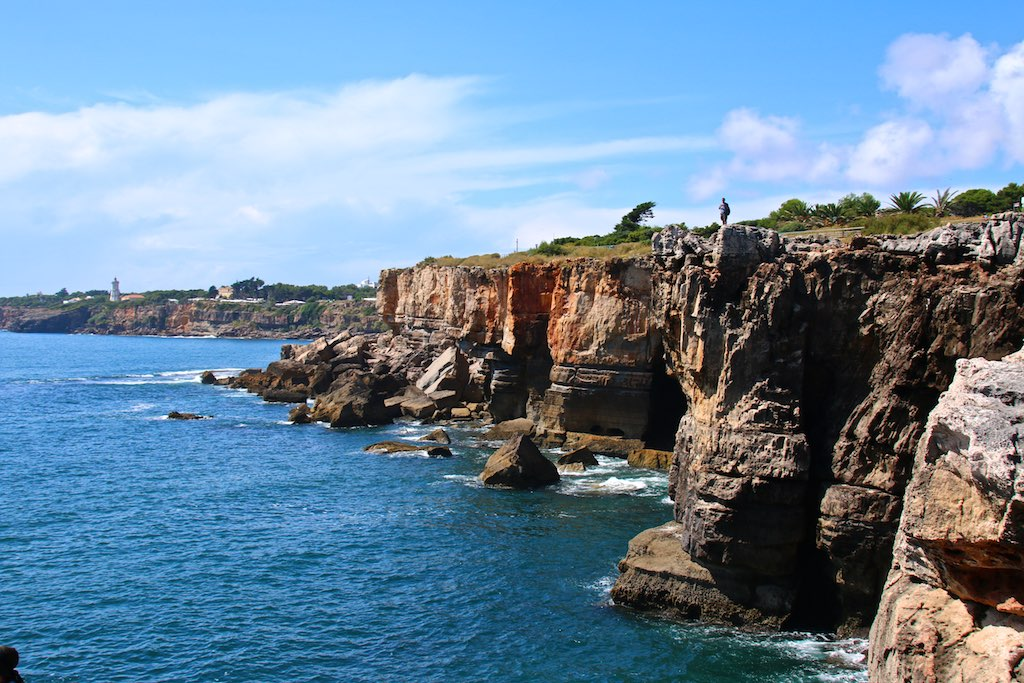
Cliffs along the coast of Estoril

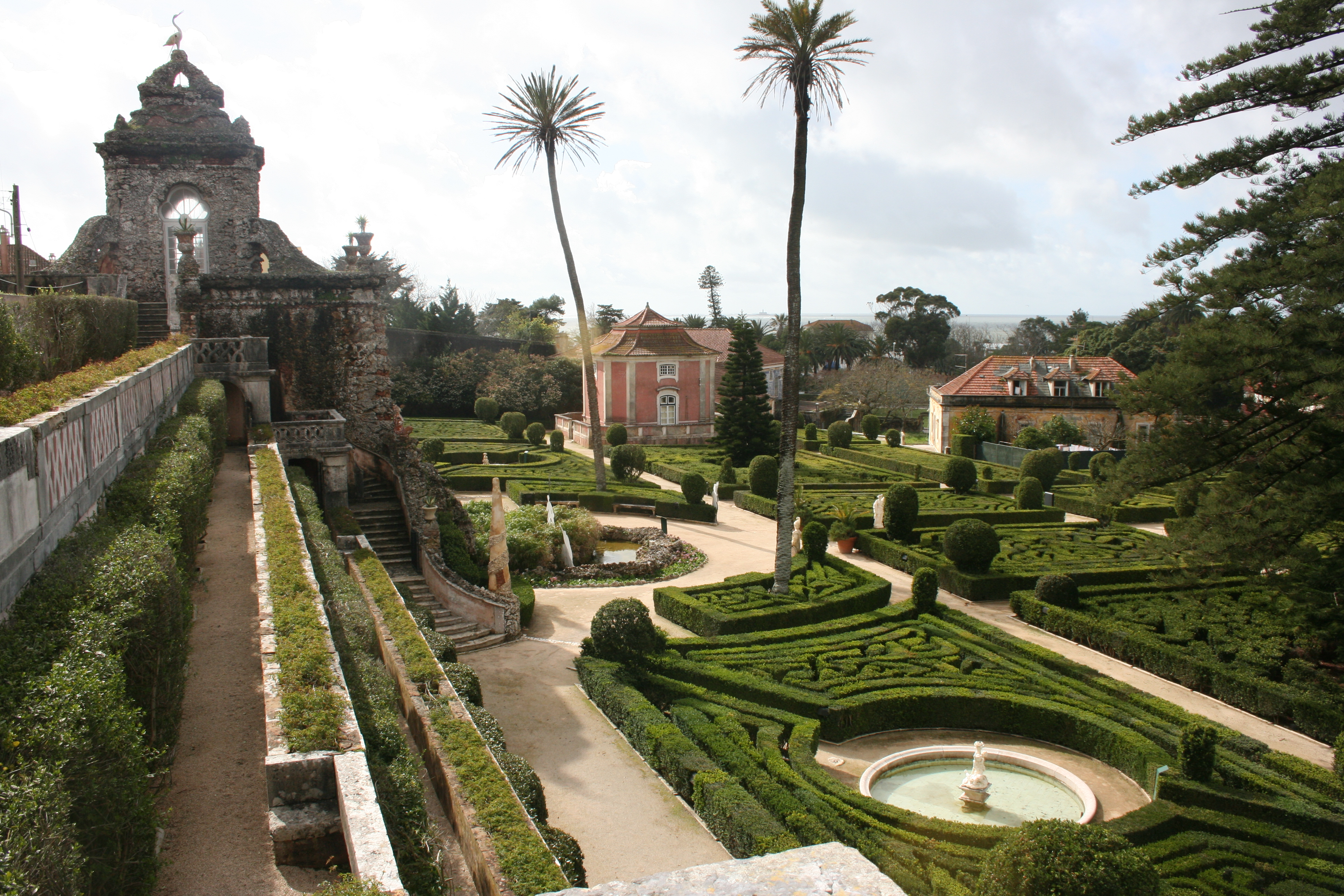
Gardens of the Royal Quinta in Caxias

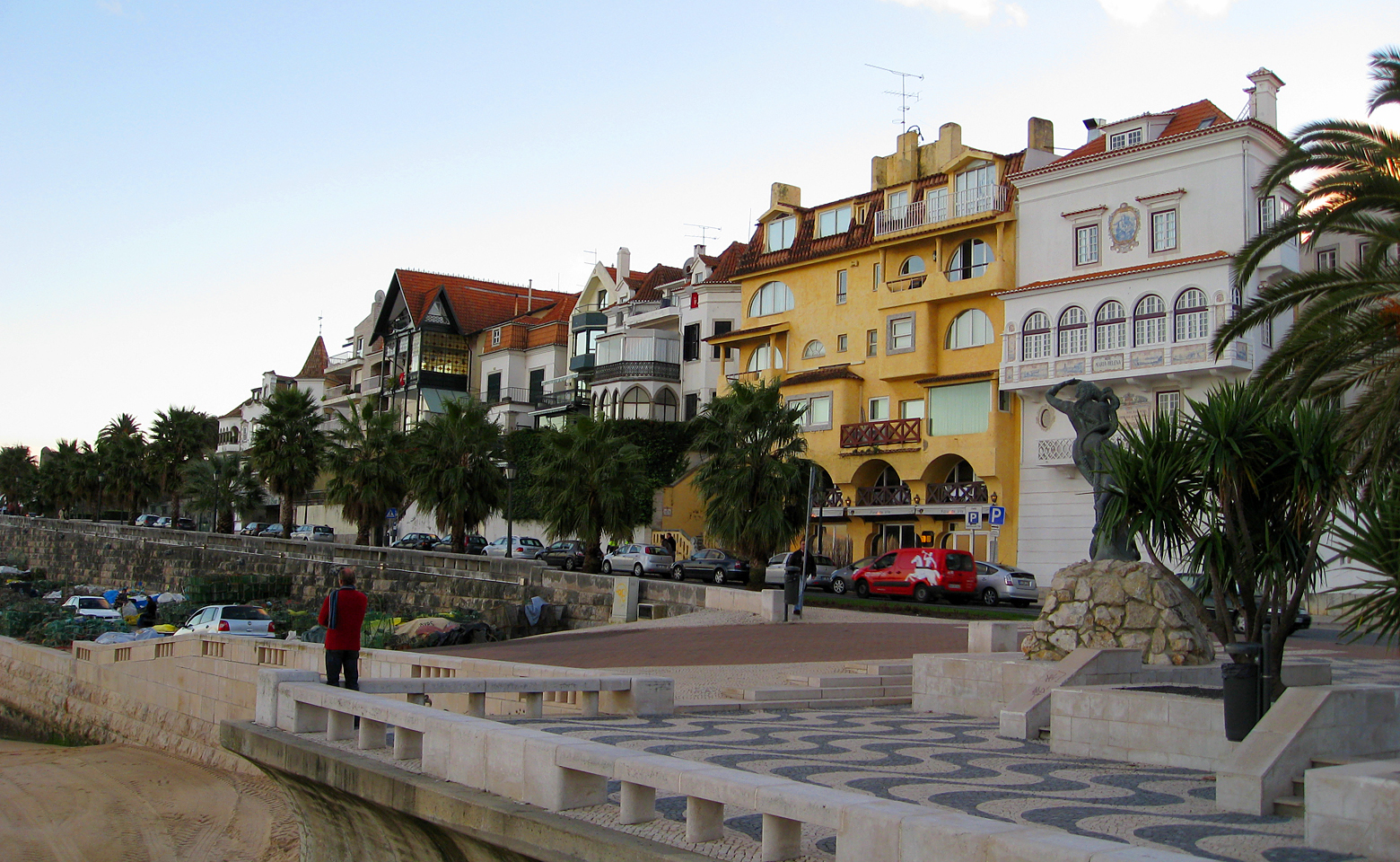
King Carlos I Avenue in Cascais

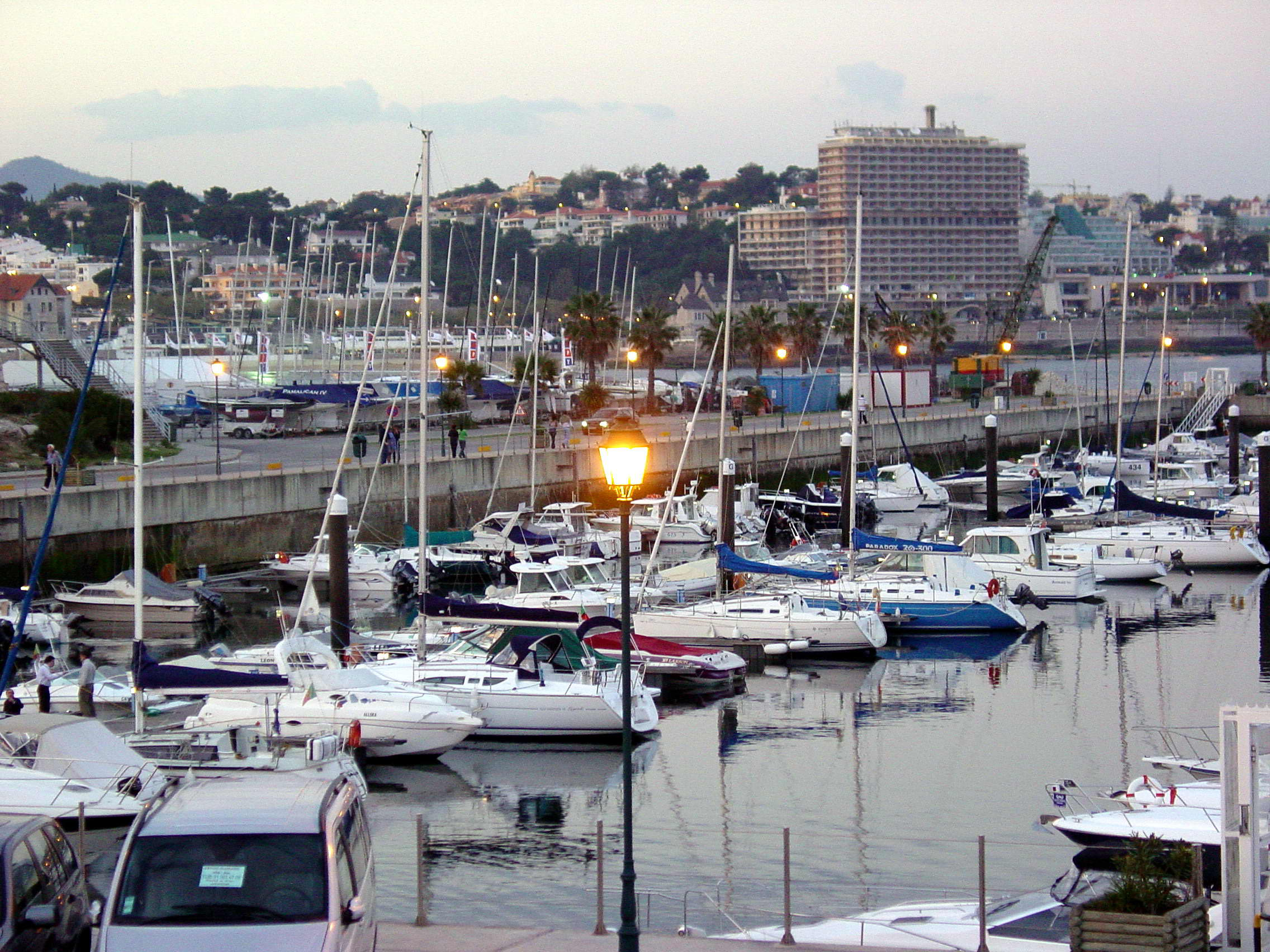
Cascais Marina

== See also ==
- French Riviera
- Italian Riviera
- Tourism in Portugal
- Comporta

== Bibliography ==
- Bloch, Michael (1982). The Duke of Windsor's War. London: Weidenfeld and Nicolson. ISBN 0-297-77947-8.
