= Quinta da Regaleira =

Culture heritage estate near Sintra, Portugal

General information
- Location: Sintra, Portugal

UNESCO World Heritage Site
- Part of: Cultural Landscape of Sintra
- Criteria: Cultural: (ii), (iv), (v)
- Reference: 723
- Inscription: 1995 (19th Session)

Portuguese National Monument
- Type: Non-movable
- Criteria: Monument of Public Interest
- Designated: 19 February 2002
- Reference no.: IPA.00006705

Quinta da Regaleira [ˈkĩtɐ ðɐ ˈʁɨɣɐlɐjɾɐ] is a quinta (manor house) constructed from 1904 to '10 and located near the historic centre of Sintra, Portugal. It is classified as a World Heritage Site by UNESCO within the "Cultural Landscape of Sintra". Along with the other palaces in the area such as the Quinta do Relógio, Pena, Monserrate and Seteais palaces, it is considered one of the principal tourist attractions of Sintra.

The property consists of a Romantic palace and chapel, and a luxurious park that features lakes, grottoes, wells, benches, fountains, and a vast array of exquisite constructions. The palace is also known as "The Palace of Monteiro the Millionaire", which is based on the nickname of its best known former owner, António Augusto Carvalho Monteiro. The palace was designed by the Italian architect Luigi Manini.

== History ==
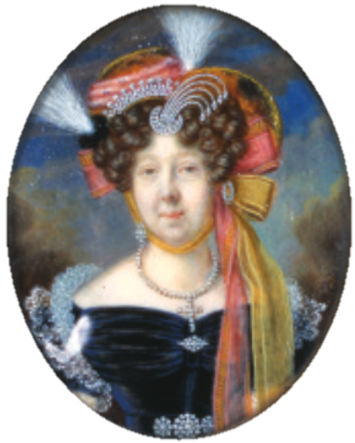
D. Ermelinda Monteiro de Almeida, Viscountess of Regaleira.

The land that is now Quinta da Regaleira had many owners over the years. It belonged to the Viscountess of Regaleira, a family of wealthy merchants from Porto, when it was sold in 1892 to Carvalho Monteiro for 25,000 réis. Monteiro was eager to build a bewildering place where he could collect symbols that reflected his interests and ideologies. With the assistance of the Italian architect Luigi Manini, he recreated the 4-hectare estate.

In addition to other new features, he added enigmatic buildings that allegedly held symbols related to alchemy, Masonry, the Knights Templar, and the Rosicrucians. The architecture Manini designed evoked Roman, Gothic, Renaissance, and Manueline styles. The construction of the current estate commenced in 1904 and much of it was completed by 1910.

The estate was later sold in 1942 to Waldemar d'Orey, who used it as private residence for his extensive family. He ordered repairs and restoration work for the property. In 1987, the estate was sold, once again, to the Japanese Aoki Corporation and ceased to serve as a residence. The corporation kept the estate closed to the public for ten years, until it was acquired by the Sintra Town Council in 1997. Extensive restoration efforts were promptly initiated throughout the estate. It finally opened to the public in June 1998 and began hosting cultural events. In August of that same year, the Portuguese Ministry of Culture classified the estate as "public interest property".

== Palace ==
Aerial view of the Quinta da Regaleira palace surrounded by dense forest in Sintra.

The Regaleira Palace (Portuguese: Palácio da Regaleira) bears the same name as the entire estate. The structure's façade is characterised by exuberantly Gothic pinnacles, gargoyles, capitals, and an impressive octagonal tower.

The palace contains five floors (a ground floor, three upper floors, and a basement). The ground floor consists of a series of hallways that all connect the living room, dining room, billiards room, balcony, some smaller rooms, and several stairways. In turn, the first upper floor contains bedrooms and a dressing room. The second upper floor contains Carvalho Monteiro's office, and the bedrooms of female servants. The third upper floor contains the ironing room and a smaller room with access to a terrace. Finally, the basement contains the male servants' bedrooms, the kitchen (which featured an elevator for lifting food to the ground floor), and storage rooms.

The main entrance and west façade of the palace.

Main entrance loggia.

The Loggia de Pisões along Rua Barbosa du Bocage.

Azulejo tilework depicting a royal hunting scene beneath the colonnade of the Loggia de Pisões.

The south façade of the palace.

Colonnade of the Loggia de Pisões on the palace terrace, featuring Neomanueline stone columns.

The balcony.

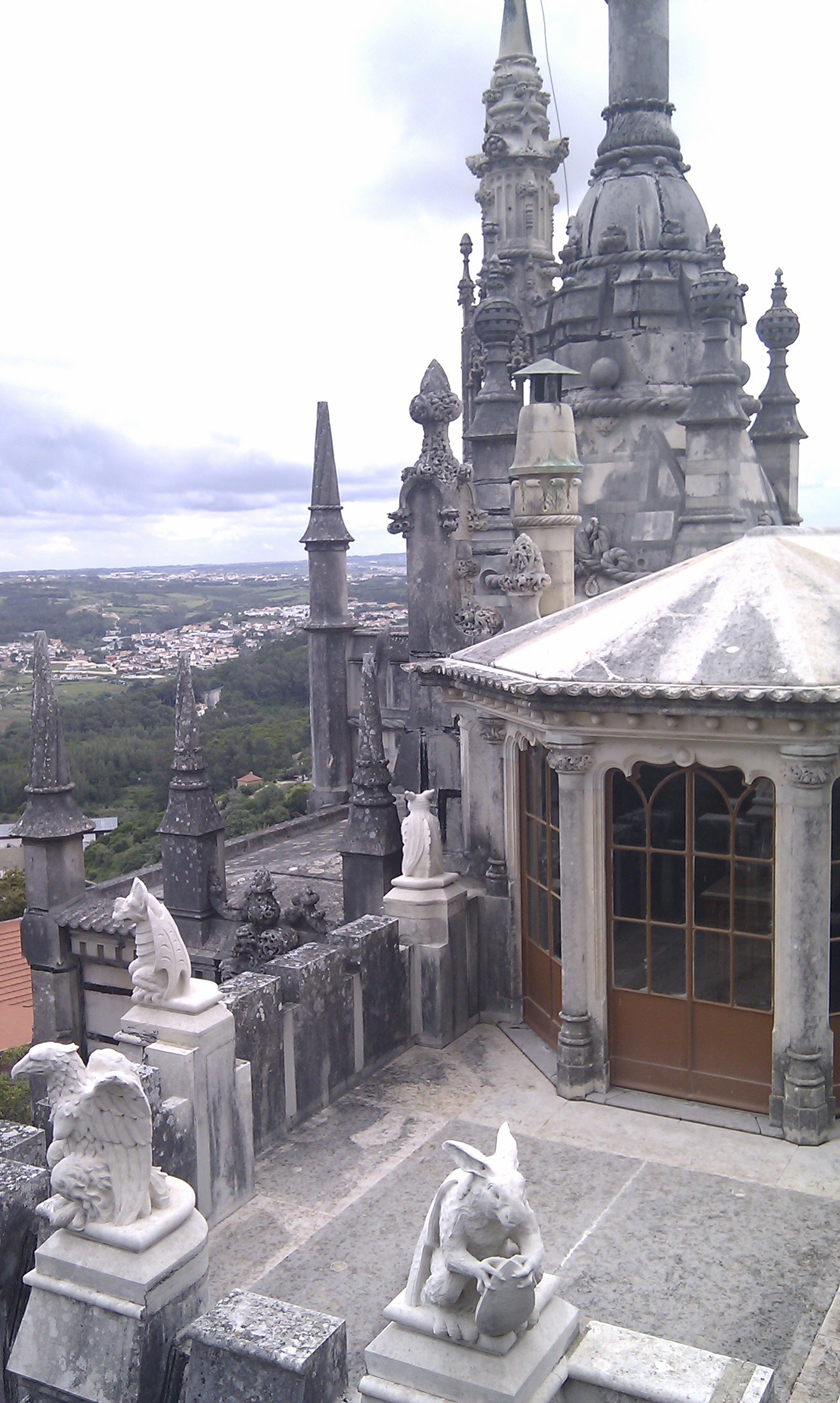
View from the roof or terrace of the palace

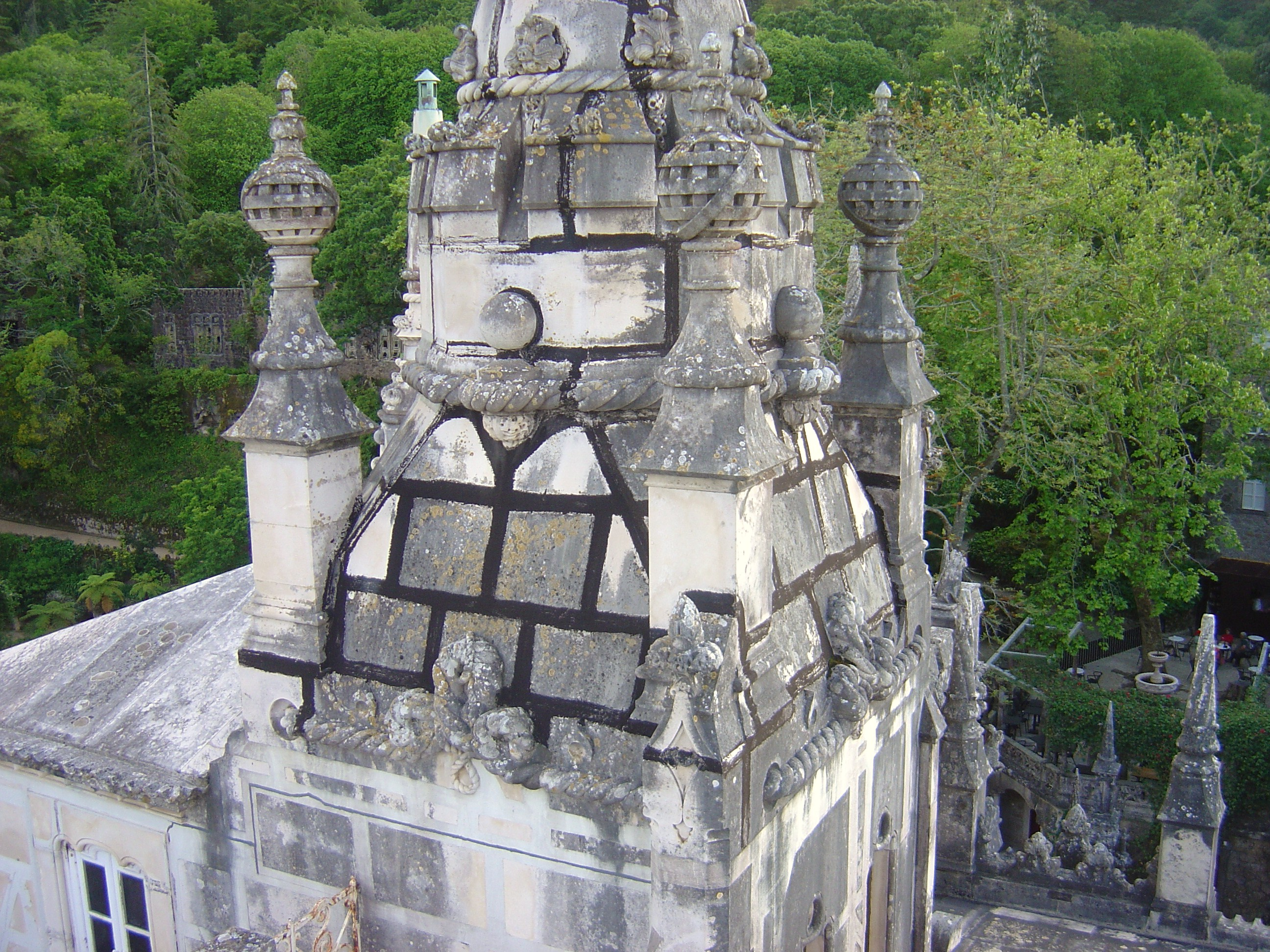
Turret with Manueline symbols alluding to the Portuguese discoveries.

Interior of the palace hallway featuring Renaissance architecture, with green walls decorated with Portuguese azulejos.

Portraits of Portuguese monarchs lining the upper walls of the Kings' Room (Sala dos Reis)

The Hunting Room (Sala da Caça), formerly the palace dining room.

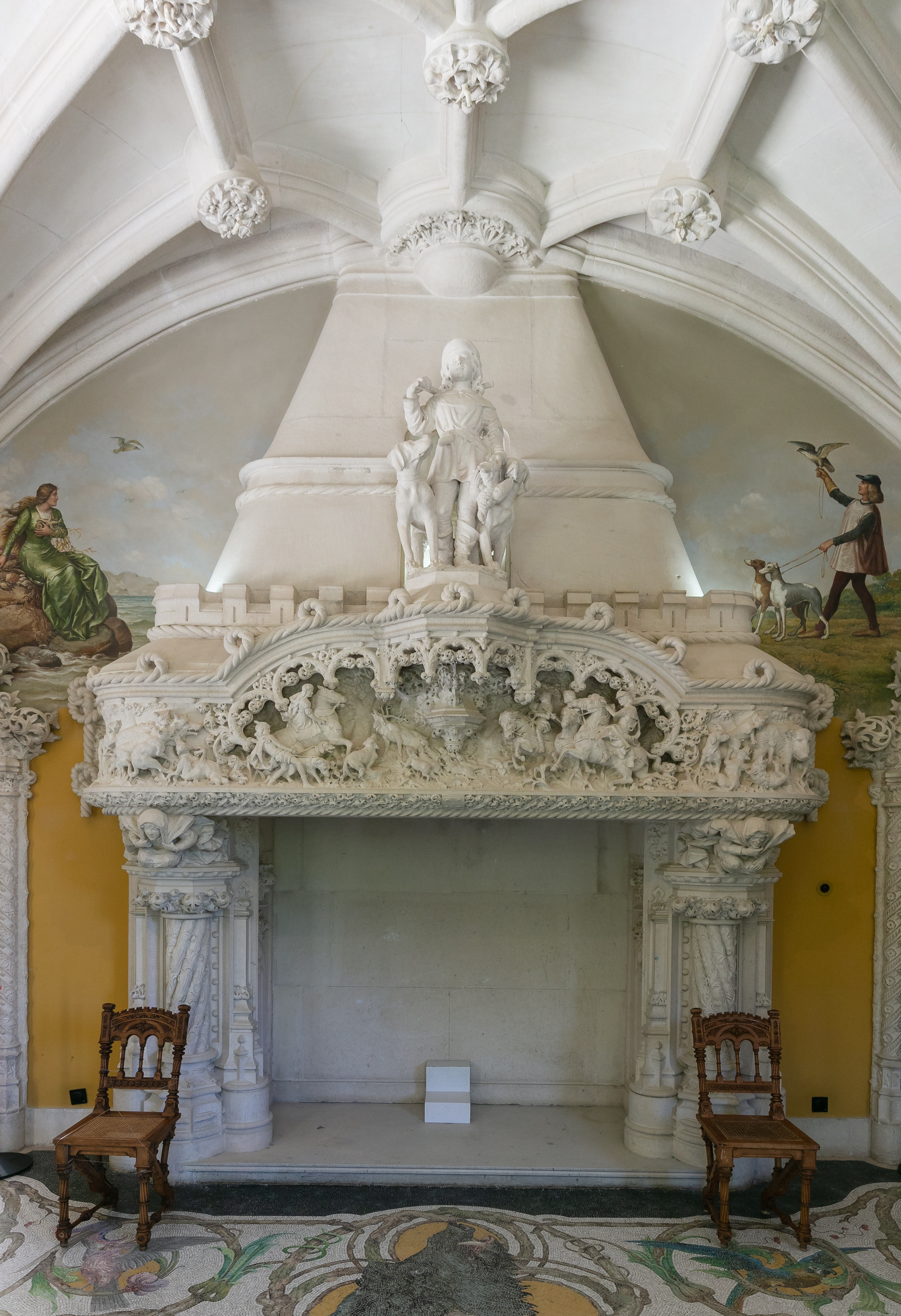
The fireplace in the dining room.

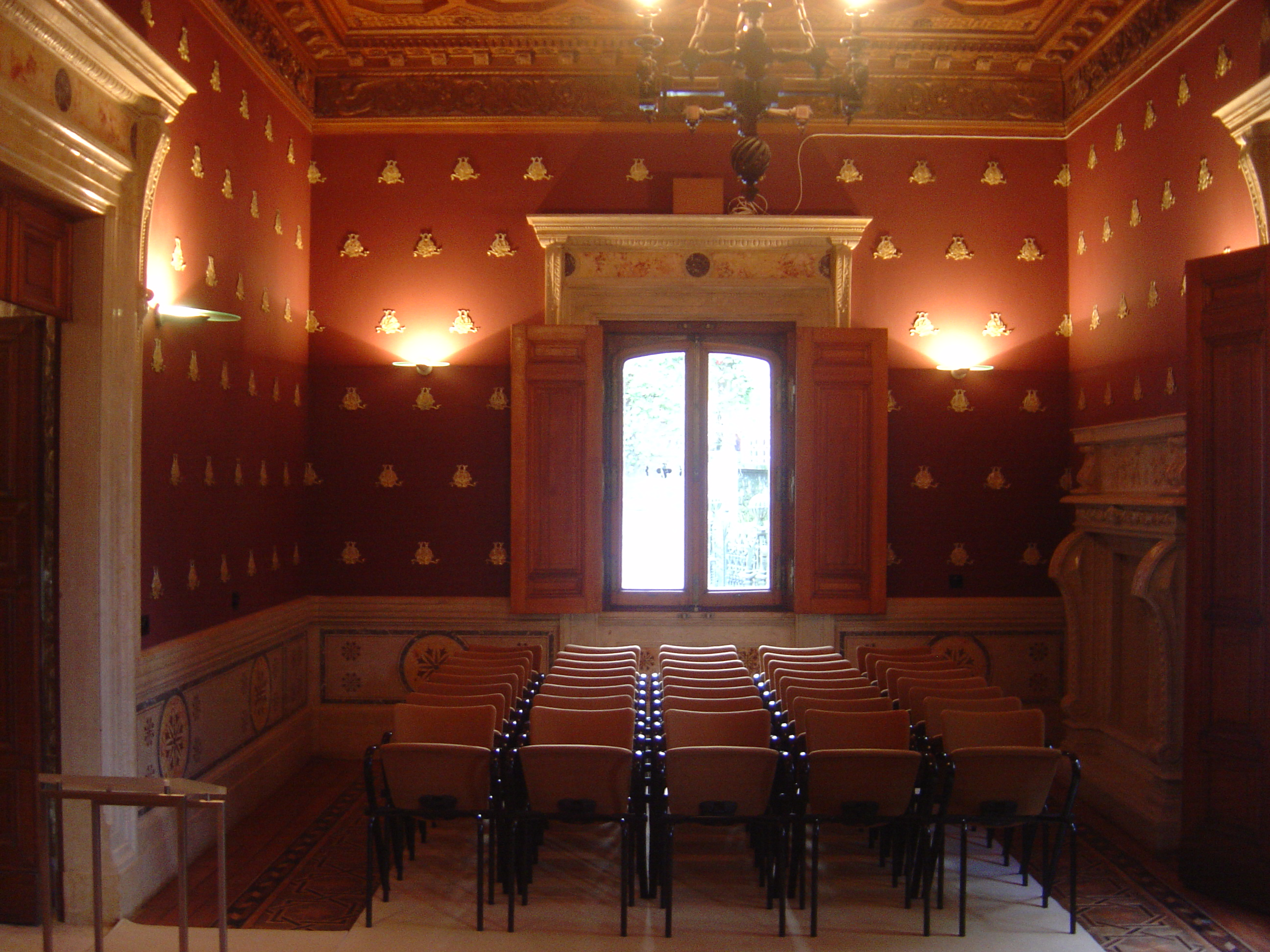
The living room.

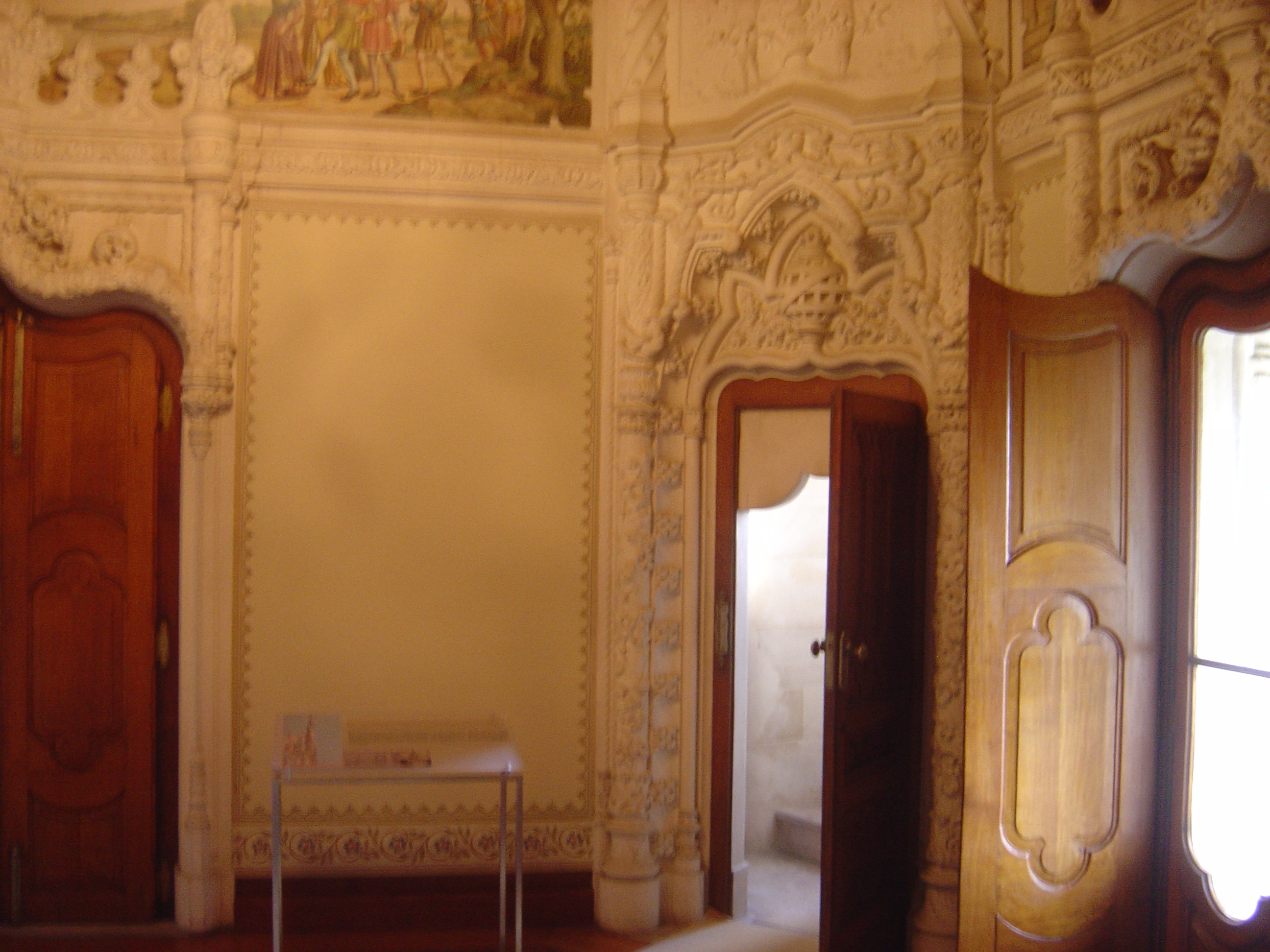
Entrance to the spiral stairwell.

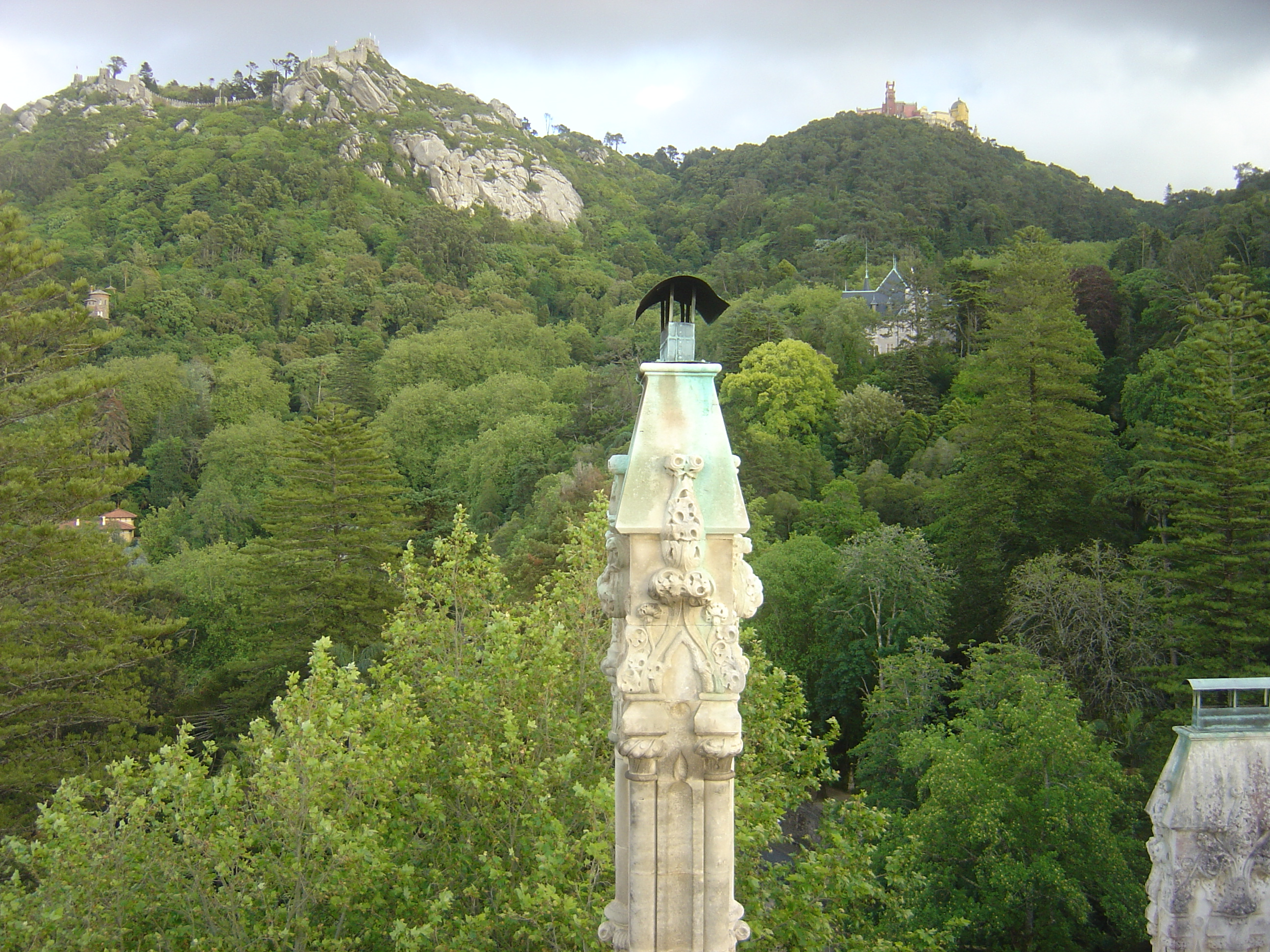
One of the chimneys. The Castle of the Moors and the Pena Palace are visible atop the hills.

== Chapel ==
The Regaleira Chapel (Capela da Santíssima Trindade) is a Roman Catholic chapel, and stands in front of the palace's main façade. Its architecture is akin to the palace's. The interior of the chapel is richly decorated with frescoes, stained glass windows and lavish stuccoes. The frescoes contain representations of Teresa of Ávila and Saint Anthony, as well as other religious depictions. Meanwhile, the floor itself offers depictions of the armillary sphere of the Portuguese discoveries and the Order of Christ Cross, surrounded by pentagrams. Despite its relatively small size, the chapel has several floors.

The Regaleira Chapel.

The chapel seen from above.

The main façade of the chapel.

The side entrance.

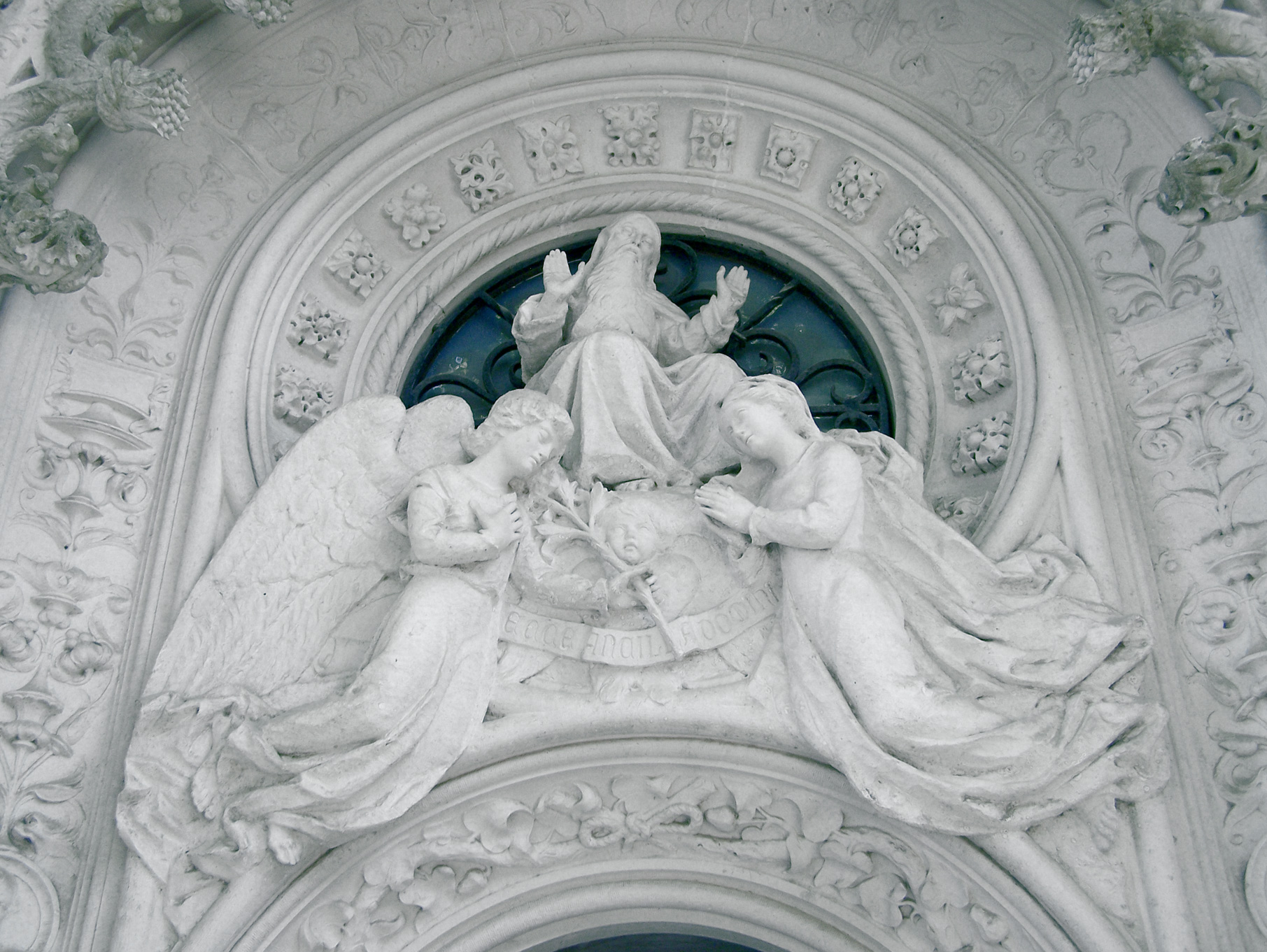
Stuccoes above the main entrance.

The interior of the chapel.

In the fresco above the altar, the resurrected Jesus Christ crowns the Virgin Mary.

Frescoes depicting Teresa of Ávila and Saint Anthony (during his "Sermon to the Fish", by Father António Vieira).

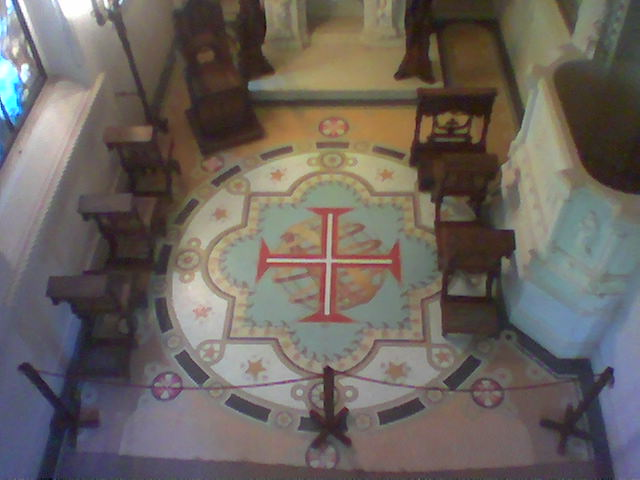
The floor: Order of Christ Cross over the armillary sphere.

== Park ==
Quinta da Regaleira Diagram. Legend: Buildings- A) Regaleira Palace; B) Regaleira Chapel; C) Greenhouse; D) Cultursintra Foundation offices; E) Coach Houses; F) Arts Workshop; K) Regaleira Tower; Open-air structures- G) Chimeras' Court; H) Loggia; I) Ibis Fountain; J) Fountain of Abundance; Fields- L) Terrace of the Celestial Worlds and Reservoir; M) Guardians' Entrance; N) Threshold of the Gods; O) Tennis Court; Others- 1) Main gate; 2) Secondary gate; 3) Upper gate; P) Aquarium; Q) Initiation Well; R) Unfinished Well; S) Labyrinthic Grotto; T) Leda's Grotto; W) Eastern Grotto; X) Grotto of the Virgin; Lakes- U) Unnamed Lake; V) Waterfall Lake;

Much of the four hectares of land in the surrounding estate consists of a densely treed park lined with myriad roads and footpaths. The woods are neatly arranged in the lower parts of the estate, but are left wild and disorganised in the upper parts, reflecting Carvalho Monteiro's belief in primitivism. Decorative, symbolic, and lively structures can be found throughout the park.

Gardens of the Quinta da Regaleira

Gazebo on the ornate bridge over the lower gate.

Bench between the lake and the Loggia.

Bench between the lake and the Ibis Fountain

Bench between the chapel and the palace.

The Portal of the Guardians (Portal dos Guardiães).

Torre da Regaleira

Ziggurat

Historic azulejos decorating a wall in the garden area of the estate.

=== Tunnels ===
The park contains an extensive network of underground tunnels with multiple access points throughout the property. This subterranean system connects various grottoes, including the Virgin's Cave (Gruta da Virgem), Aquarium Cave (Gruta do Aquário), Labyrinth Cave (Gruta do Labirinto), East Cave (Gruta do Oriente), and Leda's Cave (Gruta de Leda), which lies beneath the Regaleira Tower. The system also provides passage to the chapel's crypt, which connects directly to the main palace via an underground walkway, and Waterfall Lake (Lago da Cascata).

The system is integrally connected to the Initiation Well (Poço Iniciático), a 27-metre (89 ft) "inverted tower" featuring a monumental spiral staircase. The bottom of the well opens into subterranean passages accessible via the East Cave and Waterfall Lake, while its upper and intermediate levels connect to the Guardians' Portal (Portal dos Guardiães).

Virgin's Cave

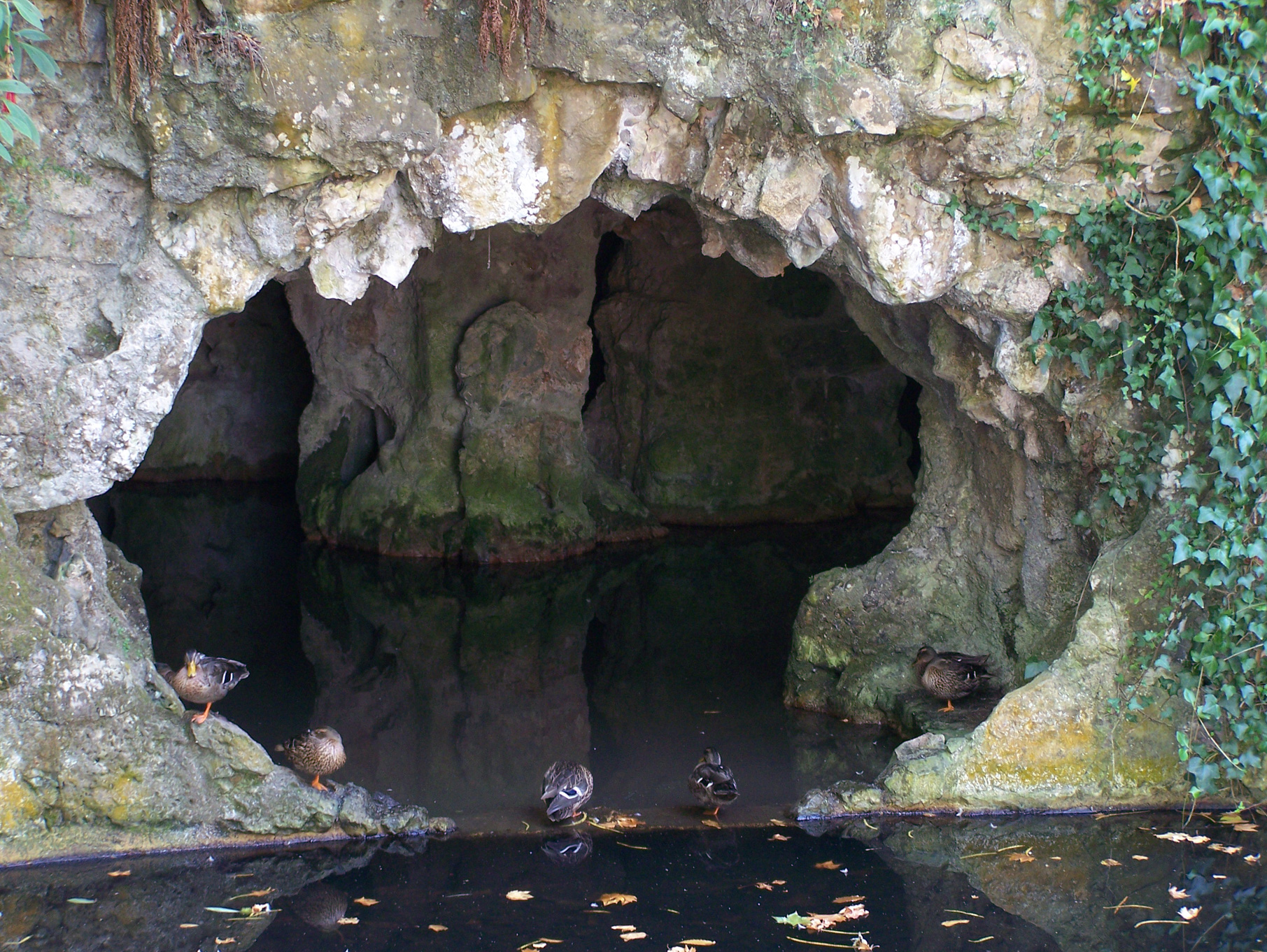
The Labyrinthic Grotto seen from the lake.

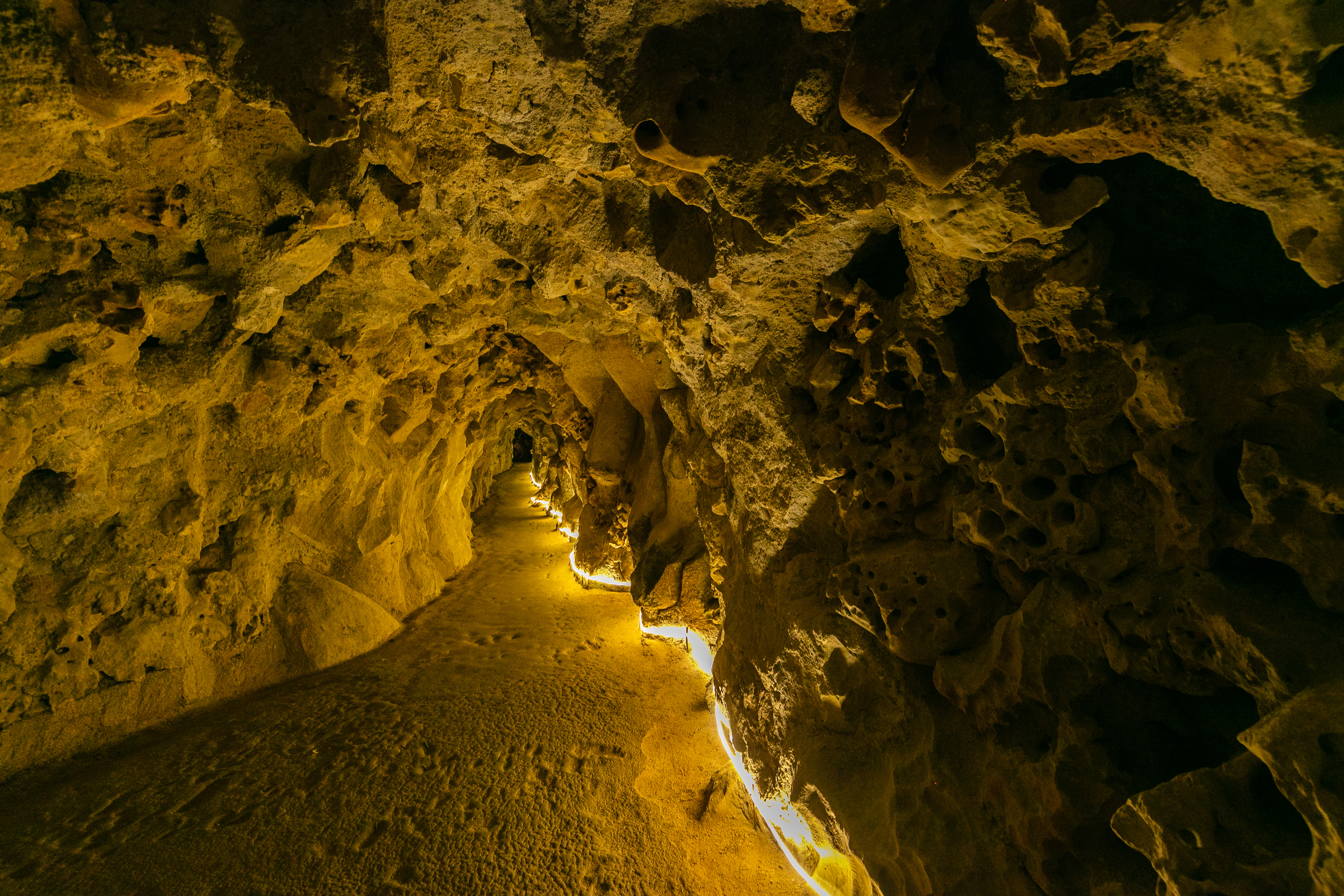
East Cave

Leda's Cave

View from the artificial grotto looking towards Lago da Cascata

=== Initiation Wells ===
The Initiation Wells (Poço Iniciático) — also called initiatic wells or inverted towers — are two well-like shafts on the property that resemble underground towers lined with stairs. These "wells" never served as water sources, but rather were constructed for ceremonial purposes. The tunnels described above connect these shafts to one another, in addition to various caves and other monuments located around the park.

Of the two shafts, the larger one contains a 27-metre spiral staircase with 23 small niches on the side. The nine flights of stairs could be linked to the Knights Templar, which had nine founders. They might also symbolize the 9 levels of Hell from Dante's Inferno. At the bottom of the shaft is an inland stone compass with the Templar cross. Other references may be to Freemasonry, Rosicrucianism rituals.

Carvalho Monteiro was possibly an initiate of the Knights Templar, a Catholic military order. This medieval order originated in the early 1100s and likely disbanded in the 1300s. However, groups like the Freemasons revived their rituals and traditions hundreds of years later. It is believed that initiations at Quinta da Regaleira began with blindfolded candidates entering one of the shafts. They purportedly held a sword close to their heart and descended the 9 flights of stairs. Once they reached the bottom, they walked into a dark labyrinth and needed to find their way up towards the light then to the chapel, where they were welcomed into the brotherhood.

The smaller shaft contains straight stairs that connect a series of ring-shaped floors to one another. This shaft is also called the 'Unfinished Well'.

Entrance to the Initiation Well.

Cross-section diagram of the Initiation Well

Detail of the moss-covered stone colonnade lining the spiral gallery of the Initiation Well.

Looking down the Initiation Well.

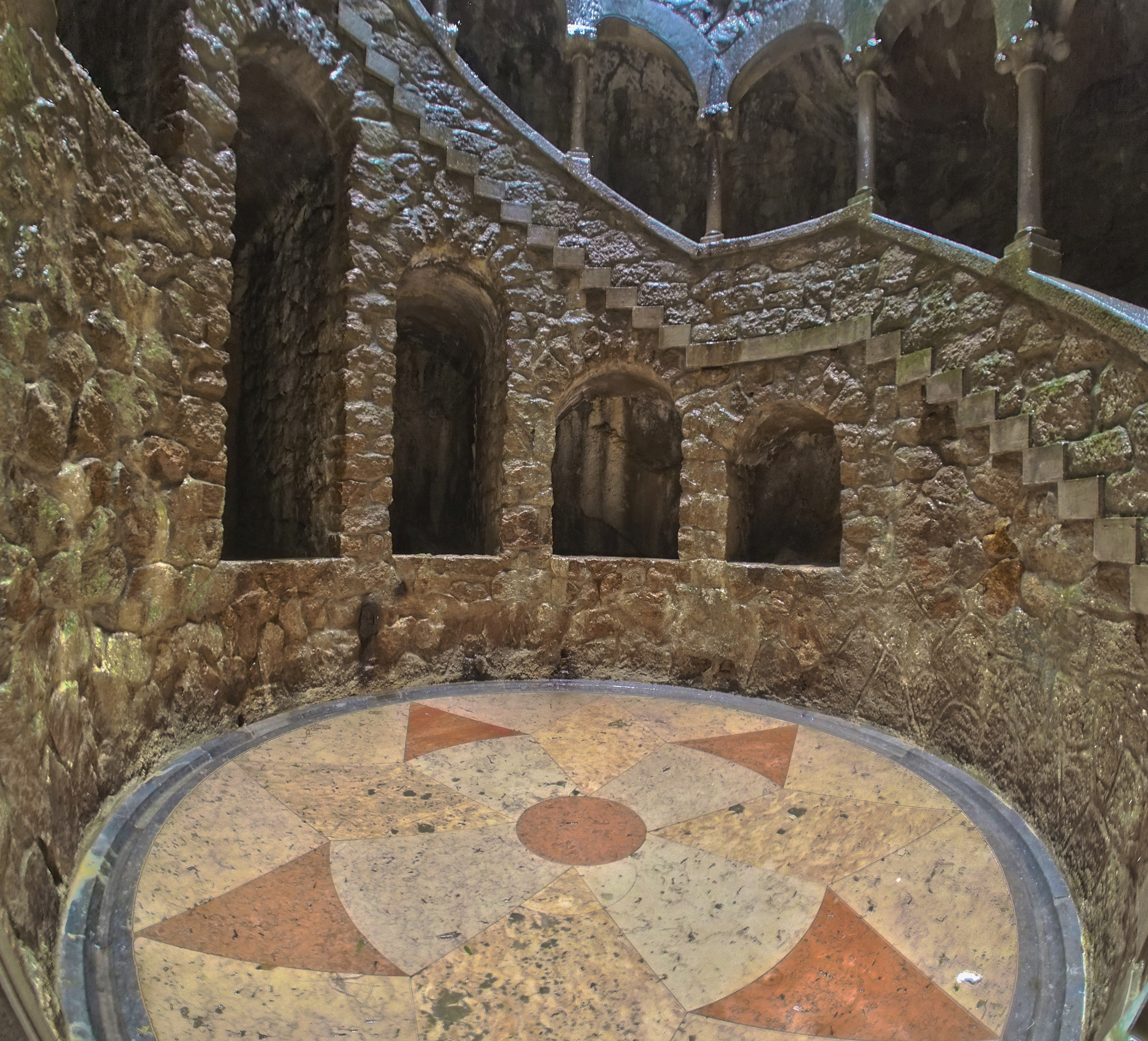
Bottom of the Initiation well.

View upwards from the bottom of the Initiation well.

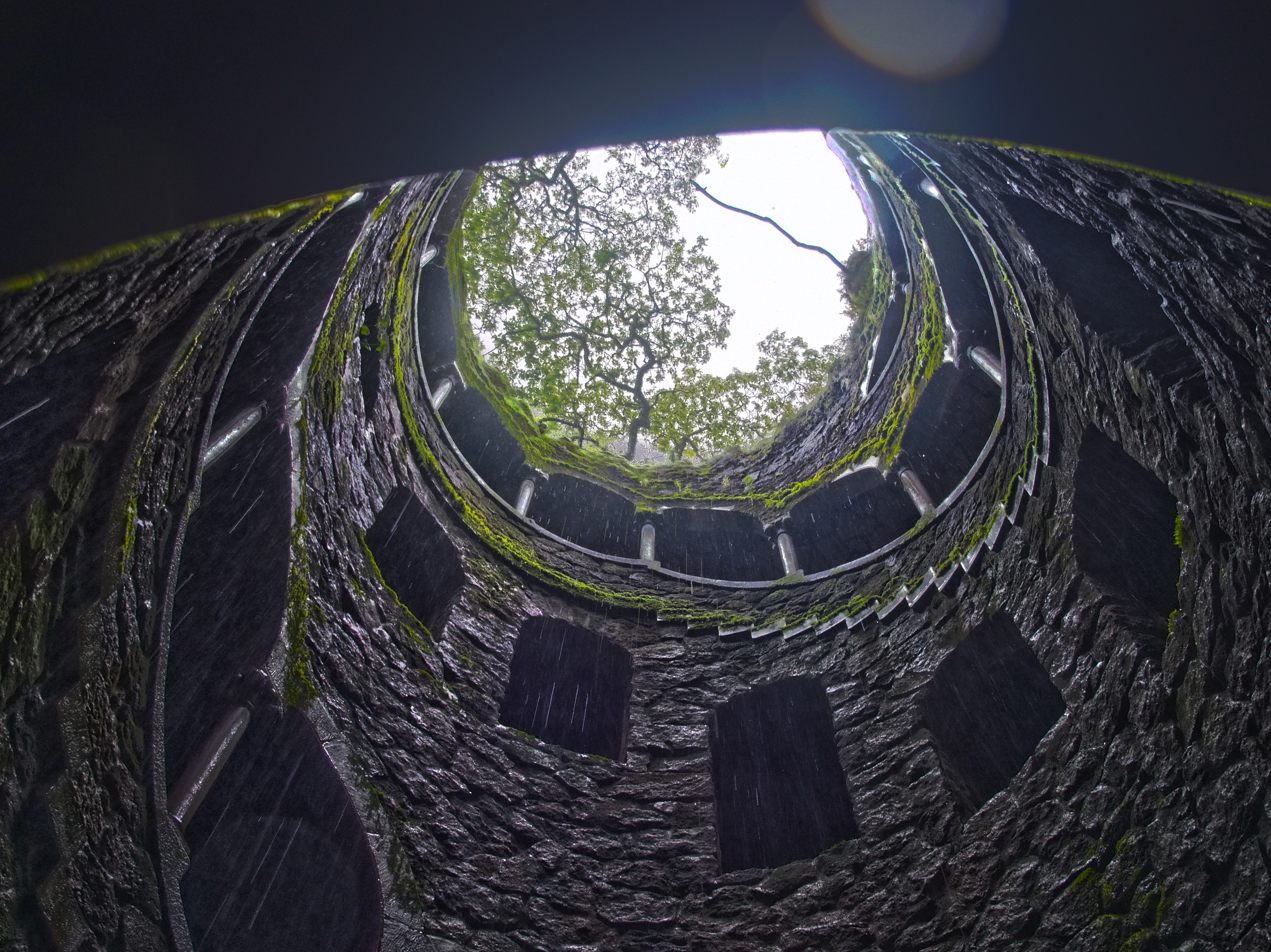
Rain down the Initiation well.

The Poço Imperfeito (Unfinished Well) tunnel, part of the Initiation Well system.

=== Lakes, fountains, and the aquarium ===
Bodies of water can be found in several places in the park. Two artificial lakes and several fountains were added by Monteiro. One of the most interesting and extravagant among them is the Aquarium, built as if it were naturally embedded in a large boulder. It was once considered the most important naturalist property in Regaleira. However, the Aquarium is no longer used and is poorly maintained.

The Fount of Abundance (Fonte da Abundância)

The Ibis Fountain (Fonte dos Ibis)

Waterfall Lake

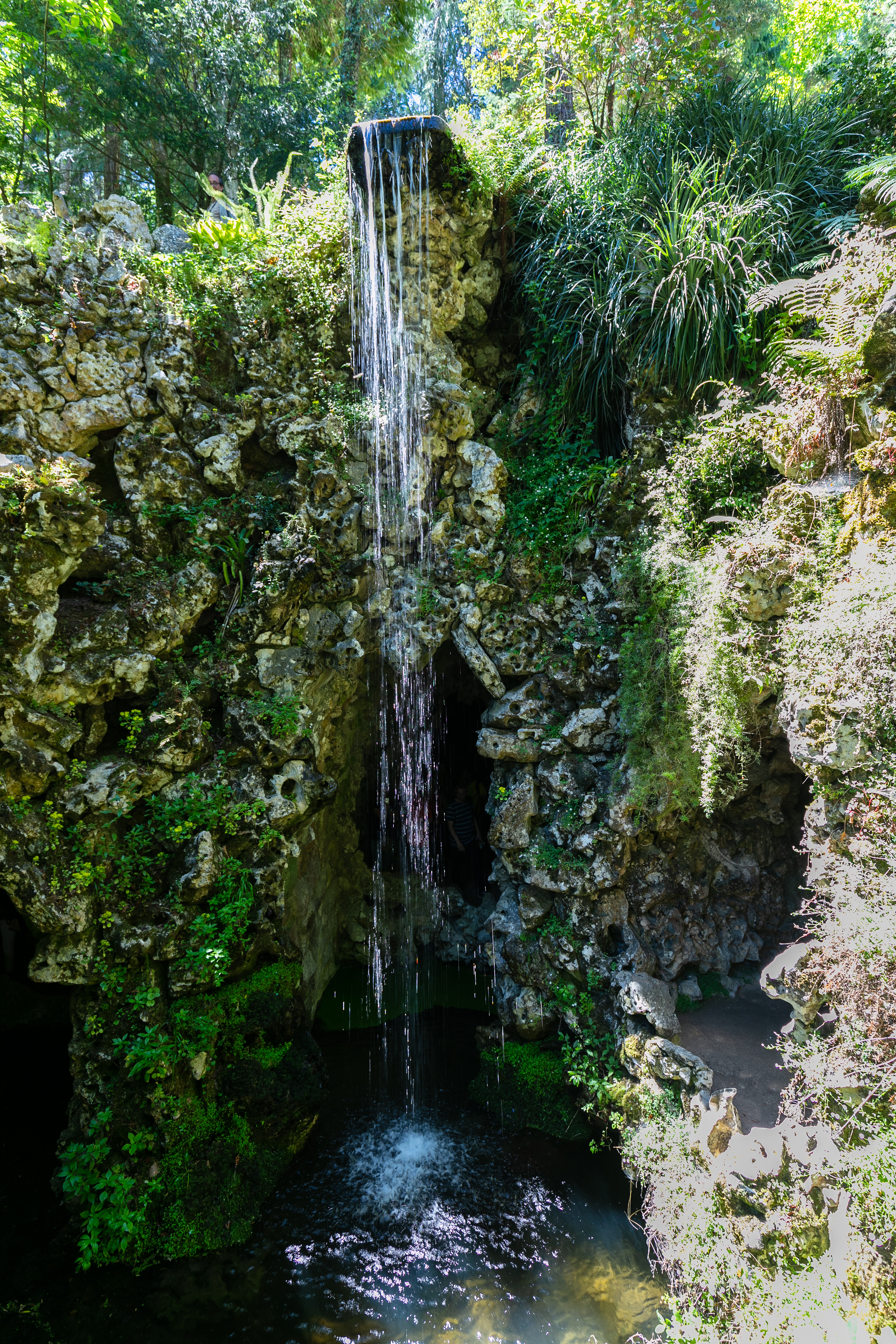
The Waterfall Lake as seen from the Terrace of the Celestial Worlds.

The bridge and stepping stones over Waterfall Lake.

== In popular culture ==
The estate was featured in the U.S. TV series Mysteries of the Abandoned episode "Alien Hell Portal" (season 4, episode 7, first broadcast 05/16/2019).

== See also ==
- Sintra National Palace
- Pena National Palace
- Queluz National Palace
- Monserrate Palace
- Seteais Palace
