= Wilhelm Ludwig von Eschwege =

German geologist, geographer (1777–1855)

Baron Wilhelm Ludwig von Eschwege
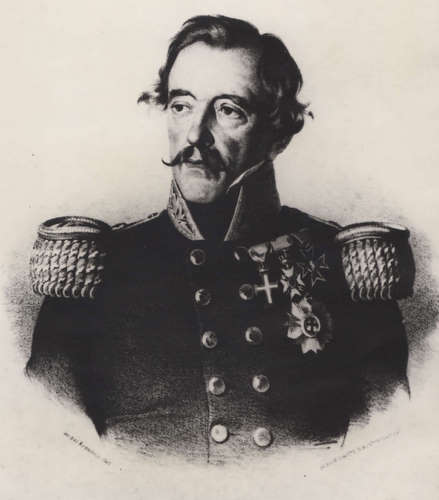
- Born: 15 November 1777
- Died: 1 February 1855 (aged 78)
- Education: University of Göttingen
- Occupations: Geologist, geographer, scientist, architect

Baron Wilhelm Ludwig von Eschwege (1777–1855) was a geologist, geographer, architect and above all a mineralogist and engineer of German mines. He played an important role in all areas of activity in both Portugal and Brazil, where he joined the Portuguese court and taking refuge in Brazil between 1807 and 1821.

== Early life ==
The Baron of Eschwege was born in Aue, in the vicinity of the city that gives its name to his family, Eschwege, in the Duchy of Hessen-Kassel, today part of the Federal State of Hessen, Germany. In Göttingen in Lower-Saxony, he studied law and science, studies he completed at the University of Marburg before launching on a military career. Whilst still in Germany, he was contracted to serve as director of mines in Portugal, where he arrived in 1803, accompanied by another military engineer Friedrich Ludwig Wilhelm Varnhagen, father of the renowned historian Francisco Adolfo de Varnhagen, who played a crucial role in the classification of the Manueline style. Eschwege worked in Ferrarias da Foz de Alge, on the confluence of this watercourse and the Zêzere River. While still in Portugal, he engaged in pioneering mineralogy studies of the country.

== Explorations in Brazil ==
In 1809, already married and with a son, Eschwege set off from Lisbon for Brazil, where he arrived in the following year. There, Eschwege would engage in a pioneering study of the geology and mineralogical explorations and publishing the results of his scientific work. In Rio de Janeiro, he became head of the Royal Office of Mineralogy, before being nominated Intendant of the Gold Mines. In Congonhas do Campo, Minas Gerais, Eschwege founded the Fábrica Patriótica (Patriotic Factory) for mining operations while simultaneous studying Brazilian geology in wide reaching research campaigns. Furthermore, prior to his return to Europe, the baron was introduced to the Princess of Beira, Maria, future Queen Maria II of Portugal.

Due to his research work, teaching and industrial explorations, the Baron of Eschwege left behind a legacy in Brazil and, even while without gaining the scale and universality of that of Alexander von Humboldt in other South American countries, is worthy of some form of comparison. As a matter of fact, Eschwege and Humboldt were personal acquaintances after having met at a dinner given by King Frederick William IV of Prussia in Berlin in 1847.

== Return from Brazil ==
Following his return from Brazil, the Baron of Eschwege made diverse tours of European countries such as France and Britain as well as the Germany of his birth. He also made several returns to Portugal where he became a correspondent member of the Lisbon Academy of Sciences, and King João VI bestowed upon him the military Order of São Bento de Avis. In 1834, he travelled to the Portuguese capital in the company of Auguste de Leuchtenberg, who married the young Queen Maria II. However, with Augusto passing away just four months on from having arrived in Lisbon, it was the queen’s second husband that the Baron Eschwege would serve and with the honour that made him famous in Portugal: building the Palace and Park of Pena. Acting as both architect and landscape designer, the Baron of Eschwege worked in Pena with Ferdinand of Saxe-Coburg and Gotha between 1838 and 1850. Throughout this period, he embarked on tours of central Europe and Algeria that provided crucial inputs into explaining the architectural solutions found in the Palace of Pena. In 1850, the “Portuguese” made his return to his country of birth and called upon to serve as baron at the family house and where he would die in 1855.

== Selected works ==
- Journal von Brasilien, oder vermischte Nachrichten aus Brasilien, auf wissenschaftlichen Reisen gesammelt, 1818 – Journal of Brazil, or miscellaneous information on Brazil, gathered during scientific travels.
- Geognostische Gemälde von Brasilien und wahrscheinliches Muttergestein der Diamanten, 1822 – Geognostic portrayals of Brazil and the probable bedrock of diamonds.
- Beiträge zur Gebirgskunde Brasiliens, 1832 – Contributions to the orography of Brazil.
- Pluto brasiliensis: Eine Reihe von Abhandlungen über Brasiliens Gold-, Diamanten- und anderen mineralischen Reichthum, 1833 – Pluto brasiliensis: a series of treatises on Brazil's gold, diamonds and other mineral riches.
