= Quinta (estate) =

Type of rural property in Portugal

Quinta da Regaleira in Sintra.

Quinta [ˈkĩtɐ] is a traditional term for an estate, primarily used in Portugal and the Portuguese-speaking world, but the term has sometimes been borrowed in non-Portuguese speaking countries of Ibero-America.

== Definition ==
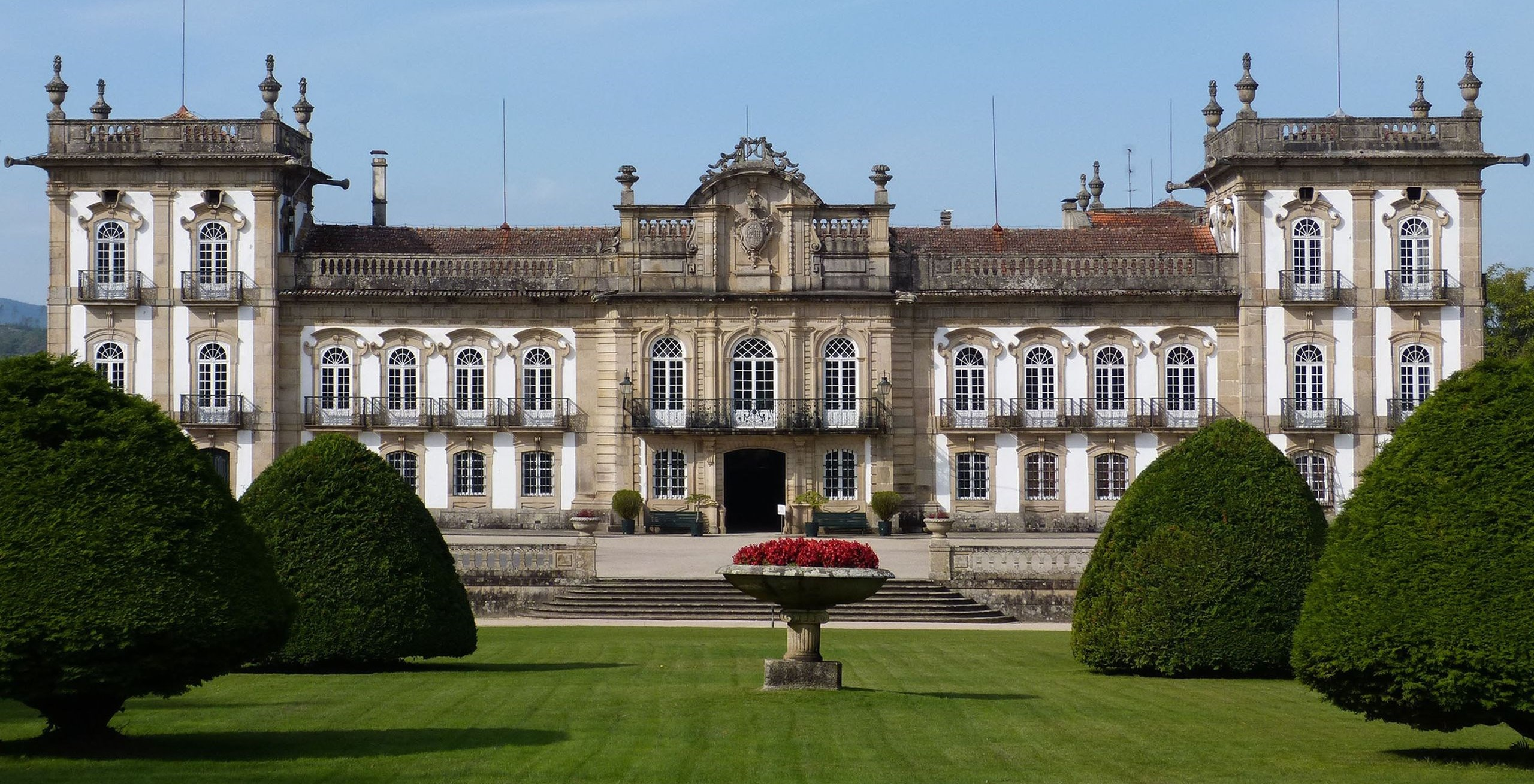
Quinta da Brejoeira in Monção.

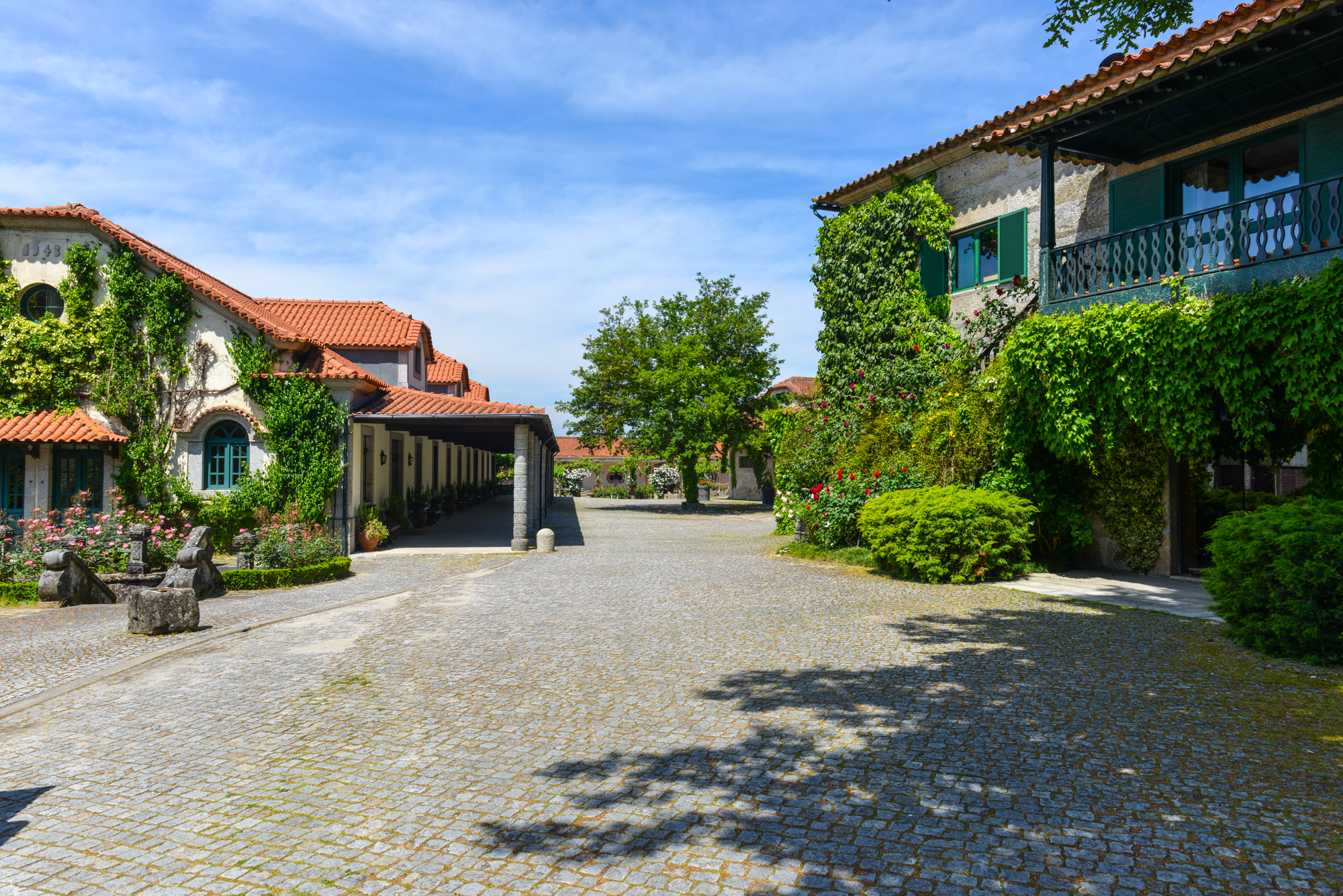
Quinta da Avelada in Penafiel, an example of a traditional rural quinta.

=== Mainland Portugal ===
A quinta is a primarily rural property, especially those with historic manors and palaces in continental Portugal. The term is also used as an appellation for agricultural estates, such as wineries, vineyards, and olive groves.

In urban contexts, quintas may often be walled-off mansions in city centers, but the term may also be applied to edifices once located in a more rural setting that have since been developed.

The name was later often given to generally larger land estates that might originally have been used for agricultural purposes but were converted into residential estates.

=== Modern definitions ===
The term has also been applied to affluent gated communities in Portugal, Lusophone Africa and Brazil, such as Quinta da Beloura in the Portuguese Riviera, Quinta do Lago in the Algarve or Quinta da Baroneza in Bragança Paulista.

=== Madeira ===
In Madeira, the term "quinta" usually refers to a rustic or urban property, of greater or lesser extent, walled in all or at least a considerable part of its perimeter, always containing a good dwelling house, surrounded by gardens and pavements lined with clumps of trees. It is accessed by an iron gate, of a certain architectural appearance, which connects to a pavement that leads directly to the residence. There are many quintas that cover land cultivated with vines and sugar cane, vegetable gardens, orchards and groves of trees. Some of them have buildings for various agricultural services, stables and caretakers' dwellings.

The oldest ones usually have an adjoining chapel in addition to the main house, which was once for the private use of their owners, while the ones in urban areas are known to have casinhas de prazer. These small houses, Romanesque in inspiration, were built on the garden walls facing the main street in painted wood or stone, with windows fitted with bilhardeiras - small vertical folds that softened the slope of the sun shades, improving the view from the inside - and used for recreational purposes such as gossiping, embroidering, reading and card games.

== Notable quintas ==
Portugal

- Quinta da Regaleira, Sintra
- Quinta da Ribafria, Sintra
- Quinta do Relógio, Sintra
- Quinta do Ramalhão, Sintra
- Quinta das Lágrimas, Coimbra
- Quinta dos Lagares d'El-Rei, Lisbon
- Quinta da Boa Hora, Azores
- Quinta Vigia, Madeira

Brazil

- Quinta da Boa Vista, Rio de Janeiro

Non-Portuguese speaking countries

- Quinta de Olivos, Argentina
- Quinta Gameros, Mexico
- Quinta Vergara, Chile
- Quinta del Sordo, Spain
- Quinta de Bolivar, Colombia
