= Sintra (Santa Maria e São Miguel, São Martinho e São Pedro de Penaferrim) =

Civil parish in Lisbon District, Portugal

- Civil parish
- Location in Portugal
- Coordinates: 38.798°N 9.387°W
- Country: Portugal
- Region: Lisbon
- Metropolitan area: Lisbon
- District: Lisbon
- Municipality: Sintra

Area
  - Total: 63.55 km^{2} (24.54 sq mi)

Population (2011)
  - Total: 29,591
  - Density: 470/km^{2} (1,200/sq mi)
- Time zone: UTC+00:00 (WET)
  - Summer (DST): UTC+01:00 (WEST)

Sintra (Santa Maria e São Miguel, São Martinho e São Pedro de Penaferrim) is a civil parish in the municipality of Sintra, Lisbon District, Portugal. It was formed in 2013 by the merger of the former parishes Santa Maria e São Miguel, São Martinho and São Pedro de Penaferrim. The population in 2011 was 29,591, in an area of 63.55 km^{2}.

== History ==
It was created during the administrative reorganization of 2012/2013, resulting from the aggregation of the former parishes of Santa Maria and São Miguel, São Martinho and São Pedro de Penaferrim.
