= António Augusto Carvalho Monteiro =

Brazilian-Portuguese businessman, collector and entomologist (1848-1920)

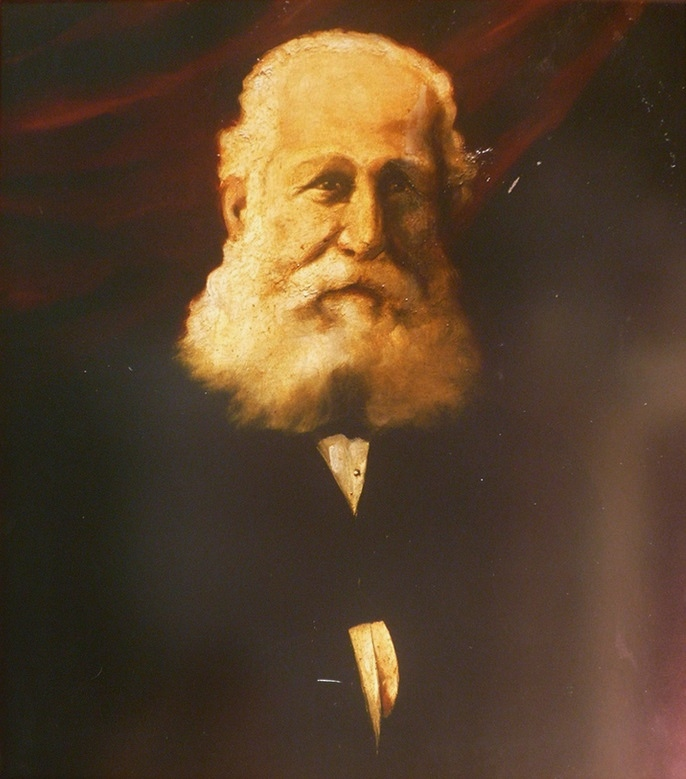
- Born: 1848; Rio de Janeiro, Brazil
- Died: 1920 (aged 71–72)
- Education: University of Coimbra
- Known for: Businessman, Collector, Bibliophile, Entomologist, Freemason
- Spouse: Perpétua Augusta Pereira de Melo
- Children: Two
- Parent(s): Francisco Monteiro and Teresa de Carvalho

António Augusto Carvalho Monteiro (1848–1920), also known as Monteiro dos Milhões (Monteiro the Millionaire), was a Brazilian-Portuguese businessman, collector, bibliophile, entomologist and Freemason. His largesse created the Quinta da Regaleira.

== Early life and education ==
António was born to Portuguese parents in Rio de Janeiro. His father, Francisco Monteiro, originally from Lagos da Beira, immigrated at the age of 13 to escape the priesthood his father had destined for him. He initially worked in an English coal import company. Francisco later married Teresa de Carvalho, the daughter of a wealthy merchant who had left Lisbon with the Portuguese court.

In 1873, he married Perpétua Augusta Pereira de Melo, with whom he had two children.

António inherited a huge family fortune, which he enlarged in Brazil by selling coffee and precious stones, which soon made it possible for him to leave for Portugal.

António was fluent in Latin, Greek, French and German. In 1871, he received a degree in Law from the University of Coimbra. He also received prizes in agriculture and mineralogy. He was a member of many scientific societies, including the Royal Spanish Society of Natural History, the German Entomological Society, and the Entomological Societies of France, London and Belgium (1889 ).

== Interests ==
Carvalho Monteiro was an accomplished naturalist. He had large collections of butterflies, shells, and orchids. He had the second largest lepidopteran collection in the world, only surpassed by that of Baron Walter de Rothschild. In addition, he was involved with his father in the foundation of the Lisbon Zoo and served as executive director and honorary president in 1917.

Carvalho Monteiro was a well-known bibliophile, with a superb collection of the works of the 16th-century poet Camões. He also gathered more than 600 works on entomology.

Carvalho Monteiro was represented in the press of his time as both an altruist and an eccentric, exemplified by his famous Leroy 01, claimed to be the most complicated clock in the world.

== Tomb ==
Carvalho Monteiro had the same architect who built the Palácio da Regaleira, Luigi Manini, build his tomb in the Prazeres Cemetery. The door of the tomb, also encrusted with symbolism, was opened with the same key that opened the Palácio da Regaleira and his palace in Lisbon, on the Rua do Alecrim. As visitors enter the cemetery grove, they encounter the tomb on the left, with the orientation, size, and shape of a Masonic temple, oriented towards the east. It is covered in various symbols. The door knocker is engraved with a bee carrying a skull. The bee, which is diligent and hard-working, represents the Mason in his organized work. The gradeamento which can be seen in the back of the tomb, is festooned with the symbolic wine and bread, the spirit and the body. There are also decorative owls, symbolizing wisdom, as well as poppies, the symbol of eternal sleep.

== See also ==
- Quinta da Regaleira
