= Quinta do Relógio =

Building in Lisbon District, Portugal

Coordinates: 38°47′46.82″N 9°23′43.05″W

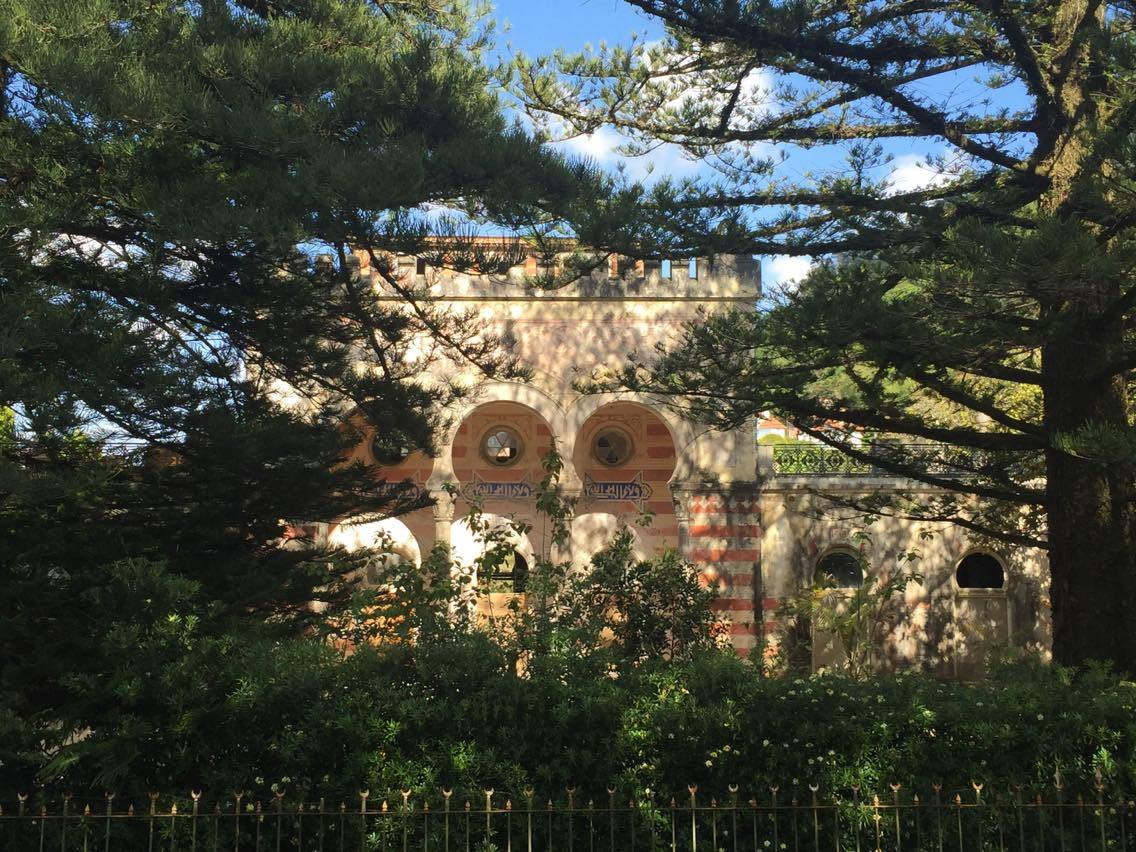
Quinta do Relógio (2016)

Quinta do Relógio (literal translation: Clock Tower Estate) is a quinta located near the historic center of Sintra, on the Portuguese Riviera. It is classified as a World Heritage Site by UNESCO within the "Cultural Landscape of Sintra". Along with the nearby palaces such as Seteais Palace and the Quinta da Regaleira next to it, it is considered one of the tourist attractions of Sintra. The property consists of a romantic palace and chapel, and a park. Relógio was featured in numerous publications internationally including Variety magazine, and Architectural Digest, when pop star Madonna reportedly purchased the property.

== History ==
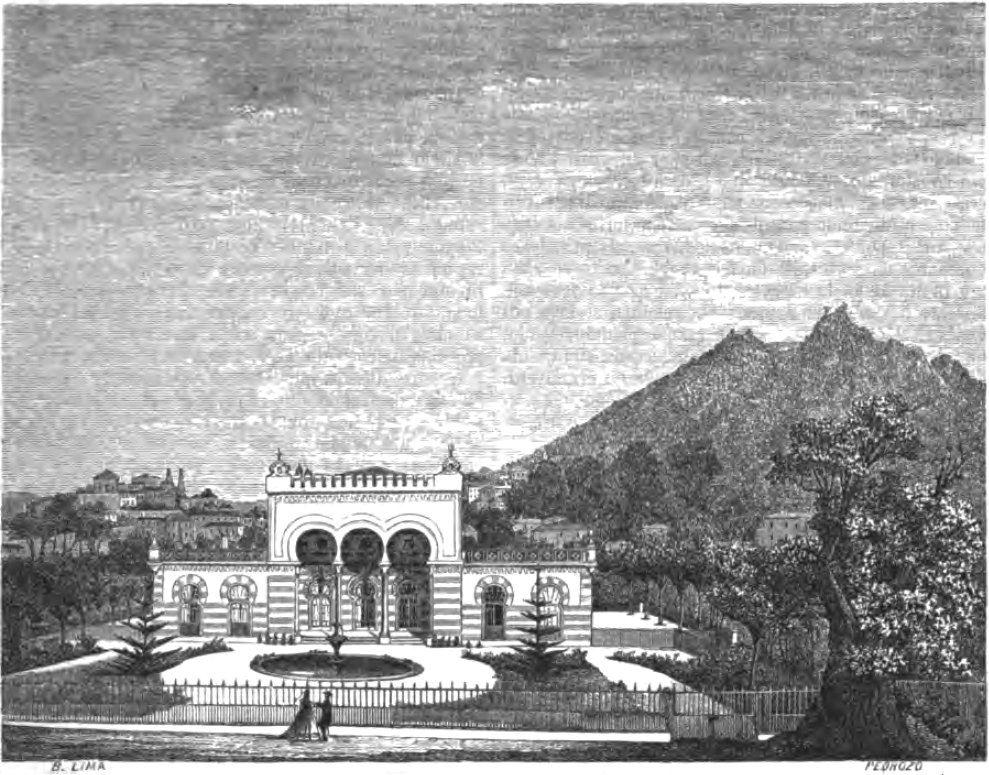
The Quinta do Relógio (Etching from 1864 in Archivo Pittoresco vol. 7 by Nogueira da Silva & Pedrozo)

The estate, or quinta in Portuguese, was acquired by José de Sousa Coutinho, 15th Count of Redondo during the second half of the 18th century. During the reign of Dom Pedro V of Portugal, the architect António Manuel da Fonseca Jr. was commissioned to design and construct the palace. His design was influenced by Romanticism and Mudéjar Moorish Revival architecture with Neo-Manueline elements. The style is similar to nearby Monserrate Palace and elements of Pena Palace. The Islamic architectural influence is in reference to when the region was a part of the wider Muslim Gharb Al-Andalus until the 13th century.

Later, the estate was acquired by a millionaire who ordered the construction of a clock tower (in Portuguese: Relógio) that would give the estate its name. The clock tower was later demolished and it is unclear where exactly its location was.

In May 1886 crown prince Dom Carlos and princess Amélie of Orléans spent part of their honeymoon here.

The estate had fallen into disrepair, and had been put up for sale.

It was classified in 1997 as a property of public interest and included as part of the World Heritage Site "Cultural Landscape of Sintra".

== Architecture ==
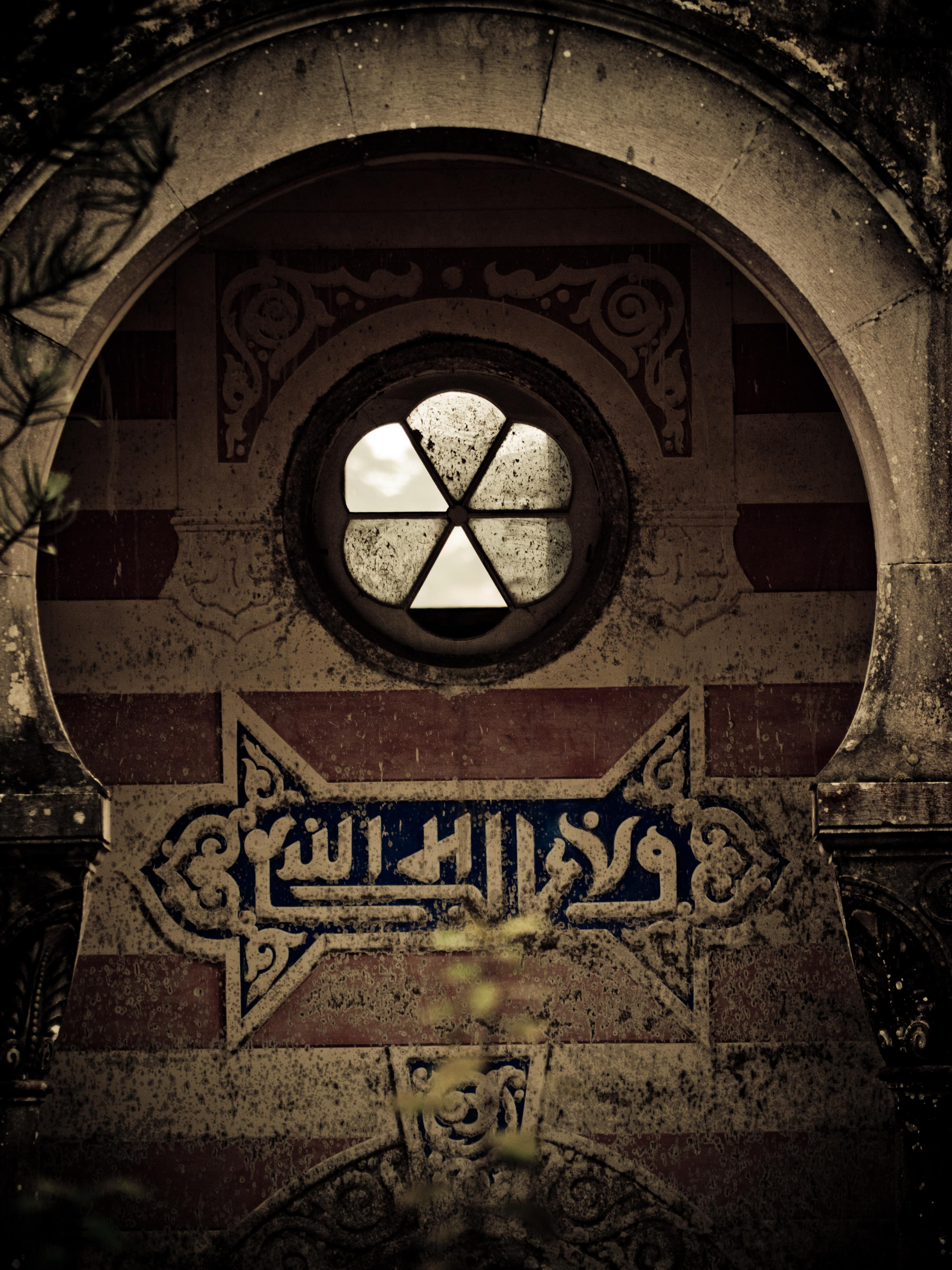
Main entrance with window and Arabic inscription

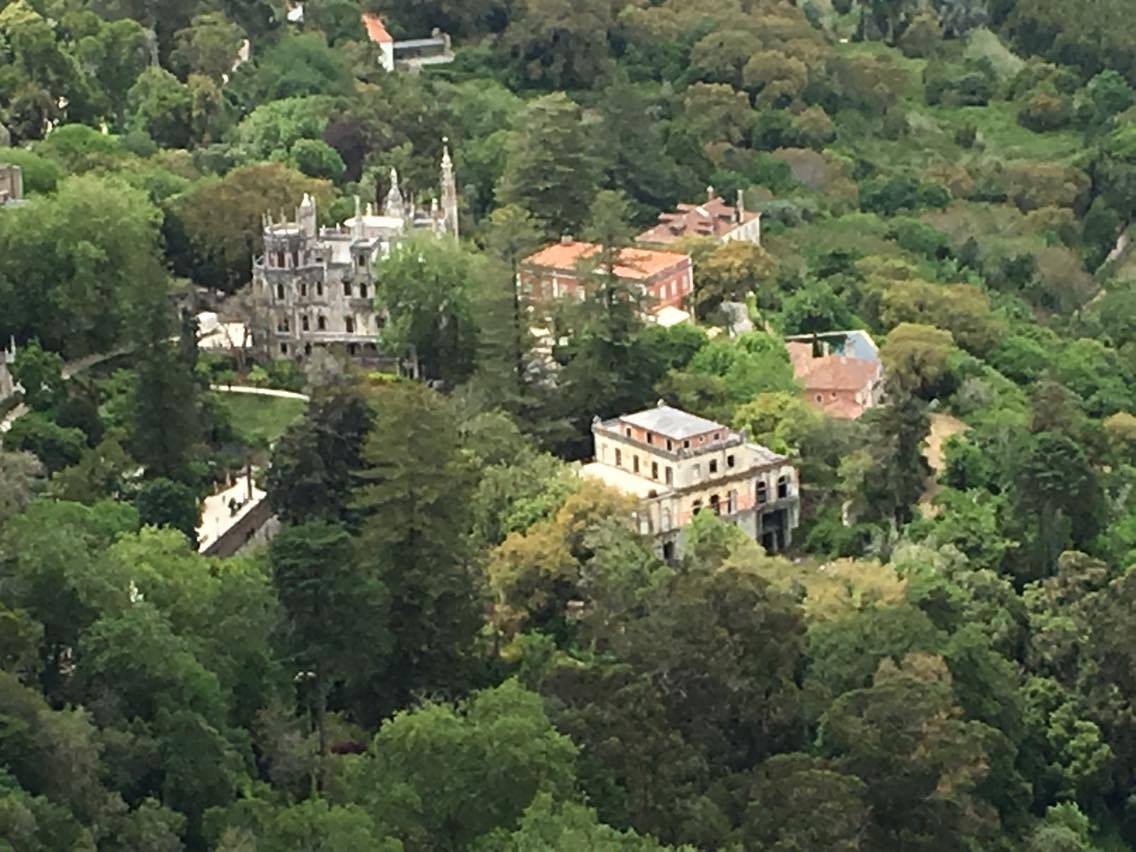
View towards the Quinta do Relógio from the Castle of the Moors

The palace is considered one of the most important monuments of the Portuguese Moorish Revival style. It is on the perimeter of the Natural Park of Sintra-Cascais.

Above the main entrance there is an Arabic inscription which reads: "Wa lā ghāliba illā-llāh (There is no victor but God)" which was the motto of the Emir of Granada.

The house has four floors with about 1500m2 of floor area. The estate has an area of 22.144m2. Next to the actual palace is also the house of servants, which has been refurbished.

== Park ==
The garden is designed in a romantic style with a lake, several springs and fountains and is surrounded by lush greenery with rare species such as pines, centuries-old oak trees, palm trees, cedars, magnolias, camellias and fuchsias, among many others.

The park offers views towards the Castle of the Moors.

== See also ==
- Quinta da Regaleira
- Seteais Palace
- Castle of the Moors
