= Monserrate Palace =

Historic palace in Lisbon, Portugal

Coordinates: 38.7942°N 9.4206°W

- Palácio de Monserrate
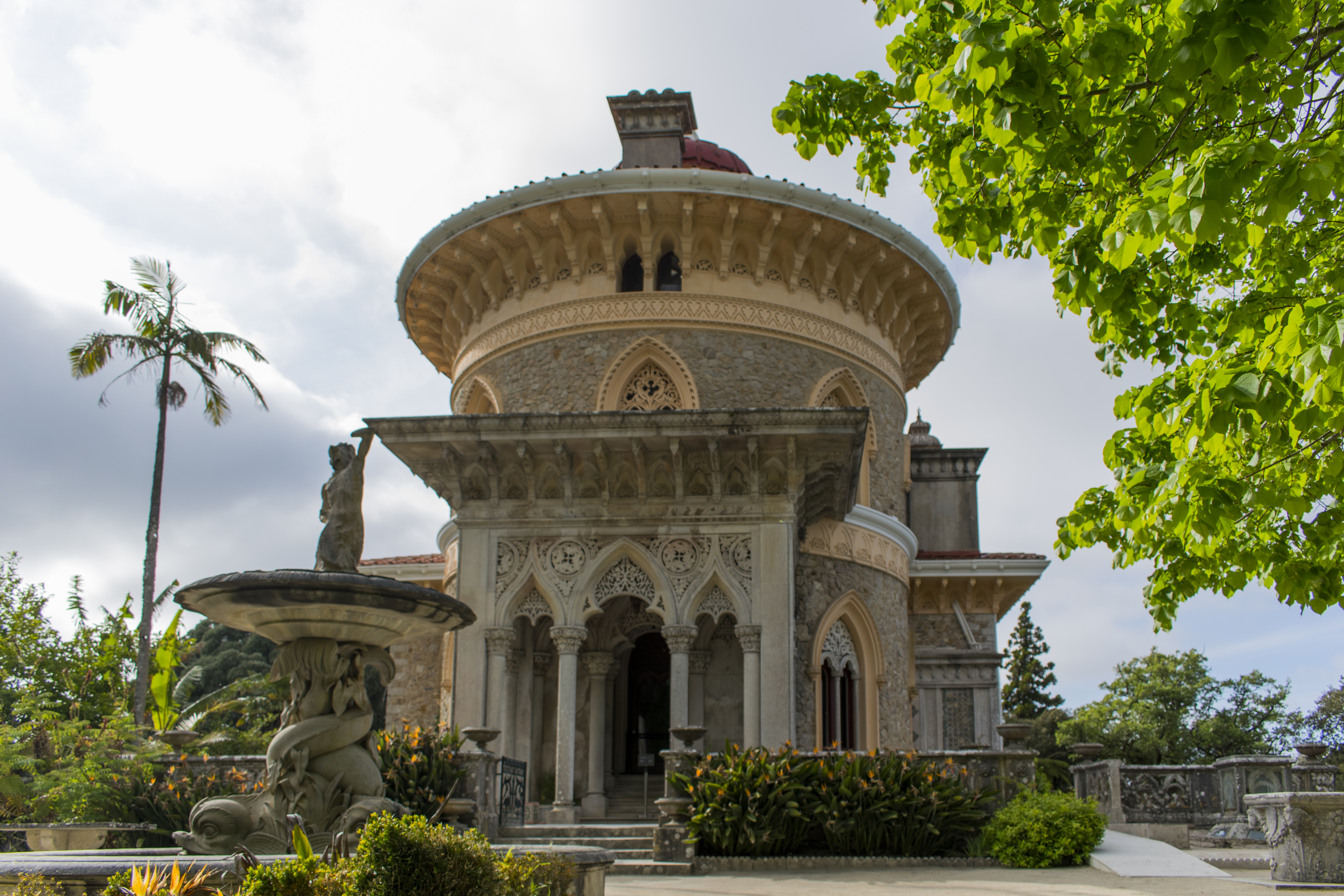

General information
- Status: Property of Public Interest
- Architectural style: Eclecticism
- Location: Sintra, Portugal
- Construction started: 1863
- Owner: Portuguese State

Design and construction
- Architect: James Thomas Knowles (1806–1884)

Website
- parquesdesintra.pt

UNESCO World Heritage Site
- Part of: Cultural Landscape of Sintra
- Criteria: Cultural: (ii), (iv), (v)
- Reference: 723
- Inscription: 1995 (19th Session)

Portuguese National Monument
- Type: Non-movable
- Criteria: Monument of Public Interest
- Designated: 12 September 1978
- Reference no.: IPA.00004069

The Monserrate Palace (Portuguese: Palácio de Monserrate) is a palatial villa located near Sintra, the traditional summer resort of the Portuguese court in the foothills overlooking the Atlantic Ocean north west of the capital, Lisbon.

== History ==
According to legend, there was a chapel dedicated to Virgin Mary built by Afonso Henriques after the reconquest of Sintra (circa 1093). On its ruins another chapel dedicated to Our Lady of Monserrate was constructed on the top of the hill in 1540. The estate was then owned by Hospital Real de Todos os Santos, Lisbon. In the 17th century possession of the property was taken by the Mello e Castro family but after the 1755 Lisbon earthquake the farmhouse became unlivable.

An English merchant named Gerard de Visme rented the farm in 1789 and built a neo-Gothic house over the ruins of the chapel. In 1793-1794 the estate was subleased by William Thomas Beckford who started to design a landscaped garden. Though the property was still in ruins when Lord Byron visited in 1809, its magnificent appearance inspired the poet, who mentioned of the beauty of Monserrate in Childe Harold's Pilgrimage. After that, the property attracted foreign travelers’ attention. One of them was Francis Cook, a wealthy English merchant who subleased the estate in 1856 and was graced with the title of Viscount of Monserrate by Luís I. Cook purchased the property in 1863 and started to work with the architect James Knowles on the remains of the house built by de Visme. The Palace became the summer residence of the Cook family.

The design was influenced by Romanticism and Mudéjar Moorish Revival architecture with neo-Gothic elements. The eclecticism is a fine example of the Sintra Romanticism, along with other nearby palácios, such as the Pena Palace and the Quinta do Relógio. The Islamic architectural influence is in reference to when the region was a part of the wider Muslim Gharb Al-Andalus until the 12th century.

The property and hunting grounds were acquired by the Portuguese state in 1949. In 1978 the Park and Palace of Monserrate were categorized as a building of public interest. In 1995 Sintra Mountains, including the Park of Monserrate, was defined as a World Heritage Cultural Landscape by UNESCO. The management of the Park of Monserrate was taken over by the Sintra Park in 2000 and its recovery and restoration program enabled the Palace to re-open to the public. In 2013 the Park of Monserrate was honored with European Garden Award under the category of “Best Development of a Historic Park or Garden”.

== Park ==
The terrace leads out into the large park. It is designed in a romantic style with a lake, several springs and fountains, grottoes, and is surrounded by lush greenery with rare species.

The garden is full of plants organized according to geographical areas. There are naturally grown regional strawberry and holly bushes, cork oaks; araucaria and palm trees, tree ferns from Australia and New Zealand; and agaves and yuccas from Mexico. There are camellias, azaleas, rhododendrons, bamboos as well representing Japan.

== Farmyard ==
The Farmyard of Monserrate covers an area around 2 hectares including native trees and a water line. It is like a small farm with various types of plants and fields for livestock. The farmyard has a renewable energy system, so it is entirely self-sufficient in terms of energy.

The former house built in the 19th century was restored and furnished with equipment for educational activities, or kitchen workshops. There are orchard and vegetable patches, are of wild plants and berries, as well as cereals and aromatic plants in the farmyard. Plantation area is surrounded with the fields of horses, donkeys and sheep, besides a rabbit hutch, and a poultry coop. There is also a picnic area, an open-air amphitheater and a barn.

The stream runs through the farmyard and takes its water supply from natural springs of Monserrate Hunting Grounds. The stream has also been restored, and now amphibians and water animals get benefit of it.

=== Totem ===
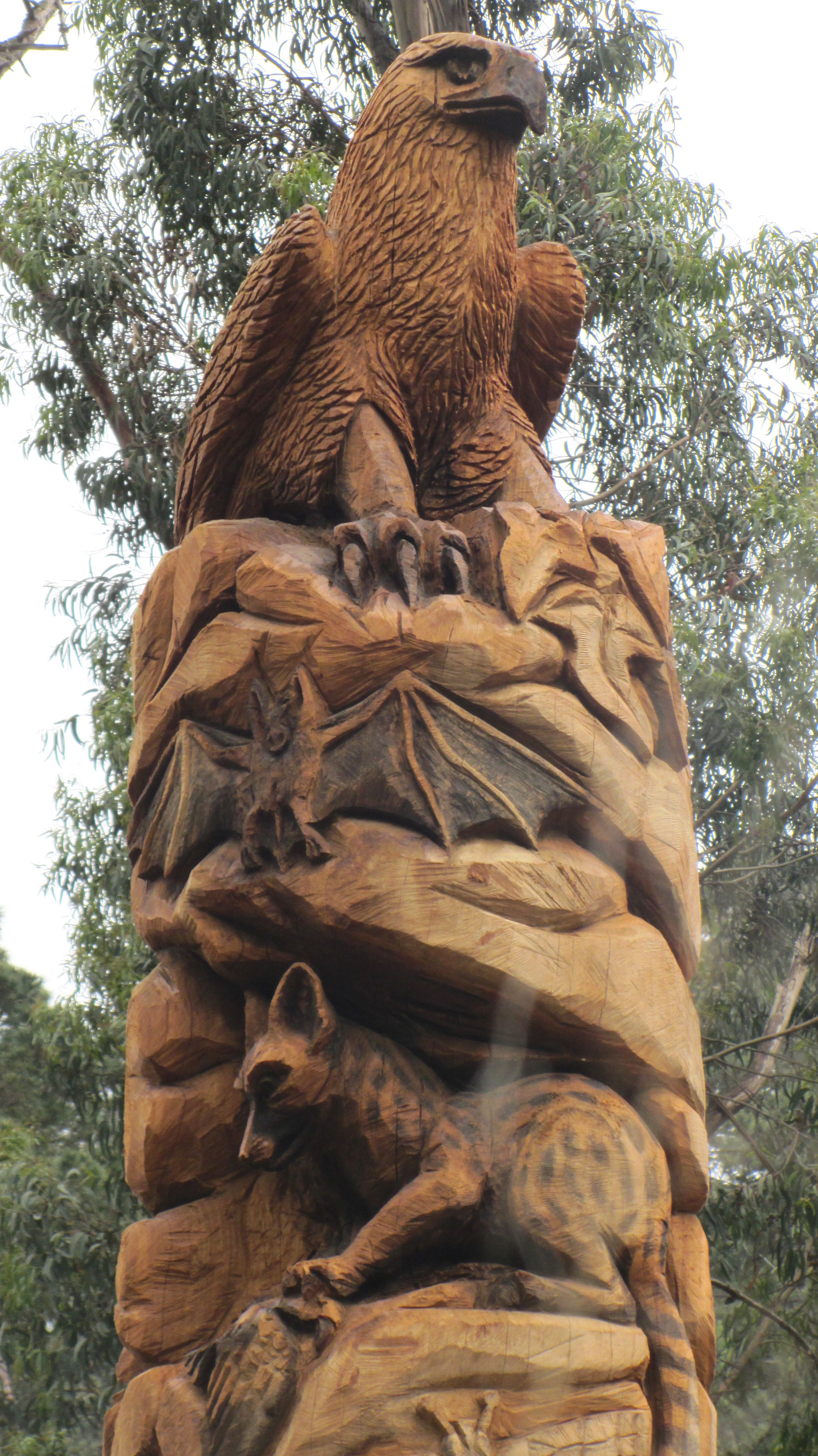
Totem (Nansi Hemming)

The sculpture has 7.5 metres height and was made of the trunk of a fifty years old eucalyptus tree with a chainsaw. The tree had no chance to survive due to serious infestation by wood-decay fungus, therefore with an intervention it was kept instead of being cut. The tree was made the object of specific natural values of Sintra Mountains.

The totem of the farmyard of Monserrate was created by a Welsh artist (Nansi Hemming) who is experienced at wood sculpturing. The natural values portrayed on the totem are: Bonelli's eagle; Lesser horseshoe bat; Stage beetle; Badger; Egyptian mongoose; Lataste's viper; Mottled owl; Eurasian eagle owl; Fire salamander; Tarantula hawk; Marsh fritillary; Genet; and relict forest of Oak, Arbutus, European Holly and Ivy-leaved-fern.

=== The Off-Grid Farmyard ===
Renewable energy project “Off-Grid Farmyard” is implemented at the Farmyard of Monserrate in order to produce electricity to meet the consumption of the Farmyard. Renewable energy is produced through 3 different sources in the Farmyard: wind power – with an air generator; hydropower – with a water turbine; solar power – with a set of photovoltaic panels.

Infrastructure and equipment for “Off-grid Farmyard” was installed in 2012 under the framework of BIO+Sintra project financed by the LIFE programme of the European Commission and run by Sintra Park – Monte da Lua.

== Images ==
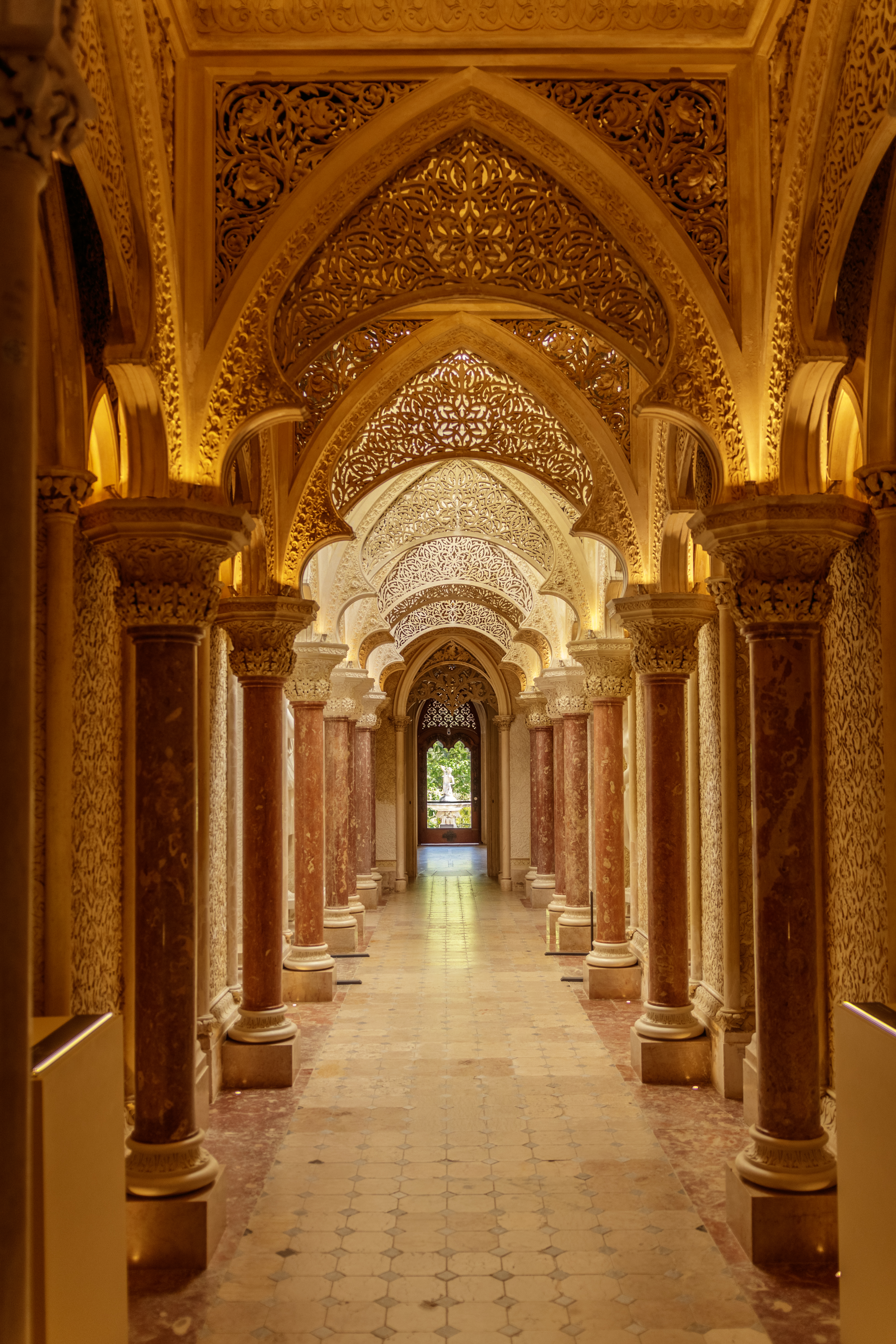
Hallway

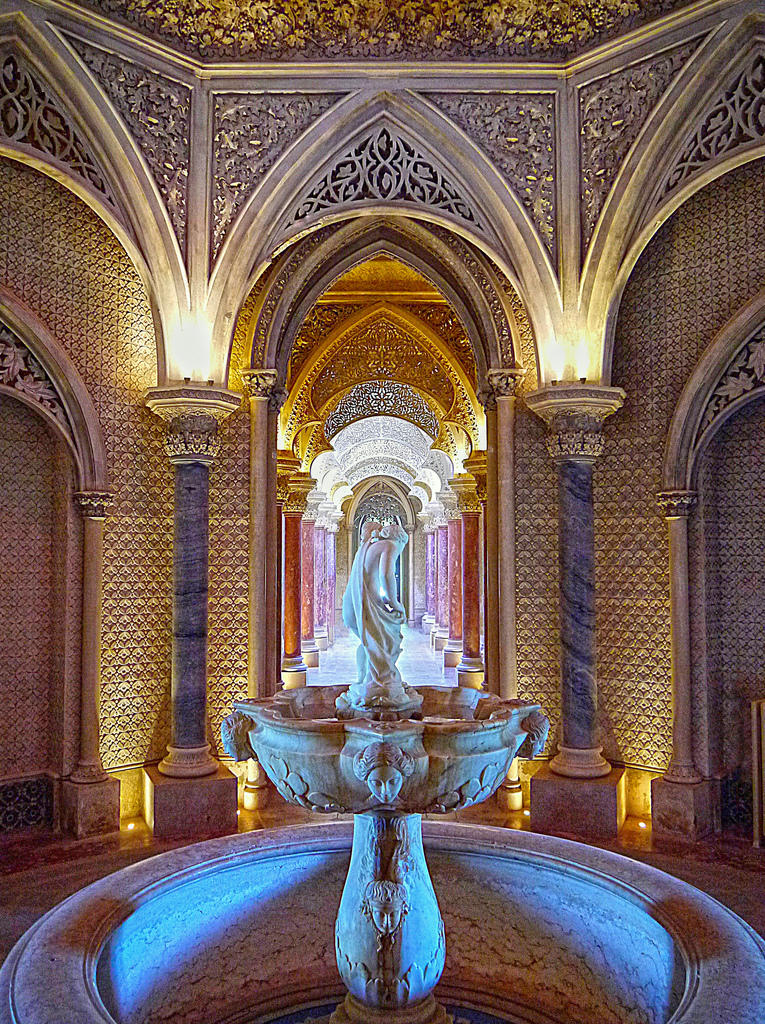
Fountain in central hallway

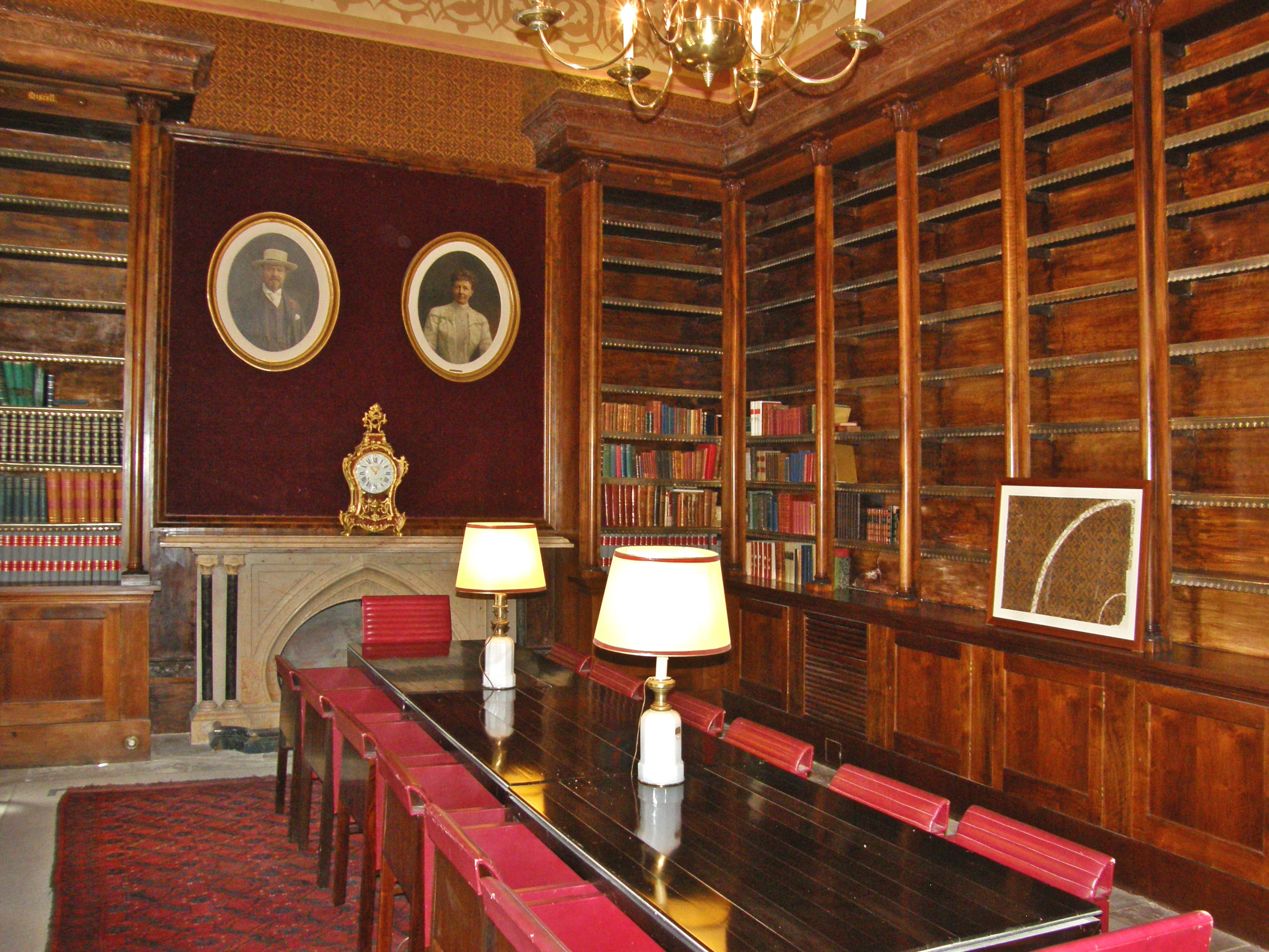
Library

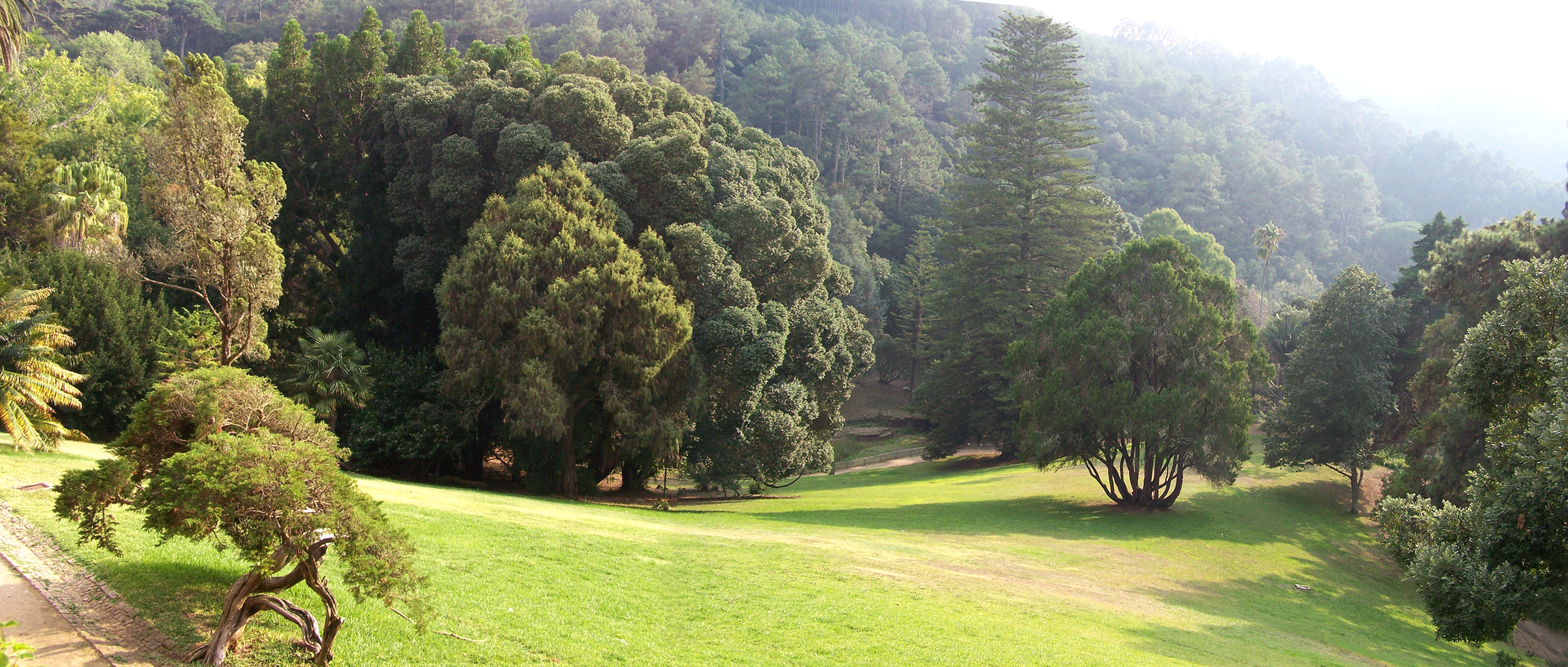
Park

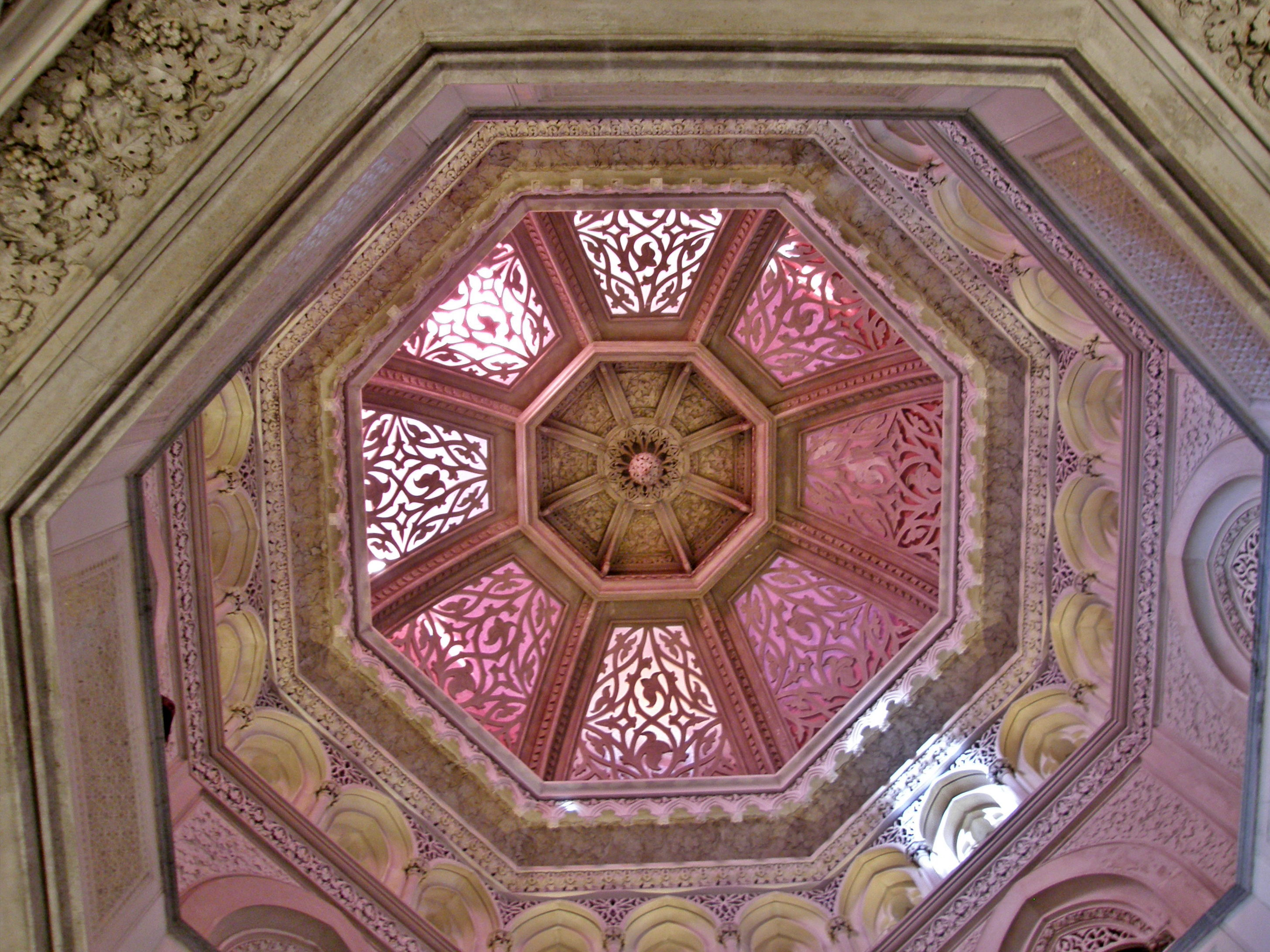
Interior view of the main dome

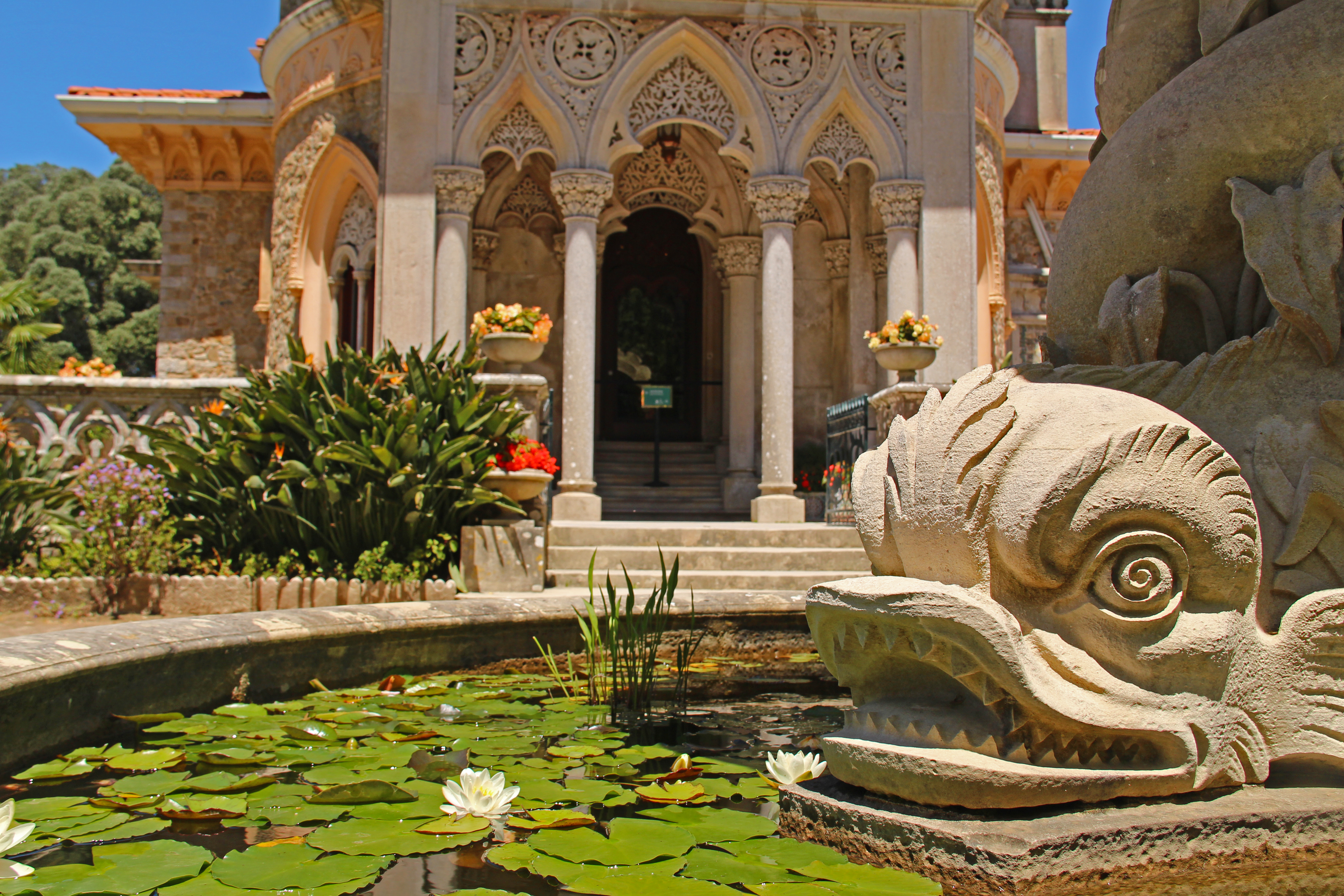
Water fountain outside the Palace

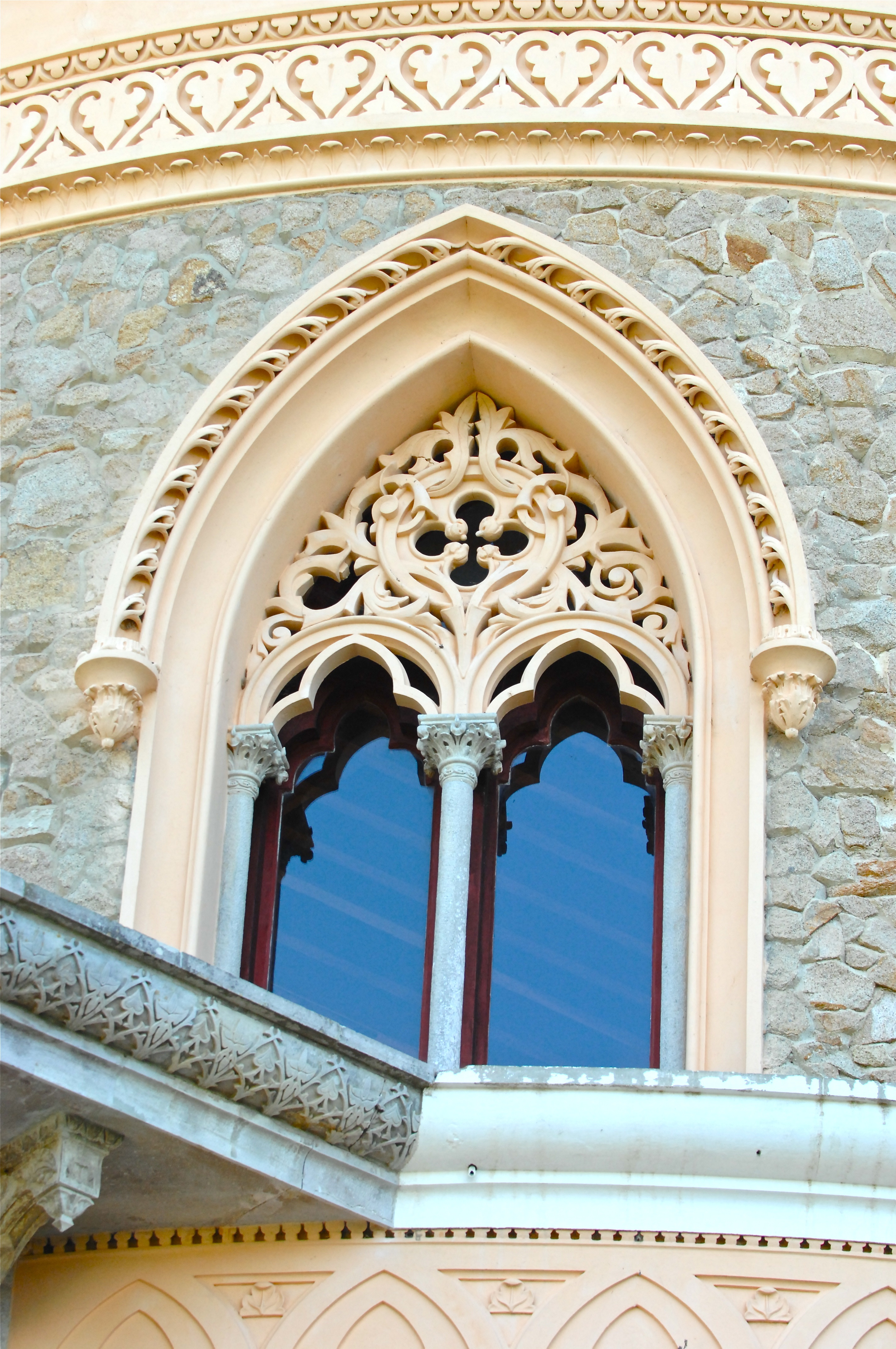
Window of Monserrate Palace

== See also ==
- List of national monuments of Portugal
