= Pena Palace =

Castle in Sintra, Portugal

Coordinates: 38°47′16″N 9°23′26″W

- Palácio da Pena
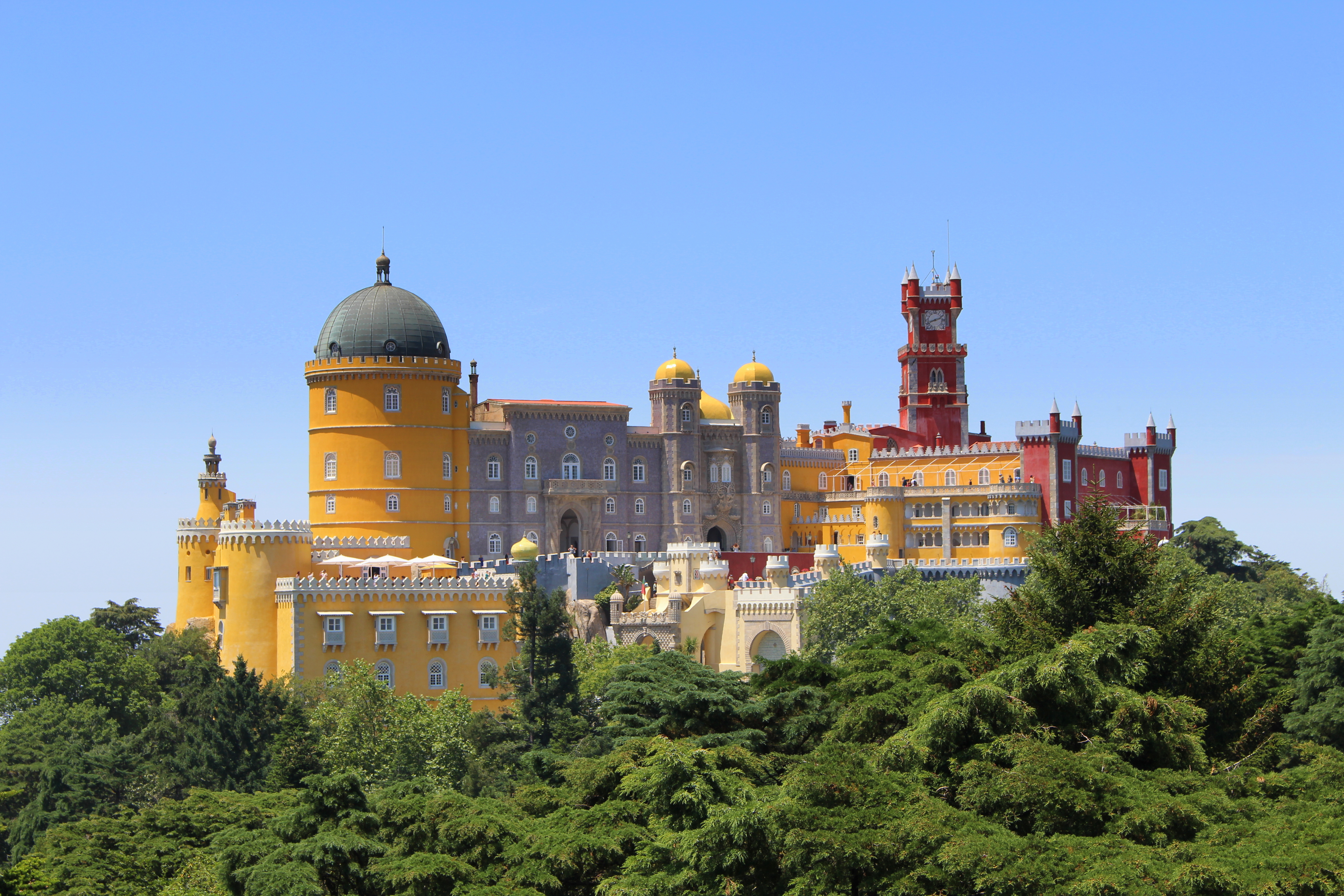

General information
- Architectural style: Romanesque Revival, Neo-Manueline
- Location: Sintra, Portugal
- Construction started: Middle Ages
- Completed: 1854

Design and construction
- Architect: Wilhelm Ludwig von Eschwege
- Other designers: Ferdinand II of Portugal

UNESCO World Heritage Site
- Part of: Cultural Landscape of Sintra
- Criteria: Cultural: (ii), (iv), (v)
- Reference: 723
- Inscription: 1995 (19th Session)

Portuguese National Monument
- Type: Non-movable
- Criteria: National Monument
- Designated: 10 January 1907
- Reference no.: IPA.00006134

The Pena Palace (Portuguese: Palácio da Pena) is a Romanticist palace in São Pedro de Penaferrim, in the municipality of Sintra, on the Portuguese Riviera. The castle stands on the top of a hill in the Sintra Mountains overlooking the town of Sintra, and on a clear day it can be easily seen from Lisbon and much of its metropolitan area. It is a national monument and constitutes one of the major expressions of 19th-century Romanticism in the world. The palace is a UNESCO World Heritage Site and one of the Seven Wonders of Portugal. It is also used for state occasions by the President of the Portuguese Republic and other government officials.

== History ==
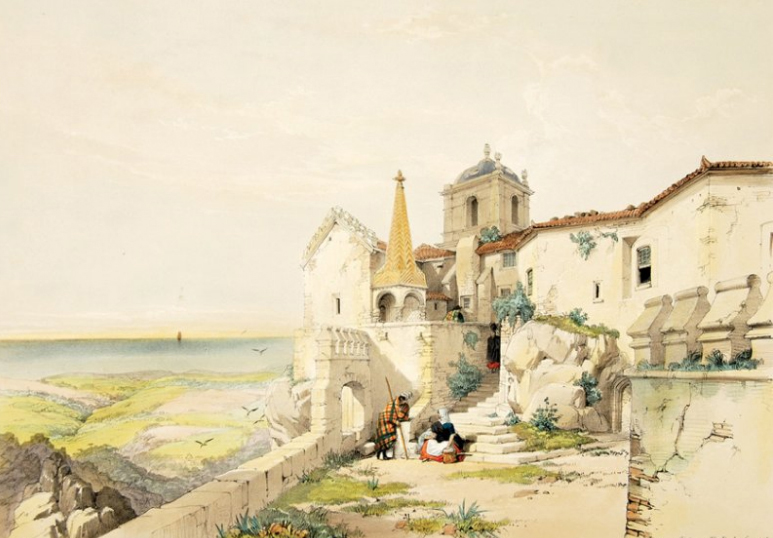
Pena Convent (its former construction) in 1839, by George Vivian.

The castle's history started in the Middle Ages when a chapel dedicated to Our Lady of Pena was built on the top of the hill above Sintra. According to tradition, construction occurred after an apparition of the Virgin Mary.

In 1493, John II, accompanied by his wife Leonor of Viseu, made a pilgrimage to the site to fulfill a vow. His successor, Manuel I, was also very fond of this sanctuary, and ordered the construction of a monastery on this site which was donated to the Order of Saint Jerome. For centuries Pena was a small, quiet place for meditation, housing a maximum of eighteen monks.

In the 18th century the monastery was severely damaged by lightning. However, it was the 1755 Lisbon earthquake, occurring shortly afterwards, that took the heaviest toll on the monastery, reducing it to ruins. Nonetheless, the chapel (and its works of marble and alabaster attributed to Nicolau Chanterene) escaped without significant damage.

For many decades the ruins remained untouched, but they still astonished young Prince Ferdinand. In 1838, as King consort Ferdinand II, he decided to acquire the old monastery, all of the surrounding lands, the nearby Castle of the Moors and a few other estates in the area. King Ferdinand then set out to transform the remains of the monastery into a palace that would serve as a summer residence for the Portuguese royal family. The commission for the Romantic style rebuilding was given to Lieutenant-General and mining engineer Wilhelm Ludwig von Eschwege. Eschwege, a German amateur architect, was much traveled and likely had knowledge of several castles along the Rhine river. The construction took place between 1842 and 1854, although it was almost completed in 1847: King Ferdinand and Queen Maria II intervened decisively on matters of decoration and symbolism. Among others, the King suggested vault arches, Medieval and Islamic elements be included, and he also designed an ornate window for the main façade (inspired by the chapter house window of the Convent of the Order of Christ in Tomar).

After the death of Ferdinand the palace passed into the possession of his second wife Elisa Hensler, Countess of Edla. The latter then sold the palace to King Luís, who wanted to retrieve it for the royal family, and thereafter the palace was frequently used by the family. In 1889 it was purchased by the Portuguese State, and after the Republican Revolution of 1910 it was classified as a national monument and transformed into a museum. The last queen of Portugal, Queen Amélia, spent her last night at the palace before leaving the country in exile.

The palace quickly drew visitors and became one of Portugal's most visited monuments. Over time the colors of the red and yellow façades faded, and for many years the palace was visually identified as being entirely gray. By the end of the 20th century the palace was repainted and the original colors restored.

In 1995, the palace and the rest of the Cultural Landscape of Sintra were classified as a World Heritage Site by UNESCO.

== Architecture ==
A mix of architectural styles

The Pena Palace has a profusion of styles much in accordance with the exotic taste of the Romanticism. The intentional mixture of eclectic styles includes the Neo-Gothic, Neo-Manueline, Neo-Islamic and Neo-Renaissance. Much of this has been evident since major renovations in the 1840s. References to other prominent Portuguese buildings, such as the Belém Tower, are also present.

Almost the entire palace stands on rock in the Sintra Mountains. Structurally, it can be divided in four sections:

- the foundations and its enveloping walls, with two gateways (one of which is protected by a drawbridge)
- the restored structure of the old convent, and the clock tower
- the Arches Yard in front of the chapel, with its wall of Moorish arches
- the palatial zone and its cylindric bastion, with interiors decorated in the cathédrale style.

=== Convent section and clock tower ===
As many elements as possible were preserved of the remains of the Hieronymite convent including the cloister, the dining room, the sacristy, and the Manueline-Renaissance chapel. All were embedded in a new section that featured a wide terrace and a clock tower. The Queen's Terrace is perhaps the best spot for obtaining an overall picture of the architecture of the palace. The terrace features a sundial cannon that used to fire every day at noon. The clock tower was completed in 1843.

== Interior ==
The Chapel

The Royal Dining Room

The Noble Room

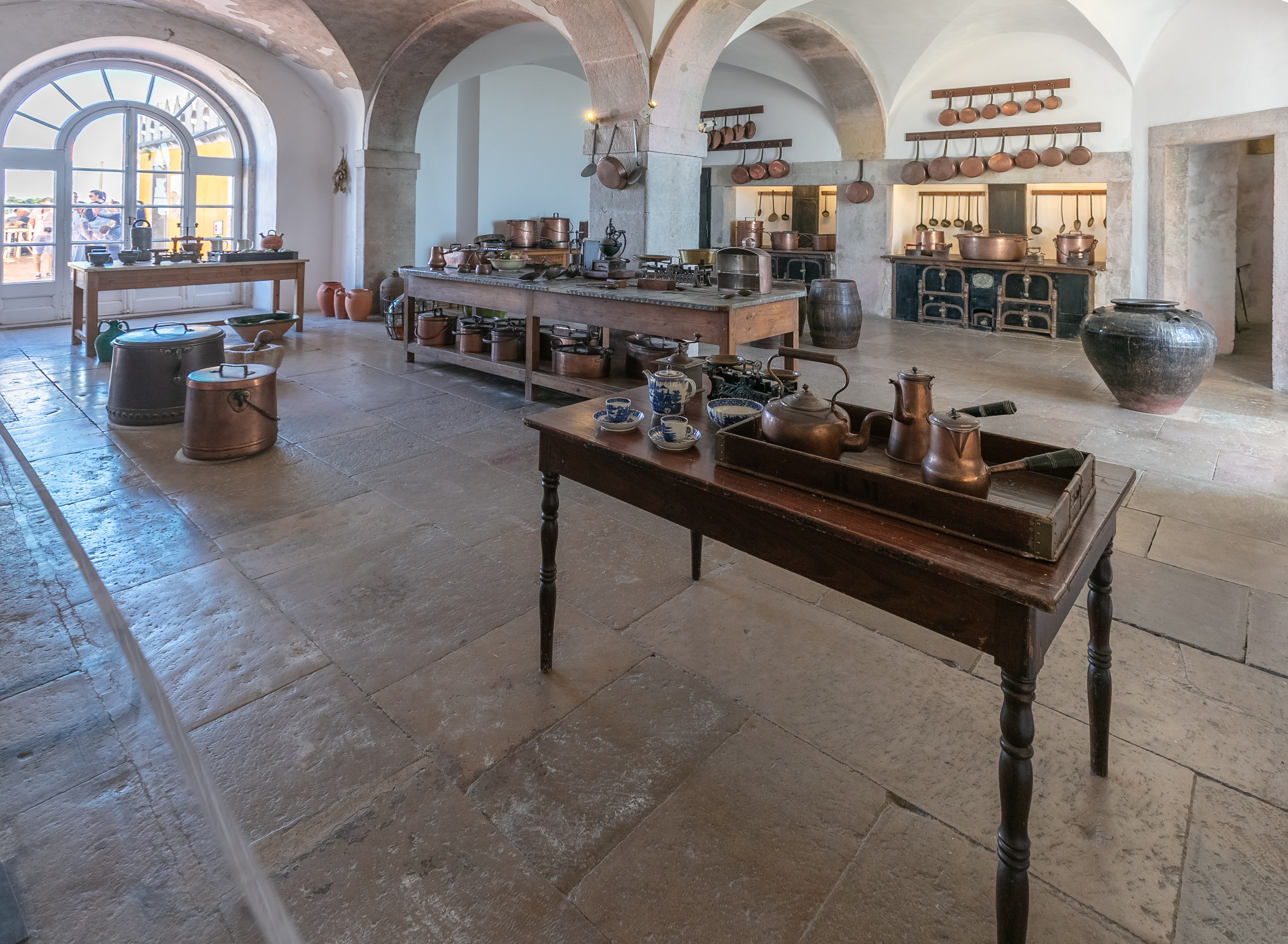
The Kitchen

The interiors of the Pena Palace were adapted to serve as the Summer residence of the royal family. It has amazing stuccos, painted walls in trompe-l'œil and various revetments in tile from the 19th century, forming part of the numerous royal collections.

== Park ==
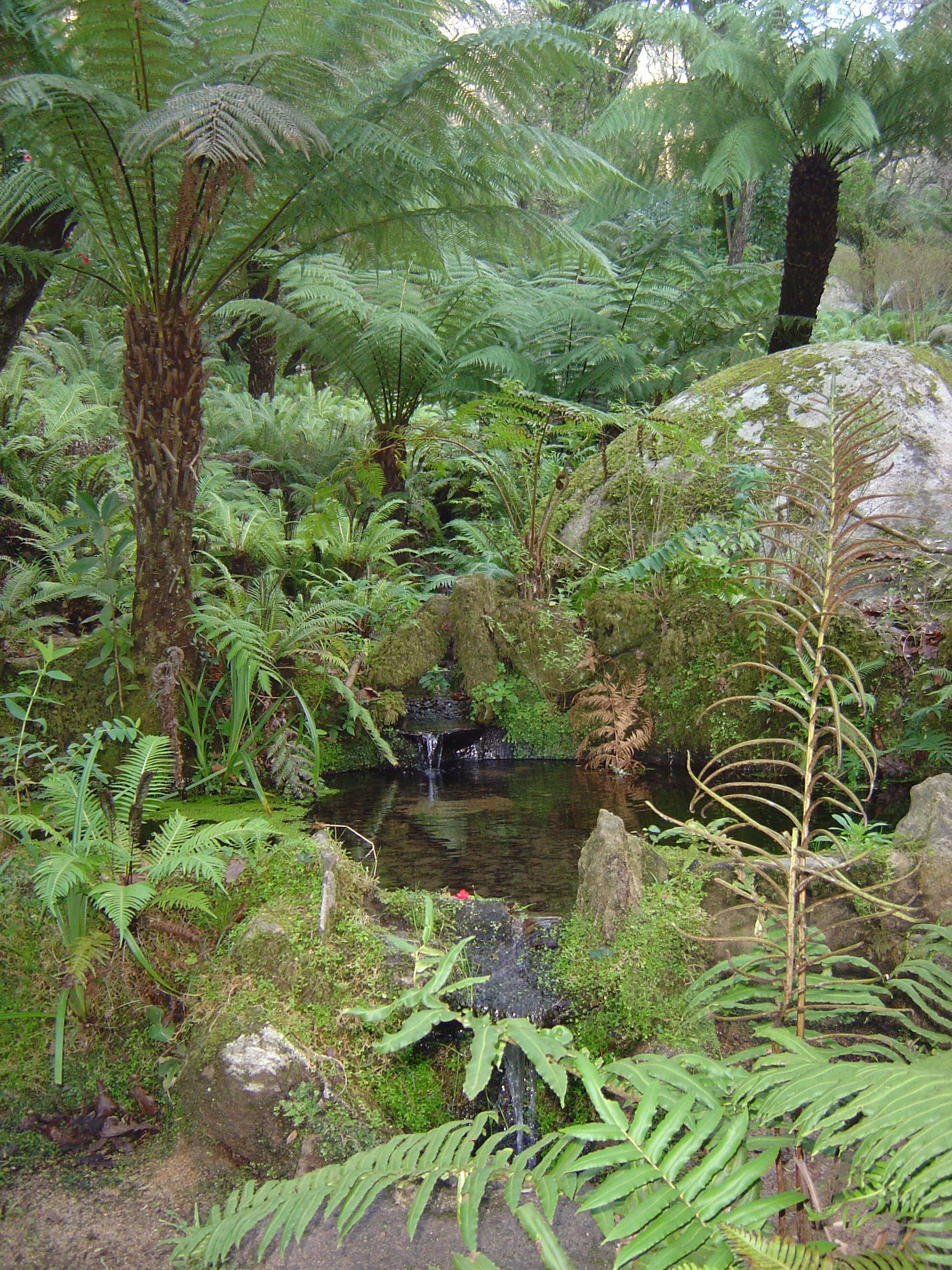
The stream that flows through the Queen's Fern Garden

Pond and duck houses in Pena Park.

The Pena Park is a vast forested area completely surrounding the Pena Palace, spreading for over 200 hectares of uneven terrain. The park was created at the same time as the palace by King Ferdinand II, who was assisted in the task by the Baron von Eschwege and the Baron von Kessler. The exotic taste of the Romanticism was applied to the park as it was to the palace. The King ordered trees from diverse, distant lands to be planted there. Those included North American sequoia, Lawson's cypress, magnolia and Western redcedar, Chinese ginkgo, Japanese Cryptomeria, and a wide variety of ferns and tree ferns from Australia and New Zealand, concentrated in the Queen's Fern Garden (Feteira da Rainha). The park has a labyrinthic system of paths and narrow roads, connecting the palace to the many points of interest throughout the park, as well as to its two gated exits.

== Gallery ==
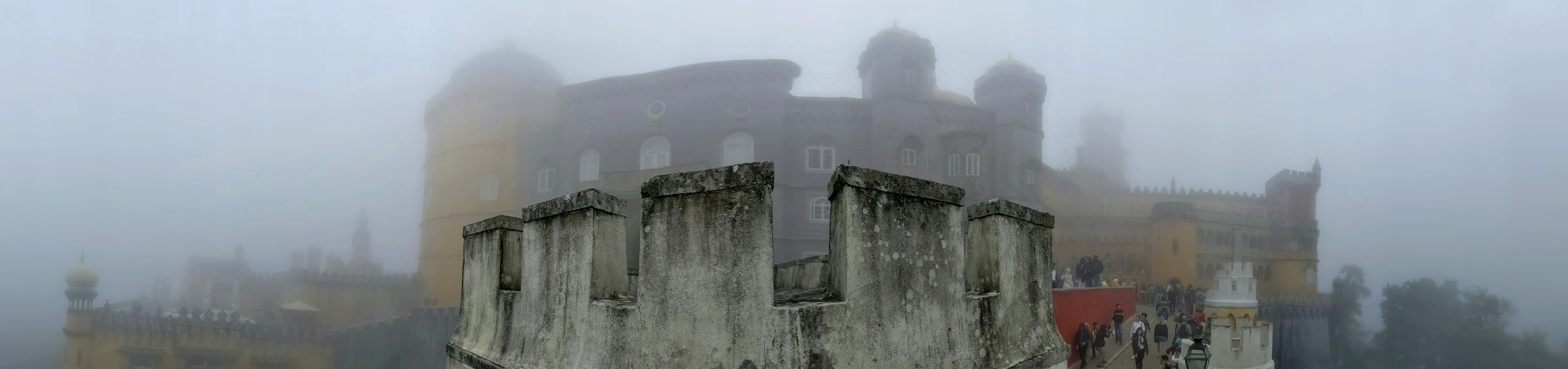
Pena Palace in fog
Triton sculpture beneath a Neo-Manueline window

Courtyard of Arches and clock tower

Neo-Manueline window

Cloister with tiled walls and arcades

Chapel

Chalet of the Countess of Edla

== See also ==
- Monserrate Palace and Quinta do Relógio nearby, built in a similar style
- Arseny Morozov House, Moscow which bears a strong influence of the style
