= São Pedro de Penaferrim =

- Civil parish
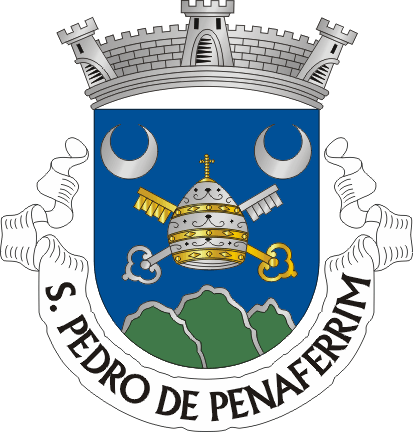
- Coat of arms

- Location in Portugal
- Coordinates: 38.769°N 9.400°W
- Country: Portugal
- Region: Lisbon
- Metropolitan area: Lisbon
- District: Lisbon
- Municipality: Sintra
- Disbanded: 2013

Area
  - Total: 26.97 km^{2} (10.41 sq mi)

Population (2011)
  - Total: 14,001
  - Density: 519.1/km^{2} (1,345/sq mi)
- Time zone: UTC+00:00 (WET)
  - Summer (DST): UTC+01:00 (WEST)

São Pedro de Penaferrim (Portuguese pronunciation: [sɐ̃w ˈpeðɾu ðɨ pɨnɐfɨˈʁĩ]) is a former civil parish in the municipality of Sintra, Lisbon District, Portugal. In 2013, the parish merged into the new parish Sintra (Santa Maria e São Miguel, São Martinho e São Pedro de Penaferrim). The population in 2011 was 14,001, in an area of 26.97 km^{2}. Many of the town of Sintra's historical monuments are located in São Pedro de Penaferrim, including the Pena Palace and the Castle of the Moors.
