= Fort São Brás de Sanxete =

- Forte de São Brás de Sanxete
- Cascais, Portugal
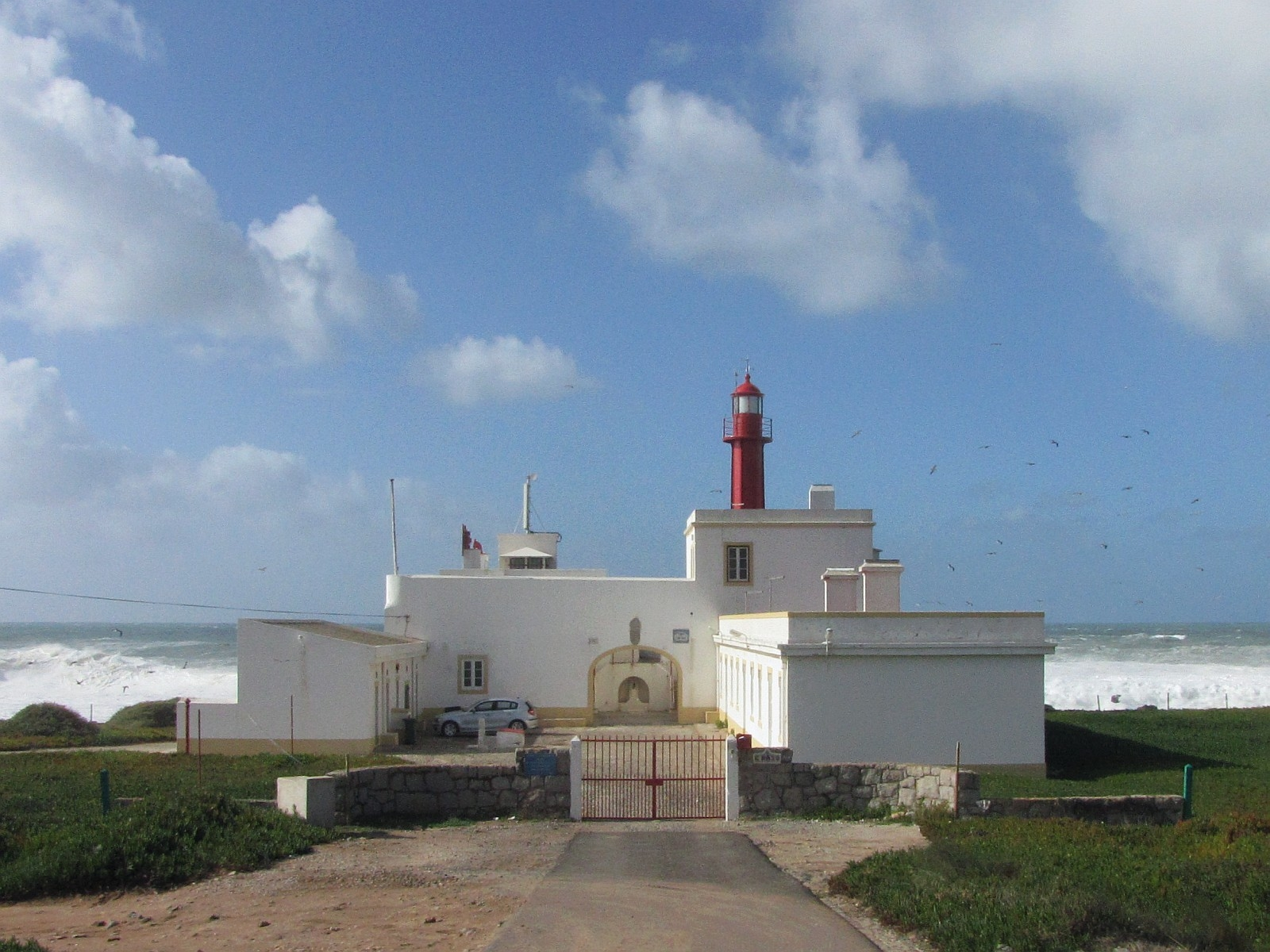
- Fort São Brás de Sanxete

Site information
- Type: Bastion fort
- Condition: Abandoned

Location
- Coordinates: 38°42′34″N 9°29′9″W

Site history
- Built: 1658
- In use: 16th-19th century.

Fort São Brás de Sanxete (Forte de São Brás de Sanxete in Portuguese) is located in Cabo Raso, parish and municipality of Cascais, district of Lisbon, in Portugal.

== History ==
This small coastal fort was built as a lookout, during the reign of King John IV of Portugal in 1658, according to a stone inscription once found above the gate. It crossed fires with Crismina Fort, in defense of Guincho beach, a vast stretch of sand where enemy vessels could easily disembark troops.

In 1720 it had a 3 soldiers and two gunner garrison, 4 iron 12 caliber guns, though unserviceable. In 1777 it had 6 serviceable iron 16 caliber pieces.

In 1894, having lost its defensive function, it housed a lighthouse, which is still in operation today.

This property, in the area of influence of the Sintra-Cascais Natural Park, is currently awaiting classification with the Portuguese Institute of Architectural Heritage (IPPAR) awaiting instructions from the Cascais city hall.

Currently, the fort houses the Cabo Raso Lighthouse, and its service dependencies are used to service the lighthouse. The current red-painted iron tower, adjacent to the lighthouse keepers house, dates from 1915, and its lighthouse has a range of twenty nautical miles or about 37 km.

== Gallery ==
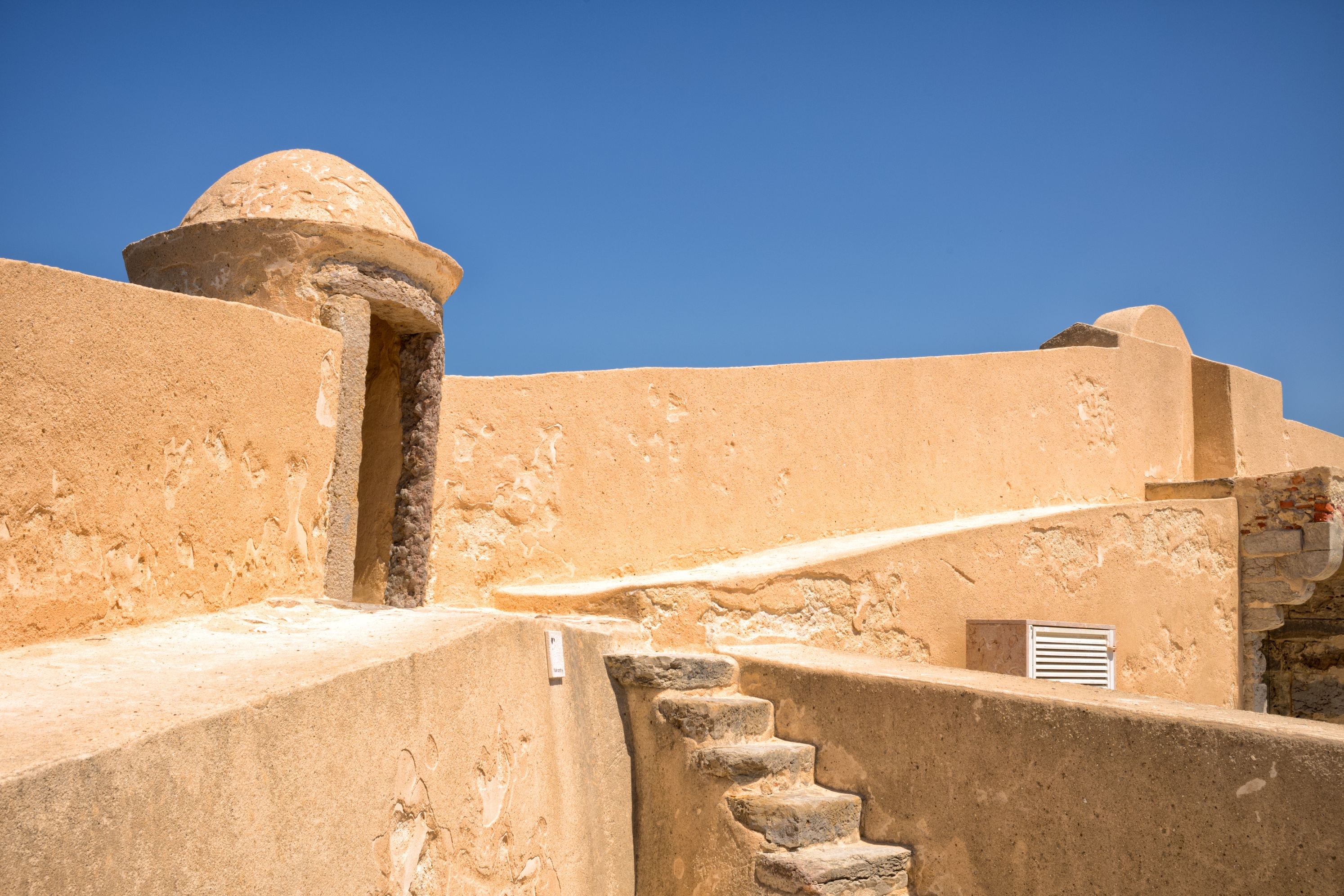

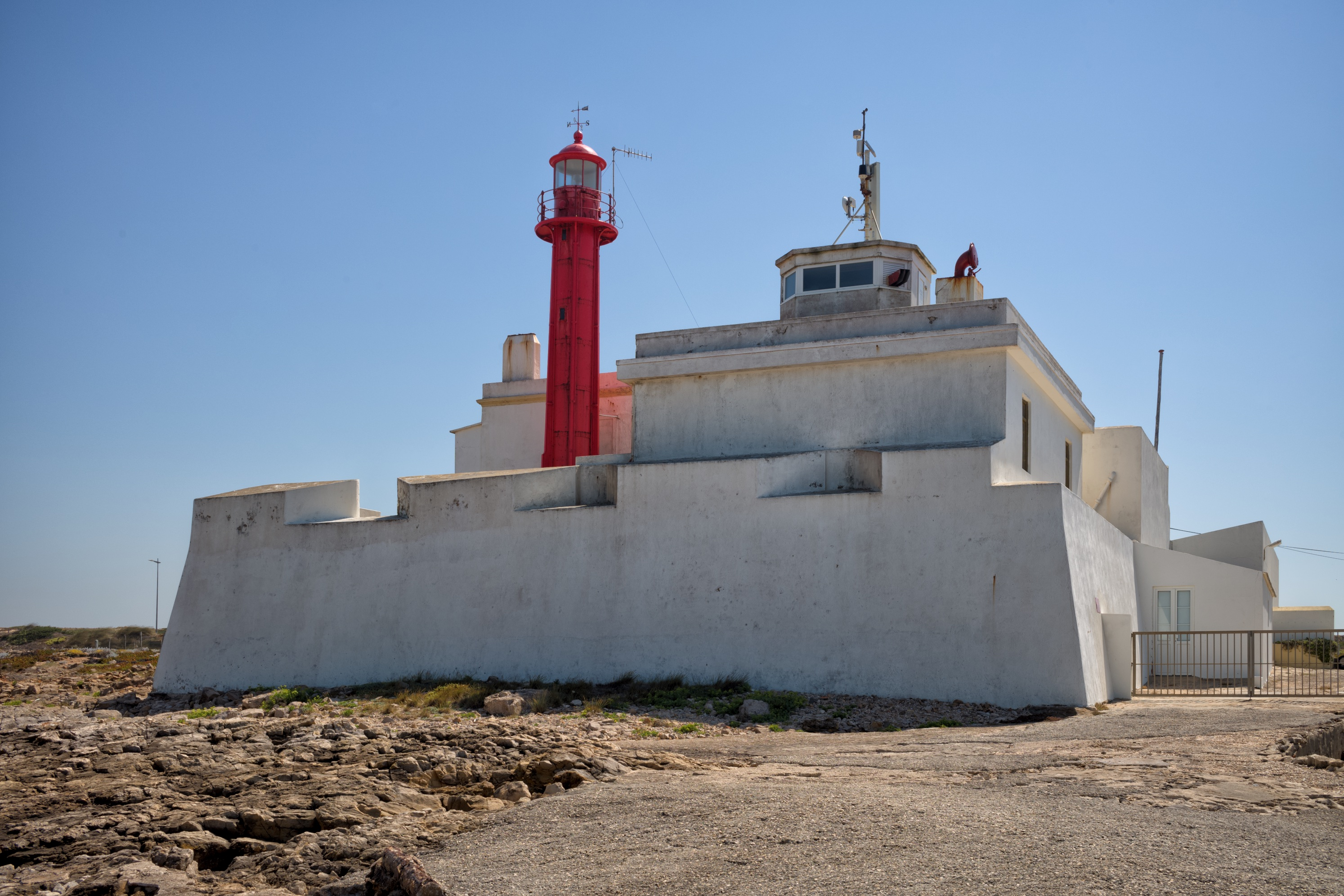

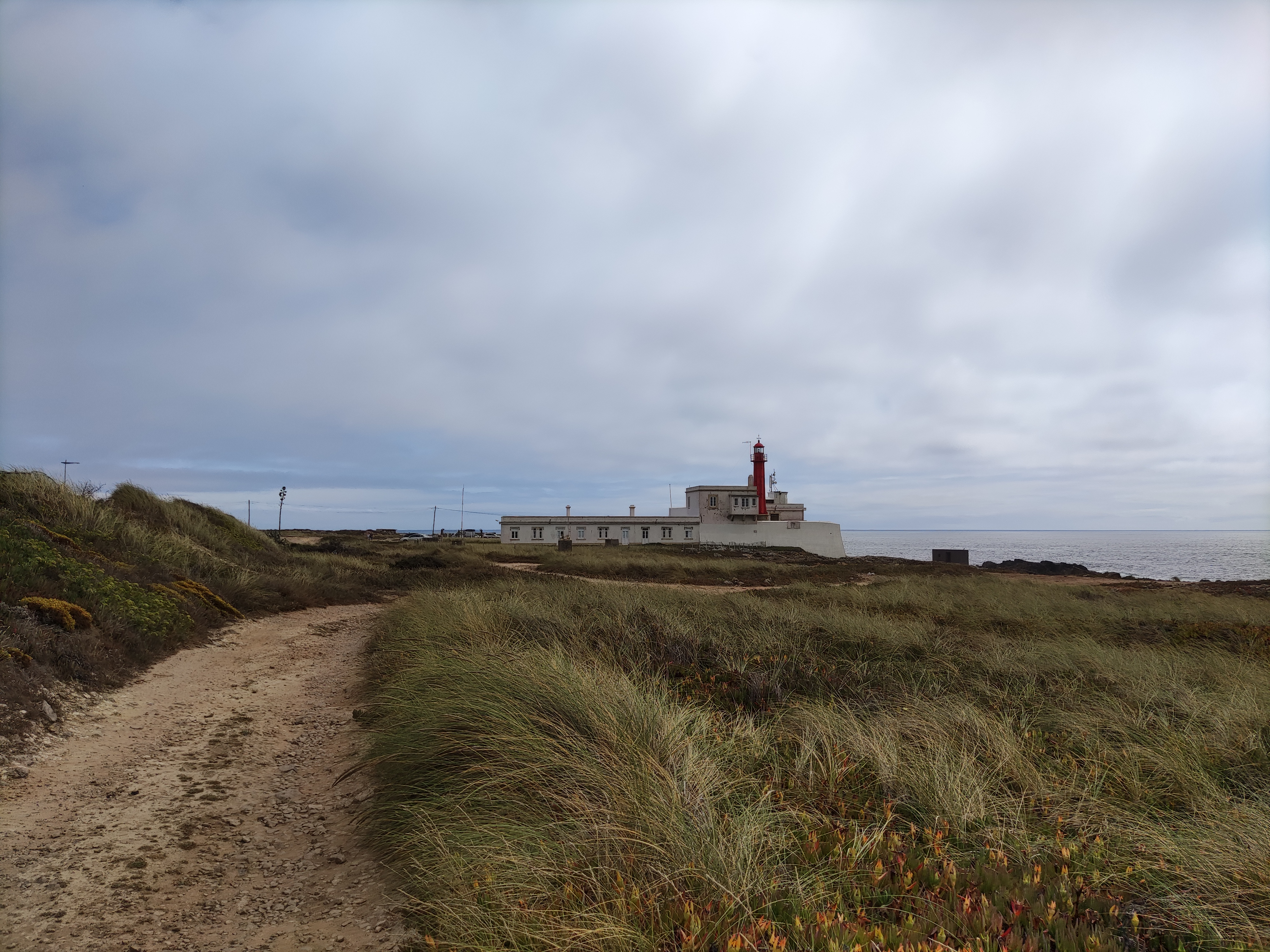

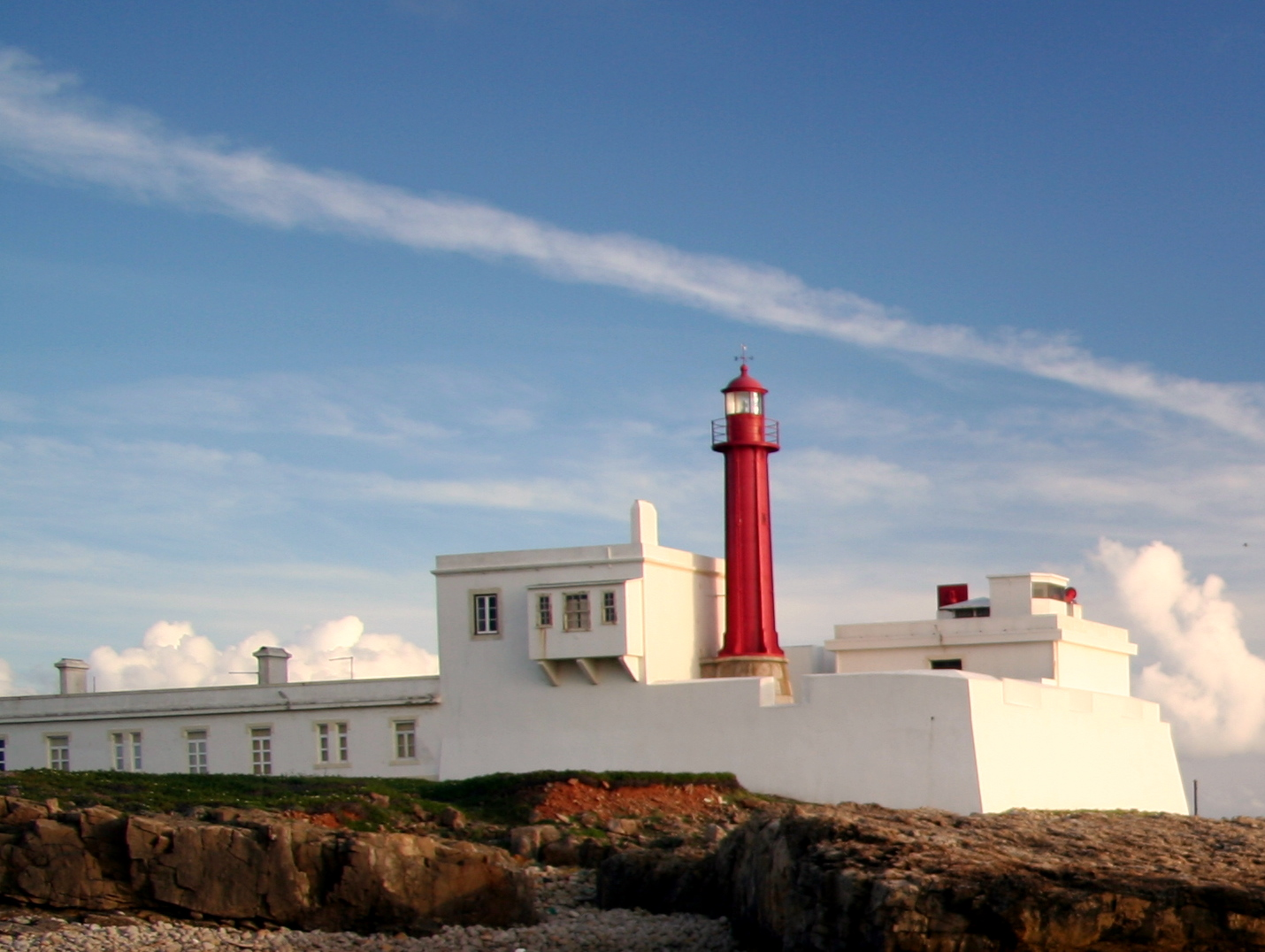
