= Sanctuary of Peninha =

Baroque chapel and 20th Century palace near Sintra, Portugal

Coordinates: 38°46′06″N 9°27′37″W

The Sanctuary of Peninha (Portuguese: Santuário da Peninha) is situated in the Sintra Mountains in the Sintra-Cascais Natural Park, in the Lisbon District of Portugal. It stands at an altitude of 448 metres on top of a rocky outcrop, which provides views over the coastline and inland areas. In addition to a baroque chapel, completed in 1710, the location contains the Palace of Peninha, which dates from 1918, as well as remains of a hermitage. The interiors of neither the chapel nor the palace can presently be visited.

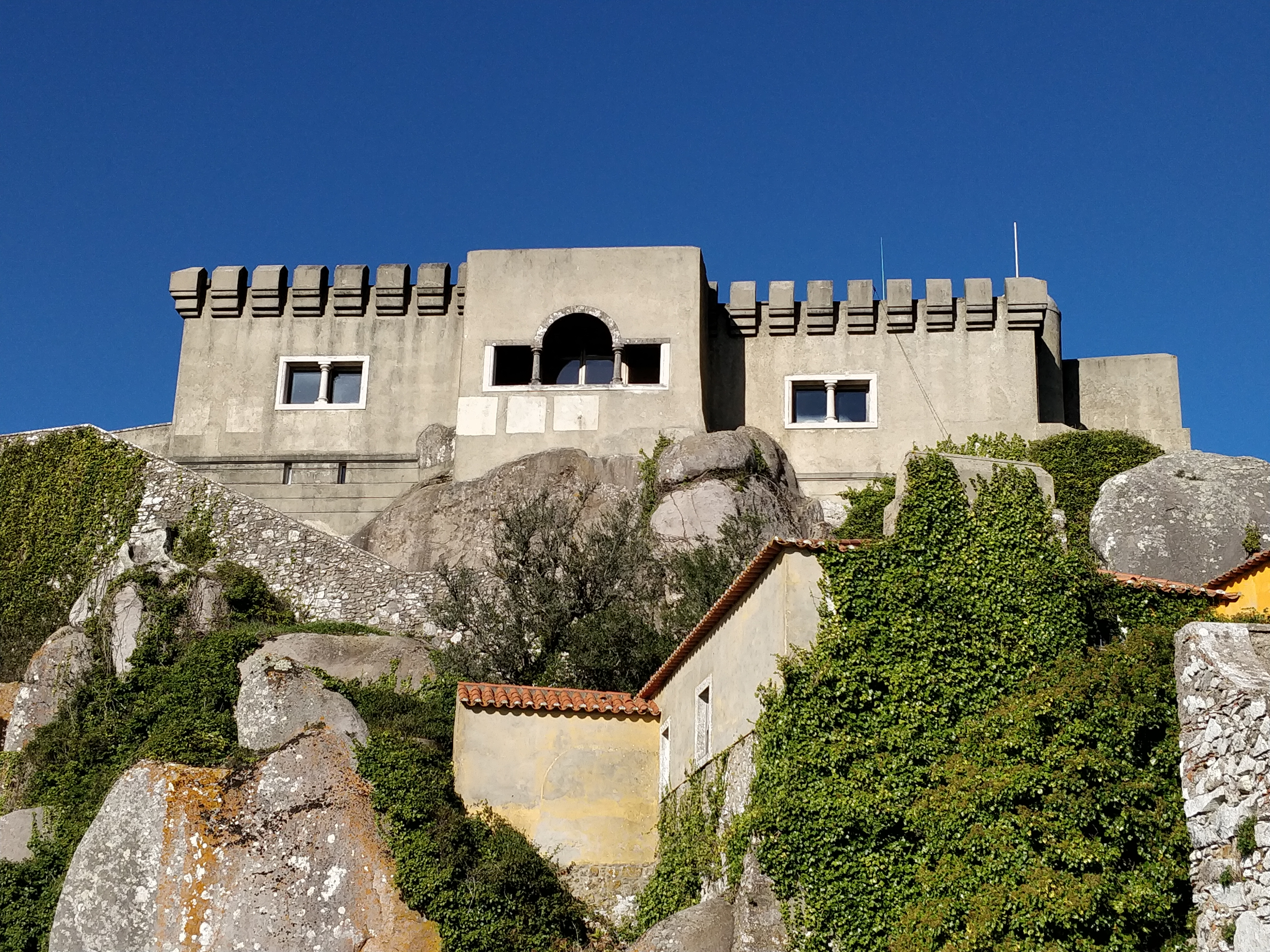
View of the Sanctuary of Peninha, near Sintra in Portugal. The chapel of Nossa Senhora da Peninha is in the foreground with the 20th Century house (or palace) on the hill above.

== History ==
The Peninha hills had been the location for a small hermitage ever since the foundation of Christianity in Portugal. Evidence of the physical foundations of a medieval hermitage can still be seen and archaeological excavations carried out by the Sintra–Cascais Natural Park uncovered a necropolis made up of graves excavated in the rock, with burials dating from the end of the 12th century, together with a cistern dug into the rock. The Hermitage of San Saturnino was built on the site in the mid-sixteenth century, added to in the seventeenth century and used by monks until the dissolution of the monasteries in Portugal in 1834. It was still occupied by farmers until the 1960s, when it passed to being used as a barn.

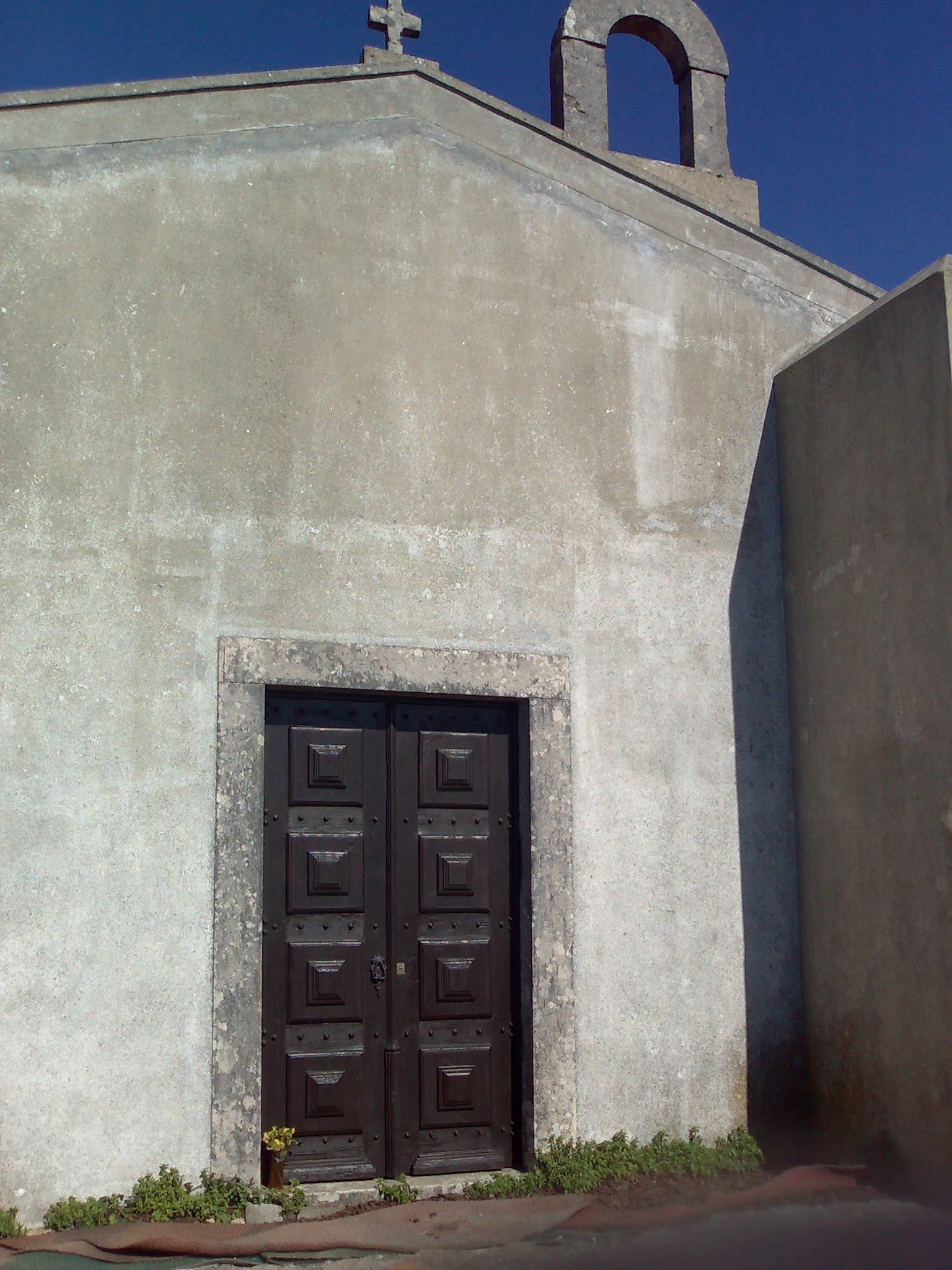
Entrance to the chapel

The site became popular during the rule of King John III of Portugal (1521 - 1557) as one where the Virgin Mary appeared to a young shepherdess. Following earlier attempts to build a chapel after the vision, the present Chapel of Nossa Senhora da Penha was constructed by the monks around a century after the apparition, with financial assistance from King Dom Pedro II and was completed in 1711. Inscriptions inside the chapel on the 1726 grave of the hermit, Pedro da Conceição, and elsewhere, acknowledge his role in building the chapel. The interior of the chapel, which is considered an excellent example of baroque architecture in Portugal, is entirely covered by tiled panels representing scenes of the life of the Virgin Mary, together with representations of the Pentecost and the childhood of Jesus. There are also marble inlays. Given its altitude of 448 metres and difficulty of access, visiting the sanctuary became a form of penance, as well as a popular pilgrimage site for sailors’ families, who would both pray for the safe return of the sailors and try to see returning ships from the summit, which gives visibility out to sea of up to 50 kilometres.

In 1892 Peninha was purchased by the first Count of Almedina. The final construction at Peninha was a mansion built by the Portuguese entomologist and businessman António Augusto Carvalho Monteiro, who also built the Quinta da Regaleira in nearby Sintra. The uncompleted house followed the Romanticism style. It was never lived in as Carvalho Monteiro died before its completion. His original plan had been to build a smaller version of the Pena Palace in Sintra. In Portuguese “pena” means “rock outcrop”, while “peninha” refers to a smaller outcrop. On his death the property was sold to Dr. José Maria Ferreira Rangel de Sampaio who requested an architect to prepare designs to finalize the work of the palace. However, work was not carried out and on the death of Dr. Sampaio he left the palace to the University of Coimbra. The entire complex of 62 hectares was purchased by the Government in 1991 and was placed under the management of the Portuguese Institute for Nature Conservation and Forests.

In June 2017 it was announced that agreement had been reached for the Sintra Parks to carry out rehabilitation of the Sanctuary of Peninha. The agreement foresees the elaboration of a Management Plan to promote nature conservation and education, together with improved security and maintenance of the complex. It is also planned to better link other nearby places of interest in the Sintra mountains with the sanctuary, such as Anta de Adrenunes, the Convent of the Capuchos, and Cabo da Roca.
