= Fort of Cresmina =

Building in Cascais, Lisbon District, Portugal

- Forte da Cresmina
- Lisbon, Near Cascais in Portugal
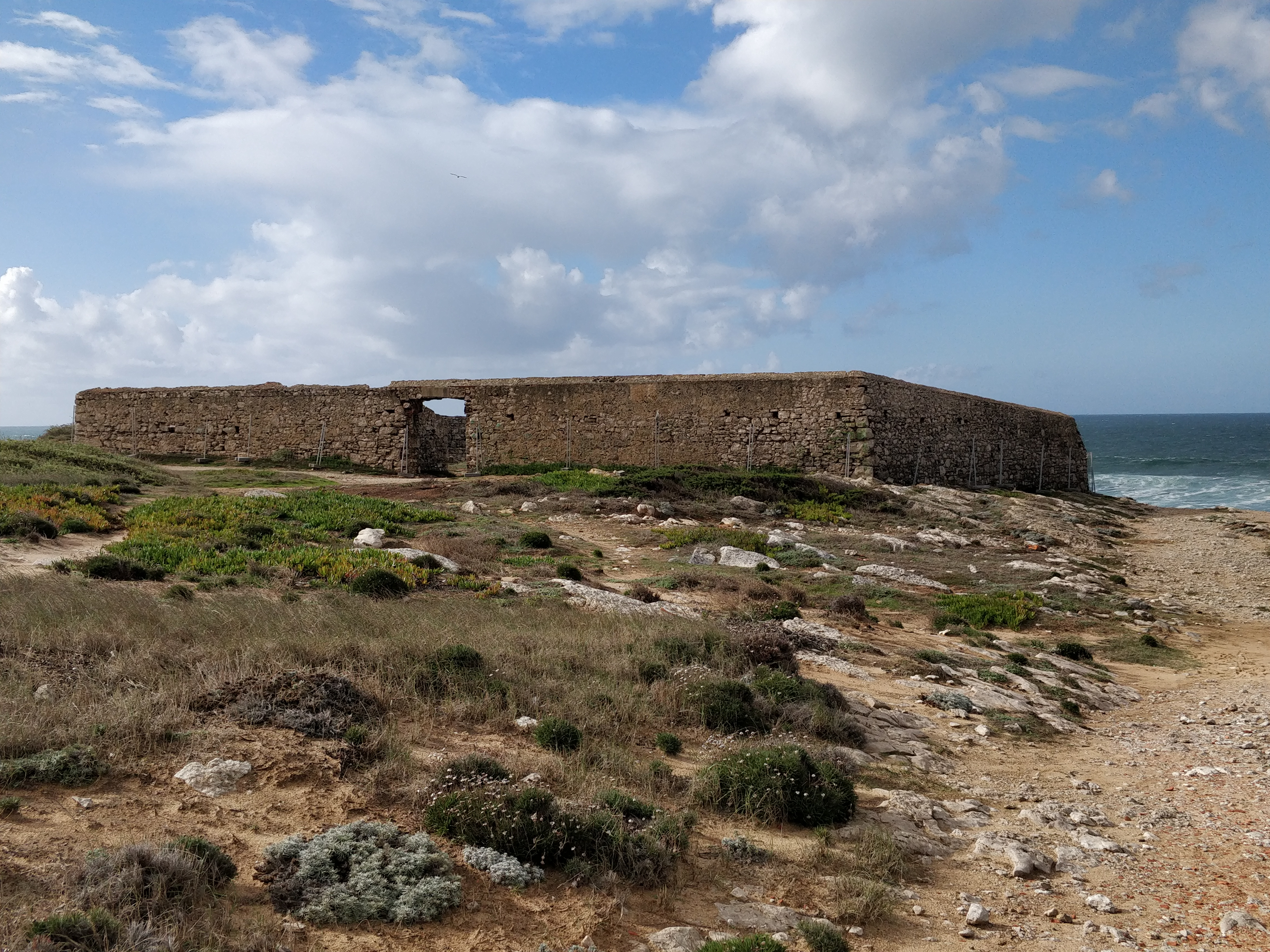
- The remains of Cresmina fort

Site information
- Type: Fort
- Owner: Private

Location
- Coordinates: 38°43′22″N 9°28′42″W

Site history
- Built: 1762
- Materials: Masonry

The Fort of Cresmina (Portuguese: Forte da Cresmina), also known as the Fort of Crismina, is located at the southern end of Cresmina beach, in the municipality of Cascais, Lisbon District, in Portugal. Originally built in 1762 to protect Cresmina beach from landings, it was transferred to private ownership in 1889. As of 2021 it was in the process of being converted into a restaurant.

== History ==
During the so-called Fantastic War (1762-1763) between Portugal and Spain and the simultaneous Seven Years’ War that involved most European powers, three support batteries were built under the guidance of the Count of Schaumburg-Lippe on the 2 kilometer stretch of coastline covering Cresmina Beach and Guincho Beach on the west coast of Portugal, north of the River Tagus estuary. Their main objective was to provide quarters for small garrisons that could hinder the landing of Franco-Spanish forces via the beaches, where troops could be easily landed. This would allow time for the alarm to be raised to enable critical points in the defence of Lisbon, 30km away, to be reinforced. The Cresmina battery was the most southerly of the three batteries and, in addition to protecting the beaches, also crossed fire with the Fort of São Brás de Sanxete.

Rebuilding was carried out in 1793. The fort was not used during the Peninsular War (1807-1814), and it was gradually abandoned, being deactivated in the early 1820s. During the Portuguese Civil War (1828-1834), Miguel I of Portugal ordered its restoration and expansion, and this was carried out between 1830 and 1832. However, on July 24, 1833, it was disarmed and abandoned when the army of Miguel I withdrew, and later, after the civil war, it fell into ruins. In 1850 funds were made available for its repair, but nothing was done. By 1854 the fort was in an advanced state of ruin.

Cresmina fort was put up for auction in 1895. Ownership was subsequently transferred several times and in 1908 it was purchased by António Augusto Carvalho Monteiro and inherited by his descendants on his death. Although the structure still remains, it presented obvious signs of ruin until work began in 2020 to convert it into a restaurant.

== See also ==
- List of forts
