= Cabo Raso =

Cape in western coastal Portugal

- Cape
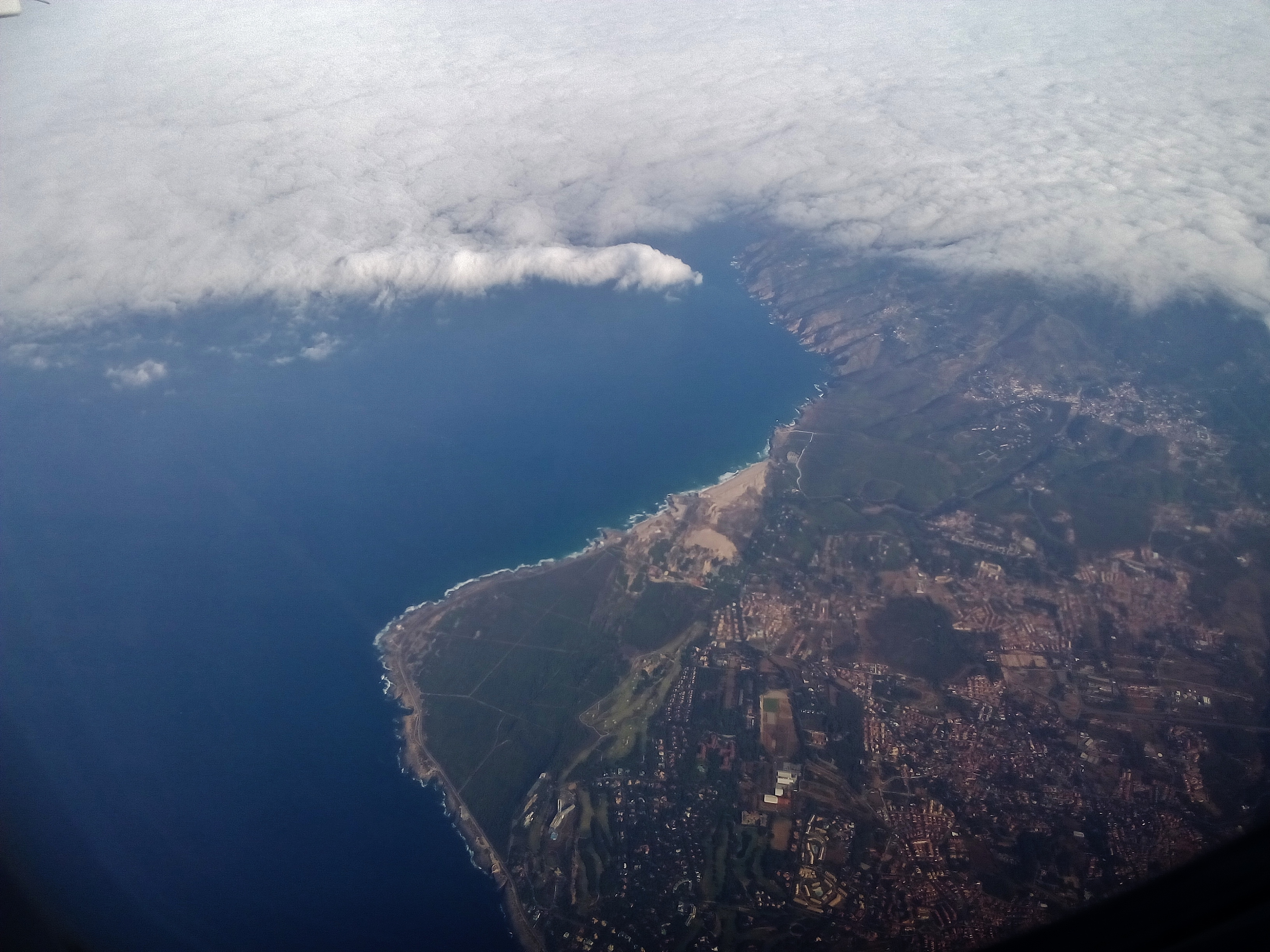
- Aerial view of the cape and Guincho Beach

- Coordinates: 38°42′33.6″N 9°29′6″W
- Location: Portugal, Cascais
- Part of: Sintra-Cascais Natural Park
- Offshore water bodies: Atlantic Ocean
- Etymology: Raso: Portuguese for shallow/flat

Cabo Raso (Cape Raso) is a cape along the coast of Cascais in western coastal Portugal.

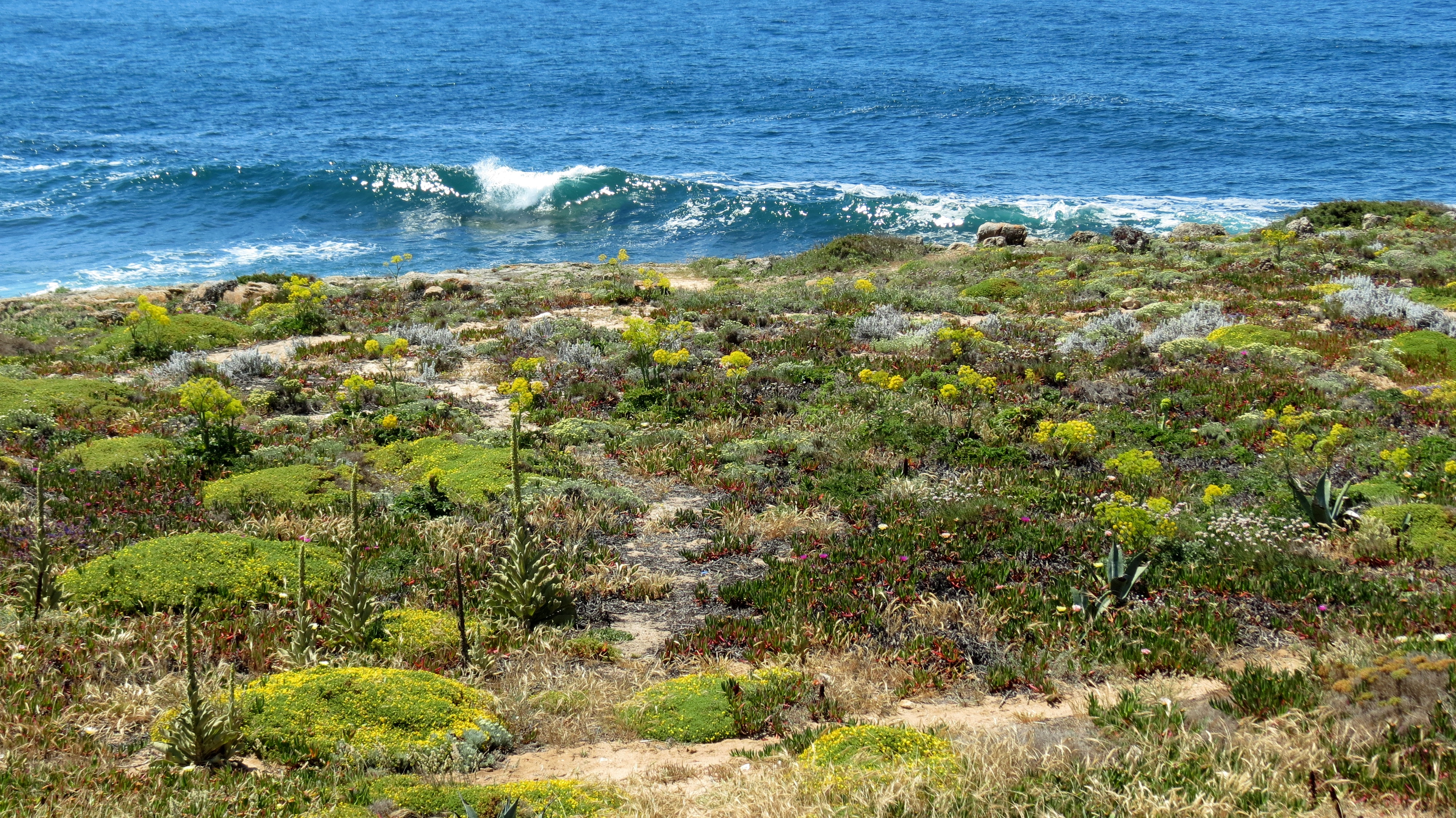
Flora of the cape

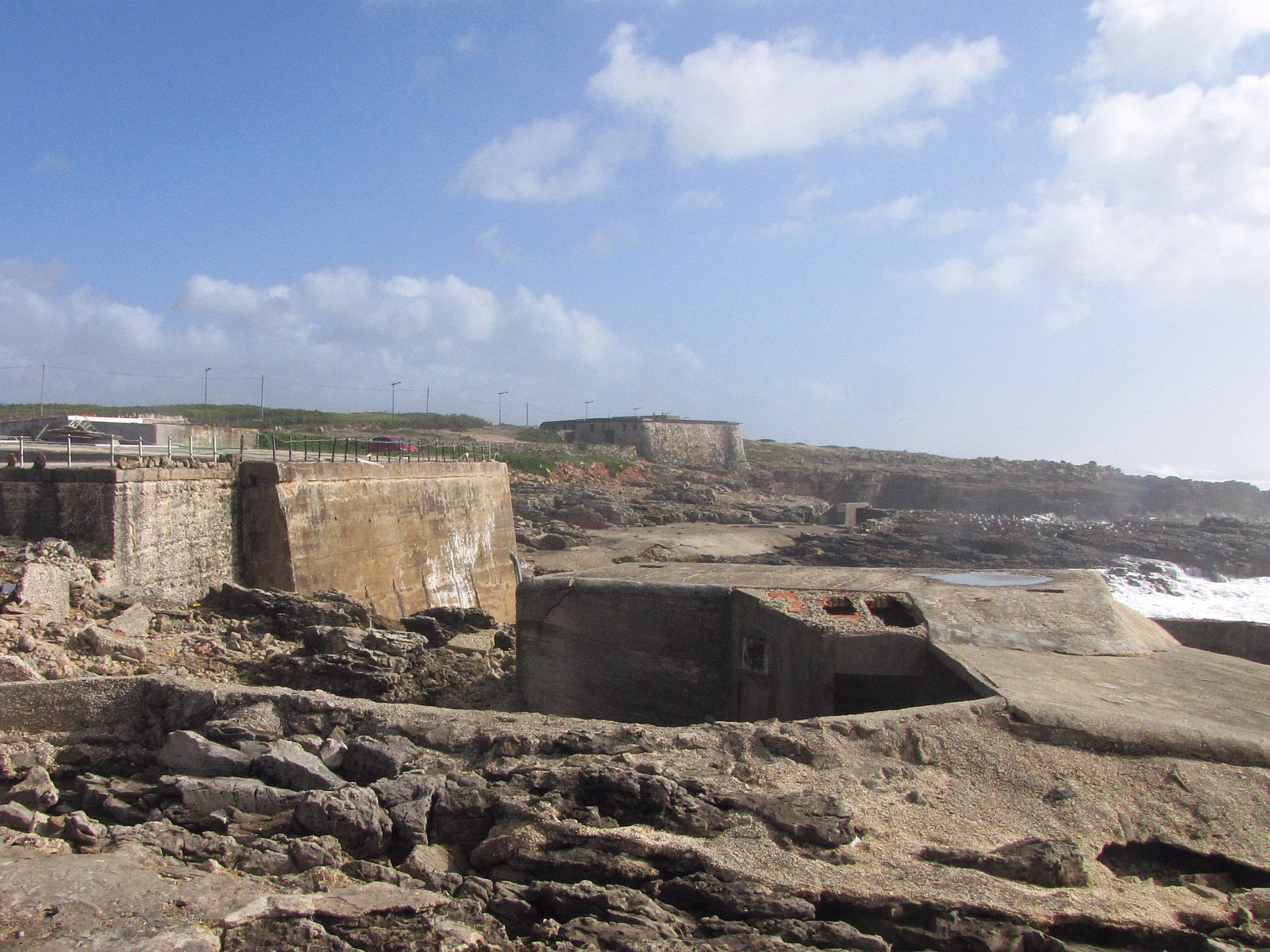
Bunker

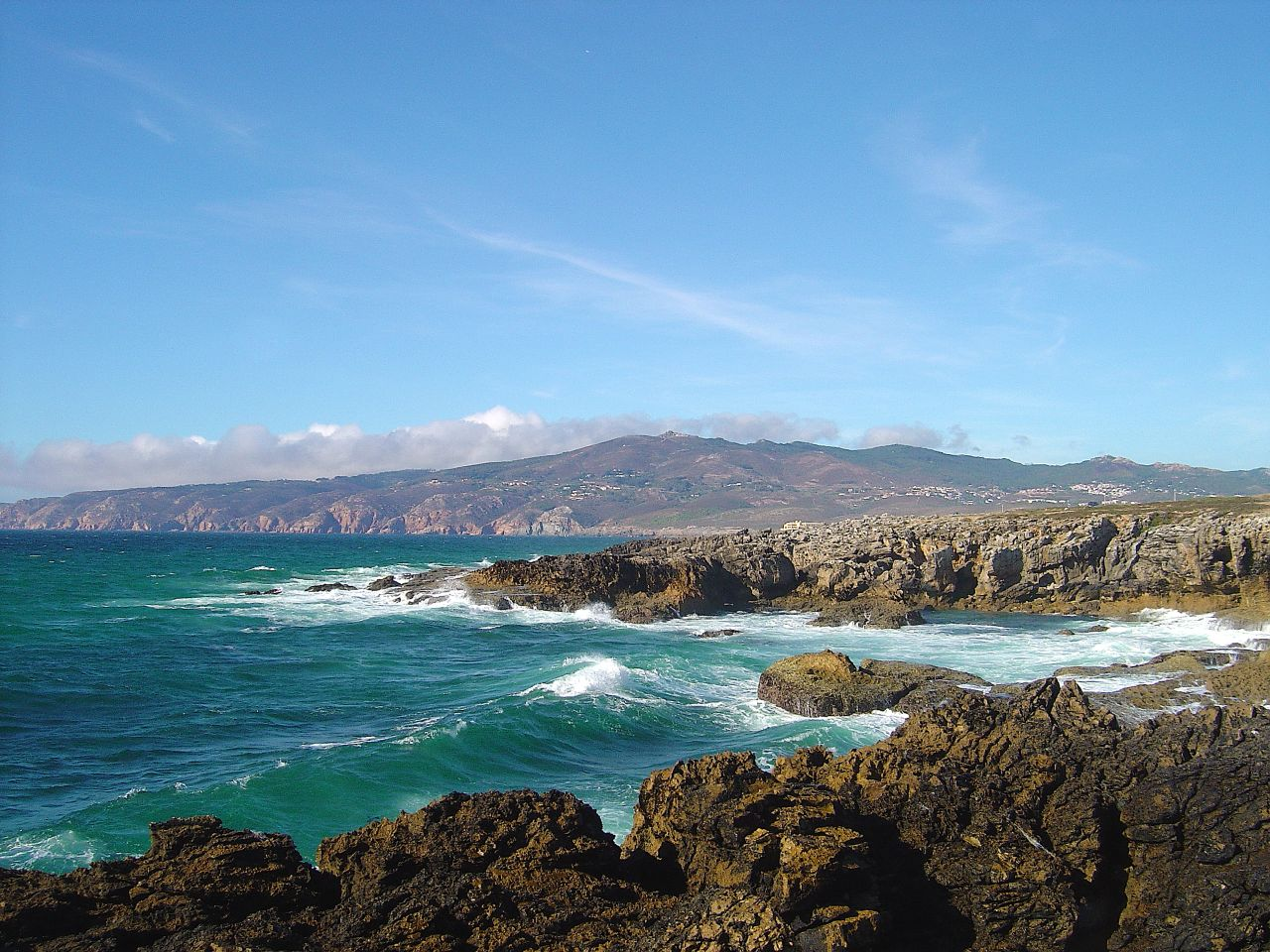
View of Sintra-Cascais Natural Park from the cape

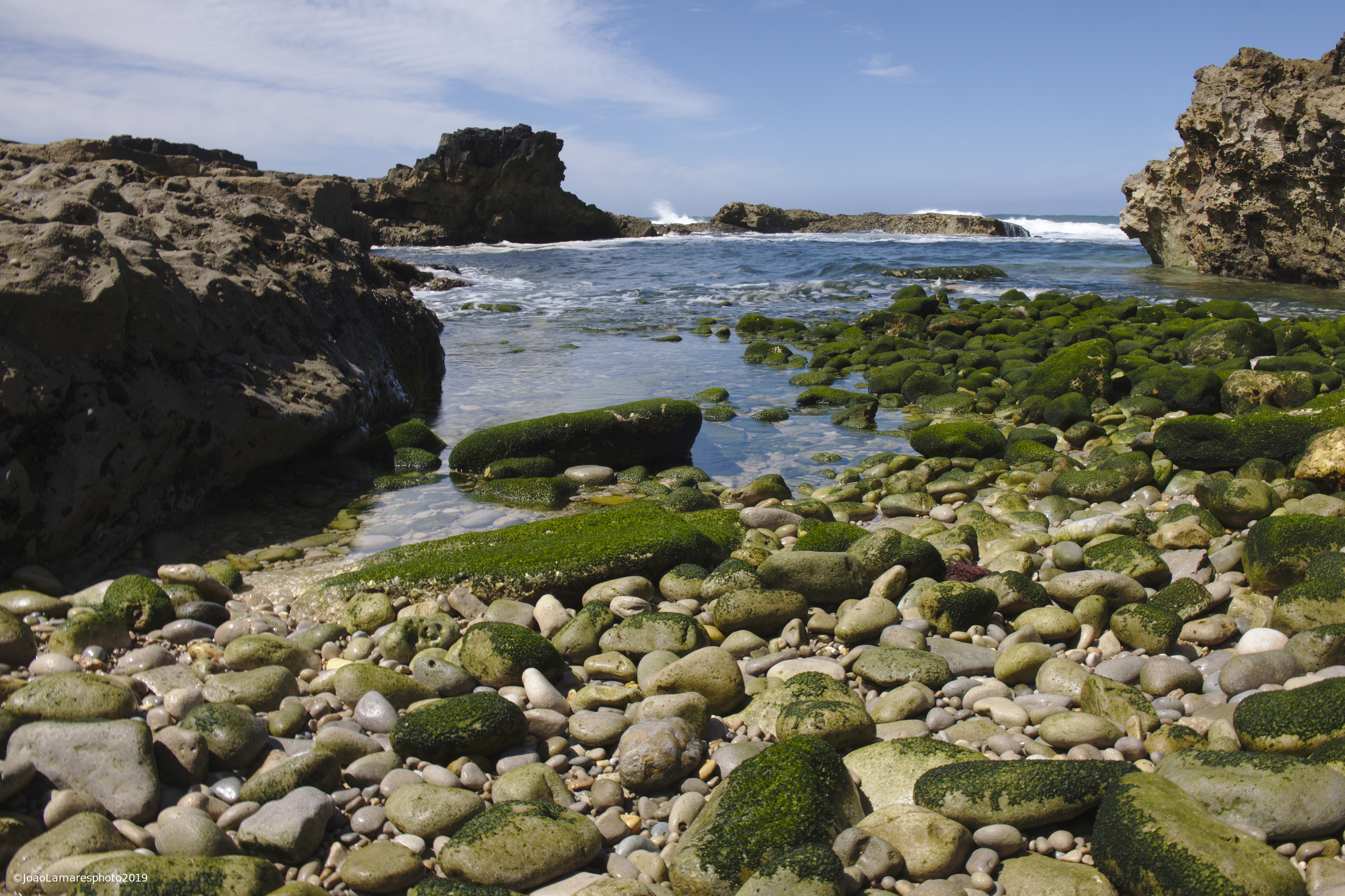
Pebble beach of the cape

== See also ==
- Cabo Raso Lighthouse
