= Fort of Guincho =

Historic building in Portugal

- Forte do Guincho
- Lisbon, Greater Lisbon, Lisbon in Portugal
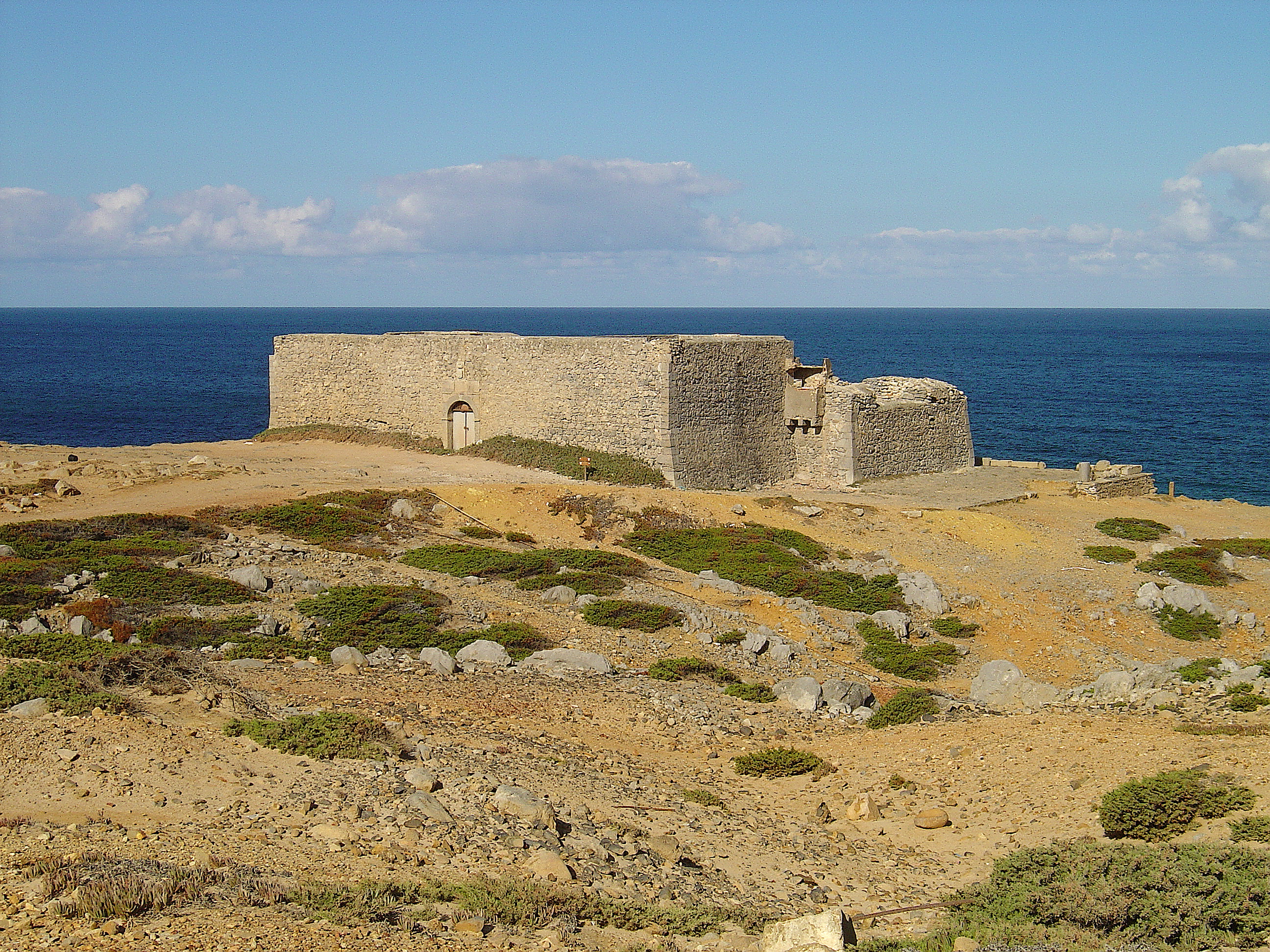
- The rectangular strong-house of Guincho on the edge of the rocky outcroppings of Abano beach

Site information
- Type: Fort
- Owner: Portuguese Republic
- Operator: Câmara Municipal de Cascais
- Open to the public: Public

Location
- Coordinates: 38°44′23.61″N 9°28′23.85″W

Site history
- Built: c. 1640
- Materials: Masonry

The Fort of Guincho, also known as the Fort of Velas, is located at the edge of the Praia do Abano, along the southern edge of the coast of the civil parish of Alcabideche, in Cascais Municipality, Lisbon District, Portugal.. It was classified as Property of Public Interest (Portuguese: Imóvel de Interesse Público) by the national government on 29 September 1977, but today stands in a state of decay, even after studies to remodel the location as a visitors centre for the nearby Sintra-Cascais Nature Park.

== History ==
Construction of the fort took place during the 1640s, with it becoming integrated into a group of fortifications that formed a defensive belt along the Cascais coast to the north of the River Tagus estuary. Construction was ordered by António Luís de Meneses, governor of Cascais during the post-Restoration era. It was a strategic point north of the Tagus River, and used to watch for ships on the high-seas and protect against disembarkation on Guincho beach. Its cannons intersected with those of the battery of Galé to the south of the beach, the site of which is now covered by a hotel.

The first reference to a completed fort guarding the coast in this area dates back to 1675, in an inspection report that indicated that the fortification was guarded by the 3rd Cascais regiment and supported by seven cannons. A similar survey report by architect Mateus do Couto was completed in 1693.

In a report dated 29 June 1720, Colonel João Xavier Teles documented the extent of repairs necessary to maintain the walls and quarters and to replace the main gate and bunkers. Although he provided quotes as to these costs, there are no indications as to whether the projects were completed. At the time of this assessment, the garrison was composed of a commander, three soldiers and two artillery gunmen, placed in weekly rotation. The artillery pieces, which included one iron (out of use) and two bronze (operational) cannon, were considered inadequate by the Colonel, who urged that four new cannon should be sent to the fort to reinforce the garrison. In 1751 and 1758, there were new references to the inadequacy of the post, referring to the need to repair the walls of the fortification, the chimneys in the kitchens, the guardhouse and the barracks. At the time of the latter report, only two cannons continued to be operational. But, to some degree, this had changed by 1777 when the fort was, generally, reported to be in a good state of repair, although it required some small repairs to the quarters and cistern. The garrison at the time included a commander and three soldiers and had been upgraded to include five iron cannon.

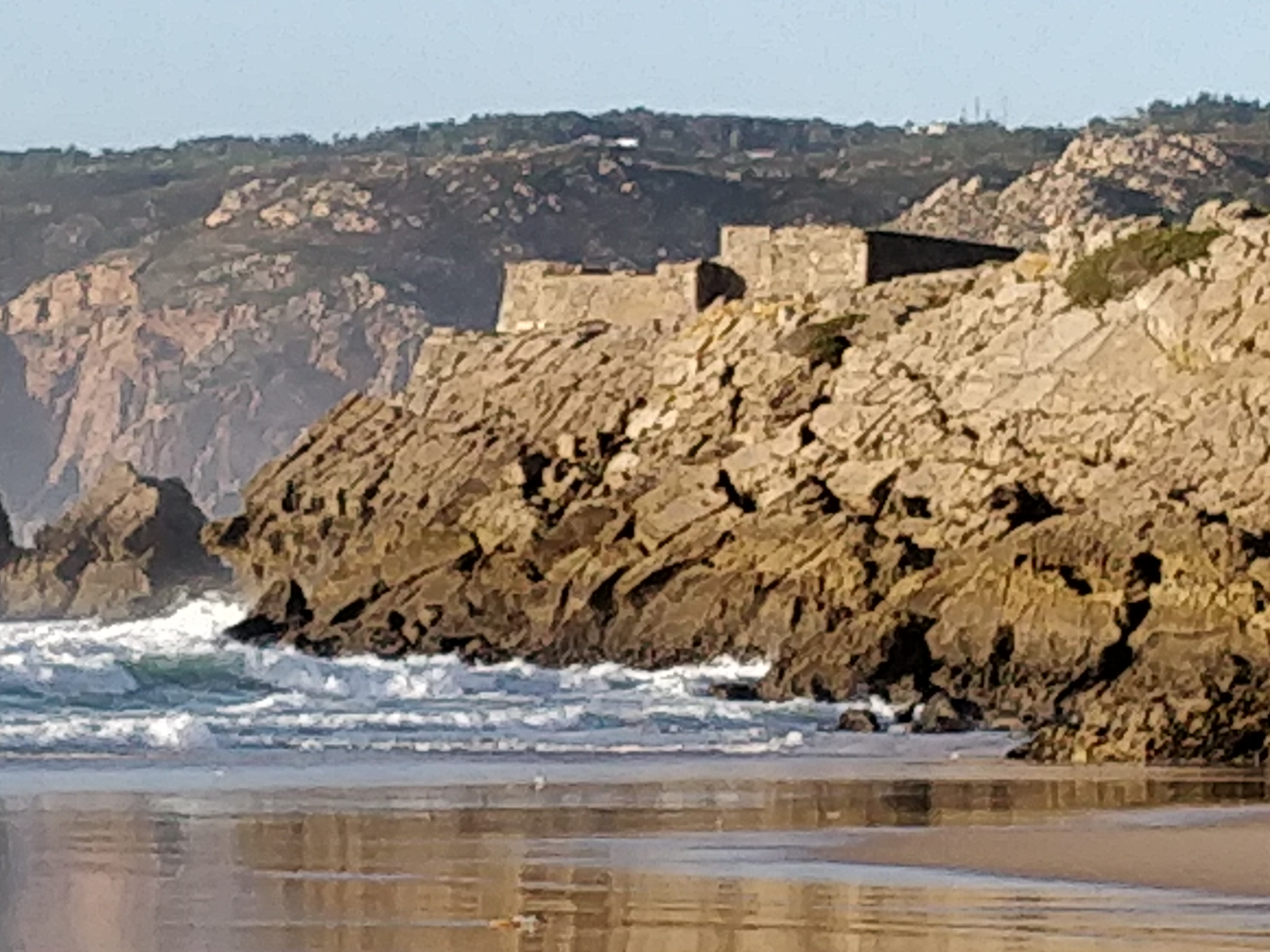
View of the Fort of Guincho from Guincho Beach

Following the threat of landslide within the area of the fort, the structure was reinforced in 1793. In addition the barracks were enlarged to include extra space for living quarters, a kitchen, a magazine and warehouse, resulting in the reconstruction of the main entrance and the enlargement of the cistern. The walls were made thicker and, to impede the destructiveness of the ocean waves, a small breakwater wall was constructed (along with a road to circulate between the two walls). The rotting wood and rusting ironwork were also replaced in the quarters and kitchens. By 1796, a new plan for the fort had been completed by Sergeant-major Maximiano José da Serra.

By the 19th century, four sentry boxes (of which only their bases remain) and seven cannon emplacements on the parapets of the battery were remodelled (with the addition of two new gun emplacements to the south and one to the north). At the time of the Peninsular War the post was manned by nine artillery men, a commander and eleven members of the infantry. But, between 1813 and 1814, there was no manned garrison on the site.

A military report concerning the inspection completed at the fort in 1829 determined that some of the arms could not be fired while others could not be repaired. In 1831-1832 work was carried out to repair the parapets, bartizans and cannon emplacements, to patch the walls, to apply bitumen to the cistern, and to tile and repair the powder magazine. Despite this work, during the next decade the fort continued to be abandoned. An inspection of the site, on the 26 March 1854, by Brigadier José Gerardo Ferreira Passos and Captain João António Esteves Vaz, referred to the advanced state of its ruin.

By the end of the 19th century, the Count of Moser had obtained the right to rent the property, and others rented it subsequently. By the 20th century, the Fort had been taken over by the Ministry of Economy (Portuguese: Ministério da Fazenda) on 3 November 1934, while still being rented by other people. In 1944 the fort began operating as a shelter, in the hands of the Clube Nacional de Campismo (National Club for Camping). Small renovations and adaptions were made for this purpose.

Between 1970 and 1975 the fort was unoccupied, although there were plans to install a post for customs officers. The Direcção-Geral da Fazenda Pública (Directorate-General for Public Finances) ceded the fort once again, to the Clube Nacional de Campismo. But its tenure was short-lived, being handing back by the Club on 25 August 1976. At the beginning of 1977, the fort suffered several acts of vandalism, with items stolen from the site, resulting in its closing.

Between 2003 and 2004, the fort was ceded to the Municipal Government of Cascais, with the hope that the site would be restored and converted into a cafeteria and visitors centre for the Parque Natural Sintra-Cascais (Nature Park of Sintra-Cascais). But, as of 2023 it remains unoccupied.

== Architecture ==
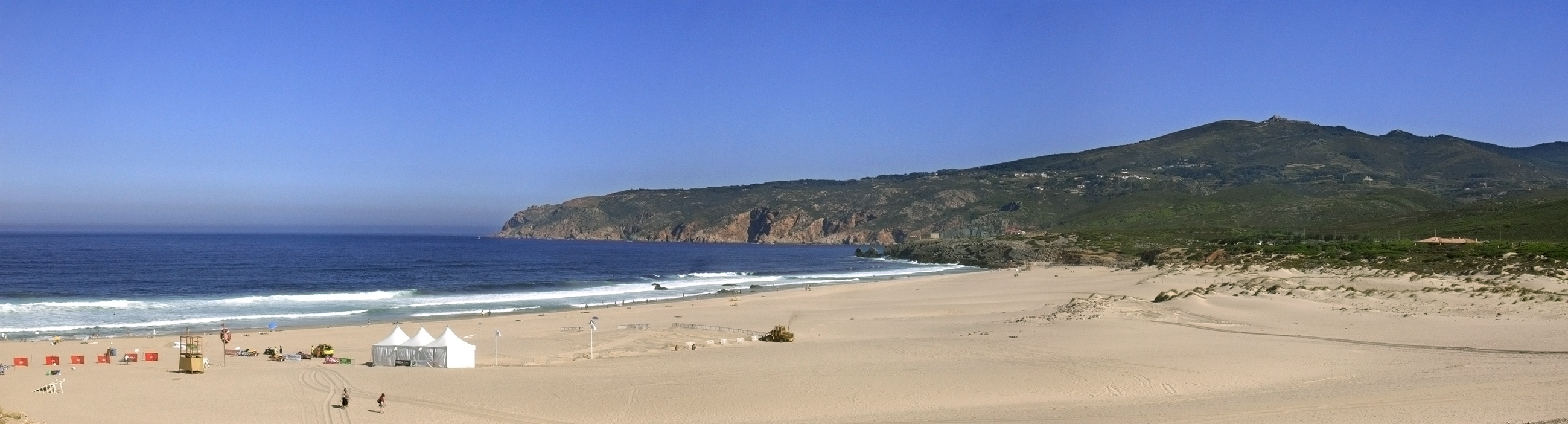
The white sand beach of Guincho, safeguarded by the Fort of Guincho (centre)

It is a rectangular plan design, with the main battery oriented towards the sea, while the smaller main building is oriented towards land. The battery emplacements had parapets of shallow height, that were expanded to include four cannons. The strong house is subdivided into three compartments, with vaulted ceiling, and a terrace for defence. In the centre of the structure is a cistern. The frontispiece is marked by a portico, with simple arch flanked on either side by geometric pieces of masonry, while surmounted by the coat-of-arms and crown of Portugal in stone. Initially the fort consisted of a rectangular plan, in which the side facing the land included three rectangular, vaulted divisions. An intermediary plan with enclosure, from which was organized the communication of the fort, quarters and by staircase the cannon emplacements. The latter, of reasonable dimensions, occupied about half the surface of walls, and could accommodate seven pieces of artillery firing at will. Another staircase, developed on one wall of the battery, leads to a paved terrace and parapet, which served as a musket firing line.

The remodelling that occurred at the 18th century, altered the interior plan of the fort. Public works expanded the central compartment, reorganized the main courtyard and enlarged the cistern. Similarly, these public works were responsible for the construction of a breakwater on the rocky outcrops to protect the foundations of the fort.
