= Cresmina Dune =

Dune system on the edge of the Sintra-Cascais Natural Park, Portugal

- Duna da Cresmina
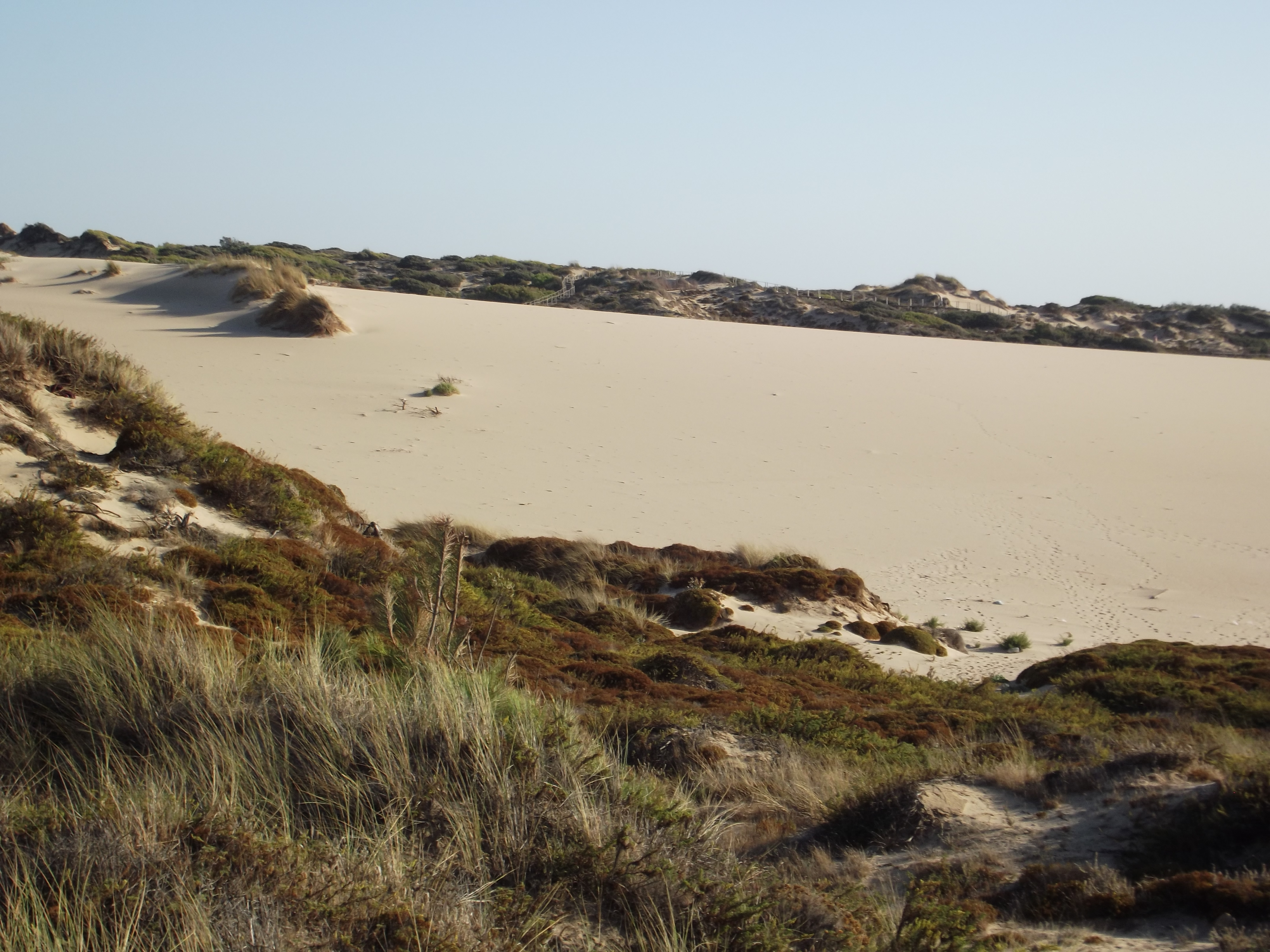
- Cresmina Dune from the north
- Interactive map of Cresmina Dune
- Location: Lisbon District, Portugal
- Nearest city: Cascais
- Coordinates: 34°43′N 9°28′W
- Area: 66 ha (160 acres)
- Established: 2011

The Cresmina Dune extends over 66 hectares and is a part of the Guincho-Oitavos dune system, located on the edge of the Sintra-Cascais Natural Park near Cascais in Portugal. This dune system is unusual in that, as a result of the prevailing northwest winds, the sand from the Guincho and Cresmina beaches eventually returns to the sea 5 km further to the south near Guia, after migrating over the flat, rocky and largely uninhabited area of Cabo Raso.

== Features ==
The Guincho-Cresmina dunes are an unstable system due to the constant drifting of sand particles caused by strong winds. The existence of barriers to movement, such as restaurants and hotels, which narrowed the sand transportation corridors between beaches and dunes, and the tendency of the wind speed to be increasing, led to increased deposits of sediments in areas further away from the coastline, with a consequent reduction in the beach area and potential damage to neighbouring land and homes. Studies show that the Cresmina dune is advancing in a north-south direction by about 10 m per year.

Fauna that find a home on the Cresmina Dune include Acanthodactylus erythrurus (Spiny-footed lizard), the White wagtail (Motacilla alba), the Sanderling (Calidris alba), the Common ringed plover (Charadrius hiaticula), and Vipera latastei (Lataste's Viper).

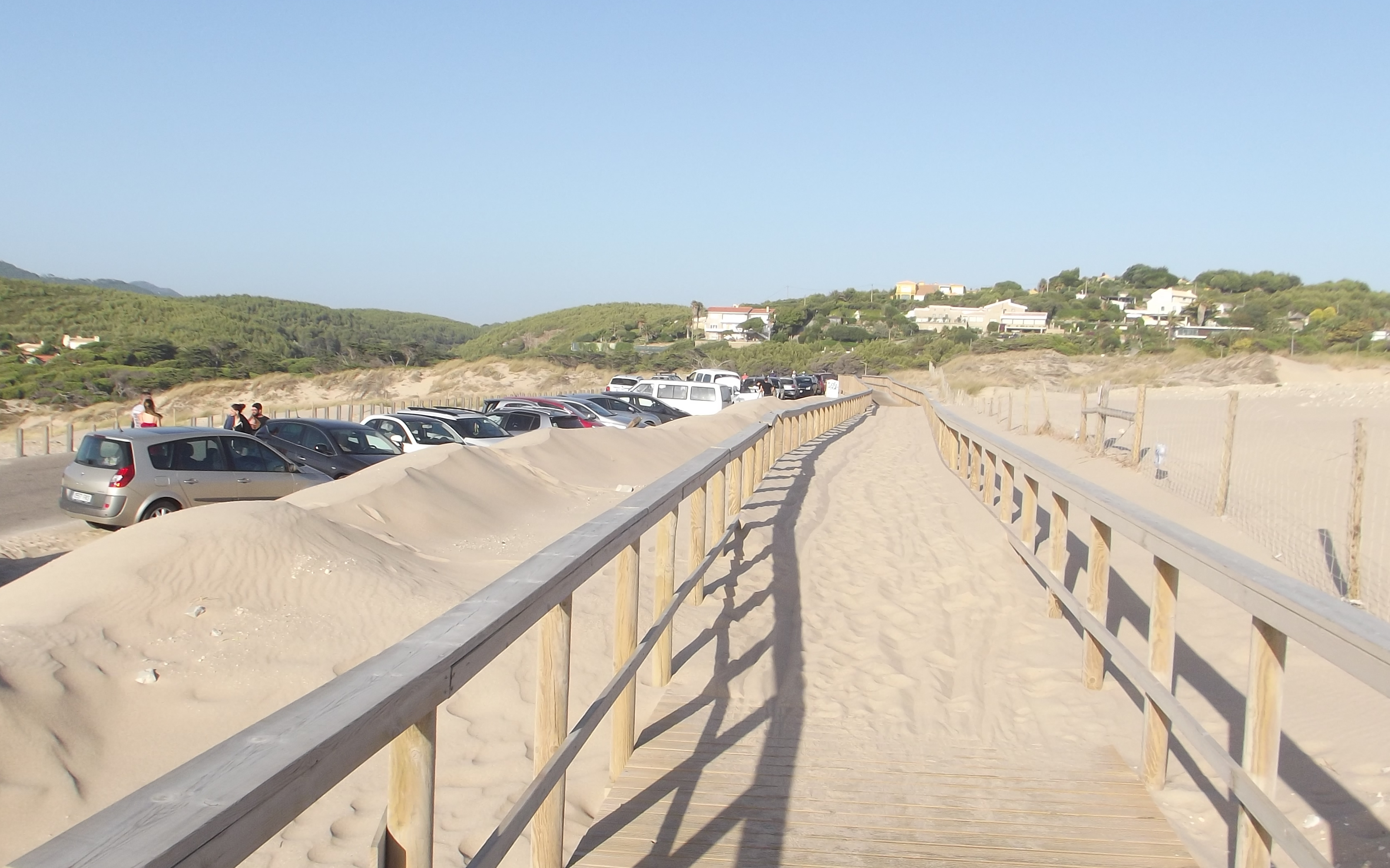
Sand heading from Guincho beach on the left to Cresmina Dune on the right

== Rehabilitation ==
Within the framework of the Sintra-Cascais Natural Park Visitation and Interpretation Network, the municipality of Cascais has been working since 2011 to rehabilitate dunes, in partnership with the Portuguese Institute for Nature Conservation and Forests. The work aims at providing maximum protection for the dunes by controlling pedestrian access and enabling local fauna and flora to recover from past damage caused by dogs, walkers, horse riders and cross-country vehicles. The dunes are now fully fenced. The work has also included the installation of natural regenerators, made using palisades of dead plant material. The placement of these structures is crucial to reduce the wind speed and thus contain the advance of the sand.

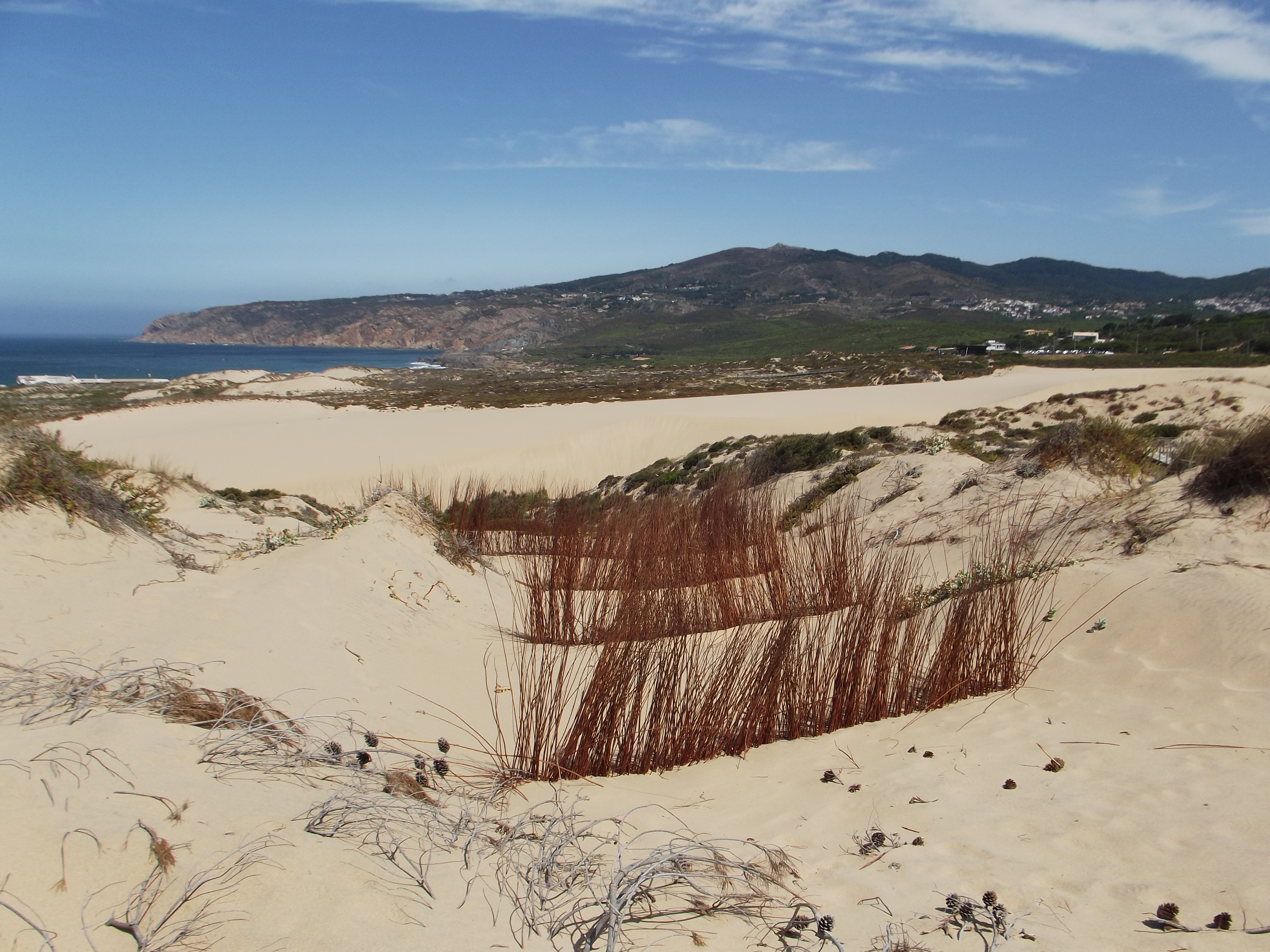
Palisades in Cresmina Dune

The Cresmina Dune Interpretation Centre provides informative panels on the walls of a refreshment bar. It aims to inform visitors of the unique fauna and flora associated with the Guincho-Cresmina dune system. Raised wooden walkways were installed to prevent people walking in the dunes. They are of close to 2 km in length and enable visitors to see native plants that are only found in the area, together with the fauna and flora that form a delicate ecological balance with the dunes. Some damage was caused to the northern part of the walkway as a result of a forest fire in the Sintra-Cascais Park that burned over 600 hectares on 6 October 2018 but it was speedily repaired.

Local vegetation recovery actions have also been implemented, namely through the removal of invasive species, such as the weeping Carpobrotus edulis, together with the planting of native species such as Ammophila arenaria (European Marram Grass), Armeria welwitschii (thrift), Juniperus turbinata (beach sabina), Pancratium maritimum, (sea daffodil) and Ononis ramosissima.

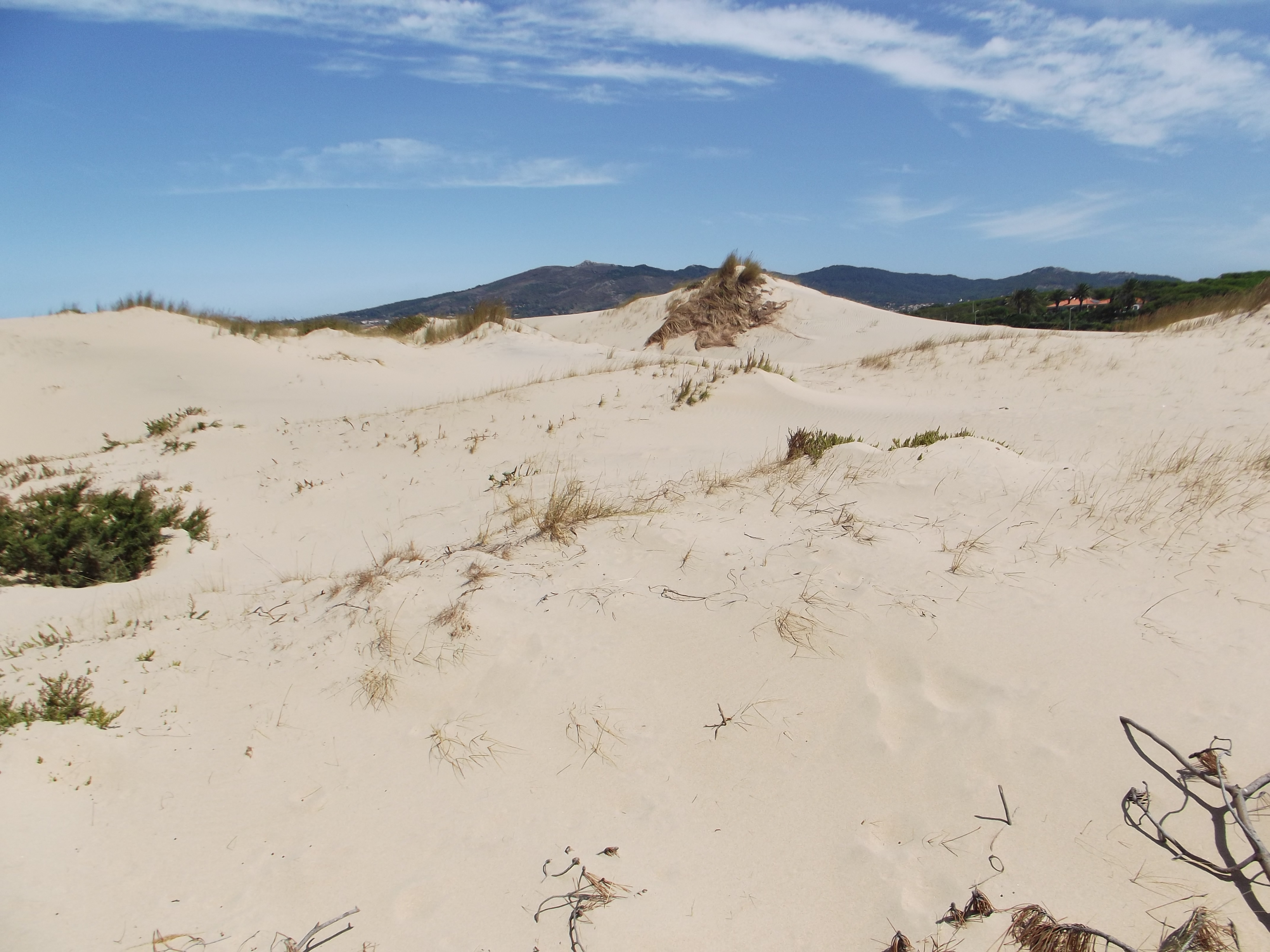
View from the south
