= Sintra-Cascais Natural Park =

Protected area near Lisbon, Portugal

- IUCN category V (protected landscape/seascape)
- Castle of the Moors in the Sintra Mountains.

- Location within Portugal
- Location: Lisbon District, Portugal
- Coordinates: 38°47′58″N 9°26′32″W
- Area: 144.51 km^{2} (55.80 sq mi)
- Max. elevation: 528 m (1,732 ft)
- Min. elevation: sea-level
- Established: October 15, 1981
- Visitors: 43,512 (in 2017-2020 (average))
- Governing body: ICNF

The Sintra-Cascais Natural Park is a park on the Portuguese Riviera, one of the 13 Natural Parks of Portugal. While only established in 1994 as a Natural Park by the Portuguese Government, it has been protected since 1981. With an area of approximately 145 km^{2}, the park includes the Serra de Sintra Mountain Range but extends all the way to the coast and Cabo da Roca, continental Europe's westernmost point. It contains the Castle of the Moors. Located 25 km from Lisbon, the Sintra-Cascais Natural Park is a popular tourism area, with many different individual historic and natural attractions. Sintra and Cascais are towns and municipalities on the Lisbon / Estoril Coast.

== Attractions within the Park ==
- Anta de Adrenunes
- Azenhas do Mar
- Biester Palace
- Cabo da Roca
- Castle of the Moors
- Chalet and Garden of the Countess of Edla
- Convent of the Capuchos (Sintra) (Convent of the Friars Minor Capuchin)
- Cresmina Dune
- Palace of Sintra
- Pena Palace
- Praia do Guincho (Guincho Beach)
- Monserrate Palace
- Quinta da Regaleira
- Quinta da Ribafria
- Ramalhão Palace
- Sanctuary of Peninha
- Seteais Palace

== Photo Gallery ==
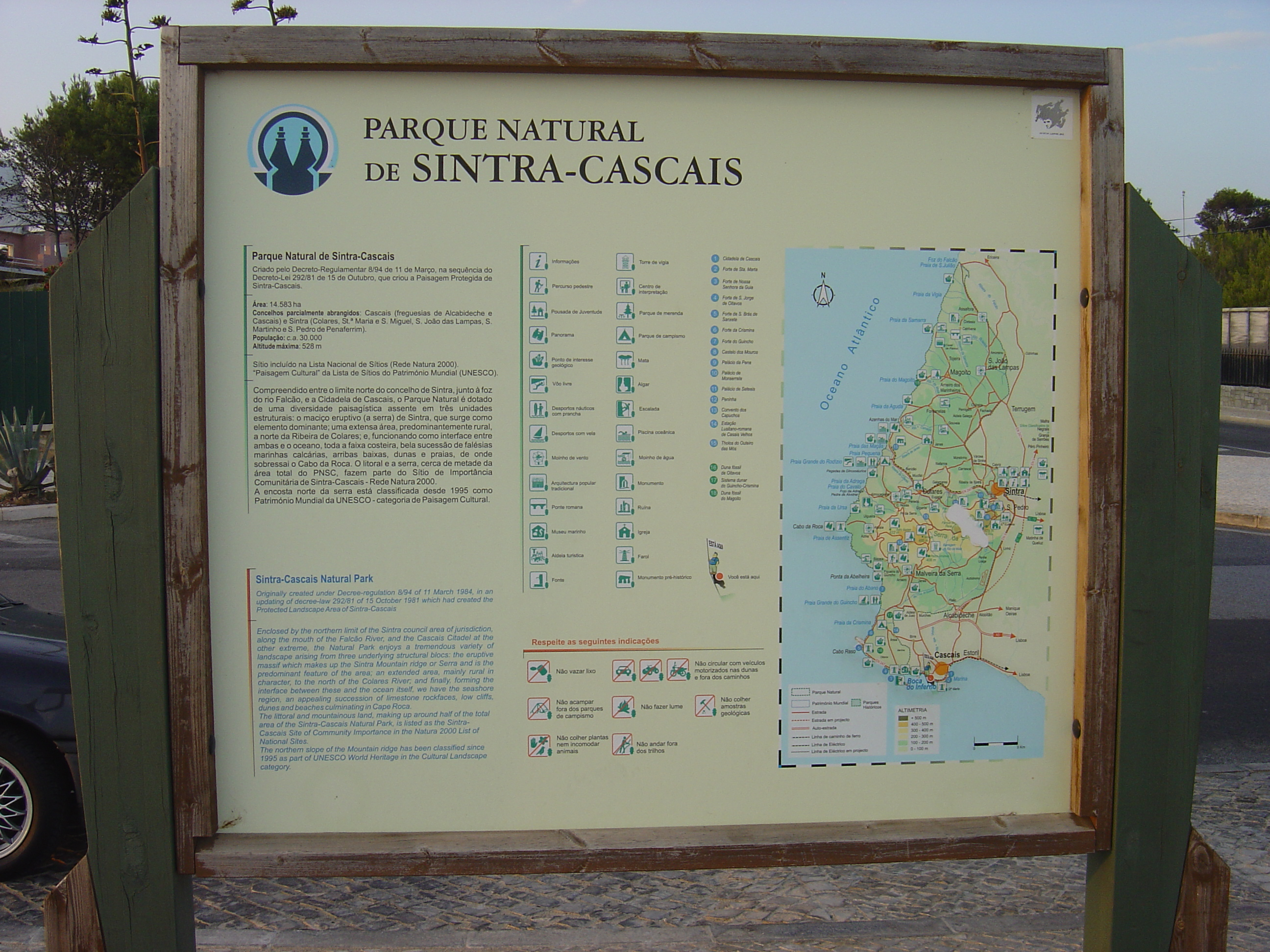
A sign after entering the park, near Cascais.

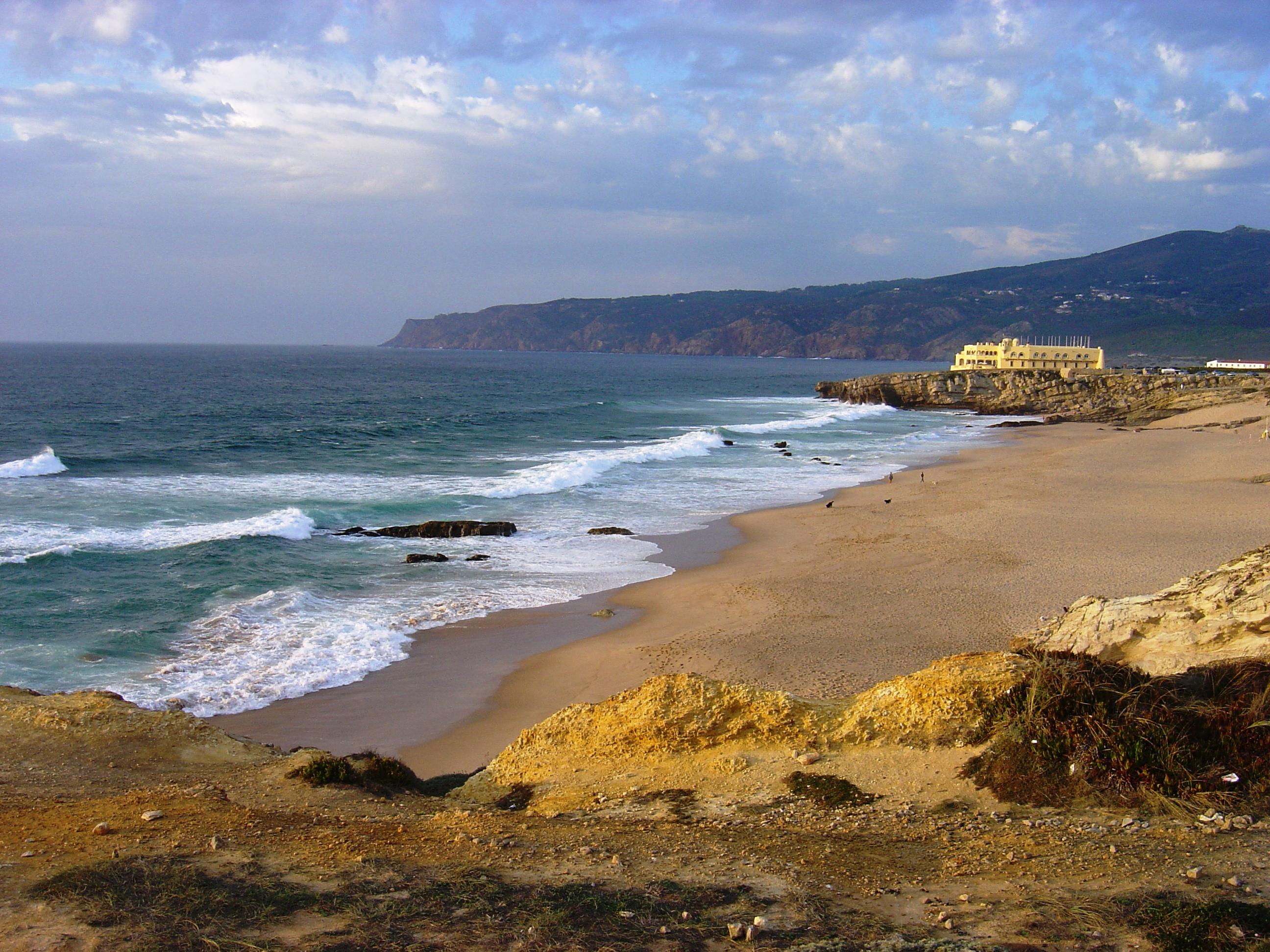
Guincho, a well known beach near Cascais, with Cabo da Roca seen at distance.

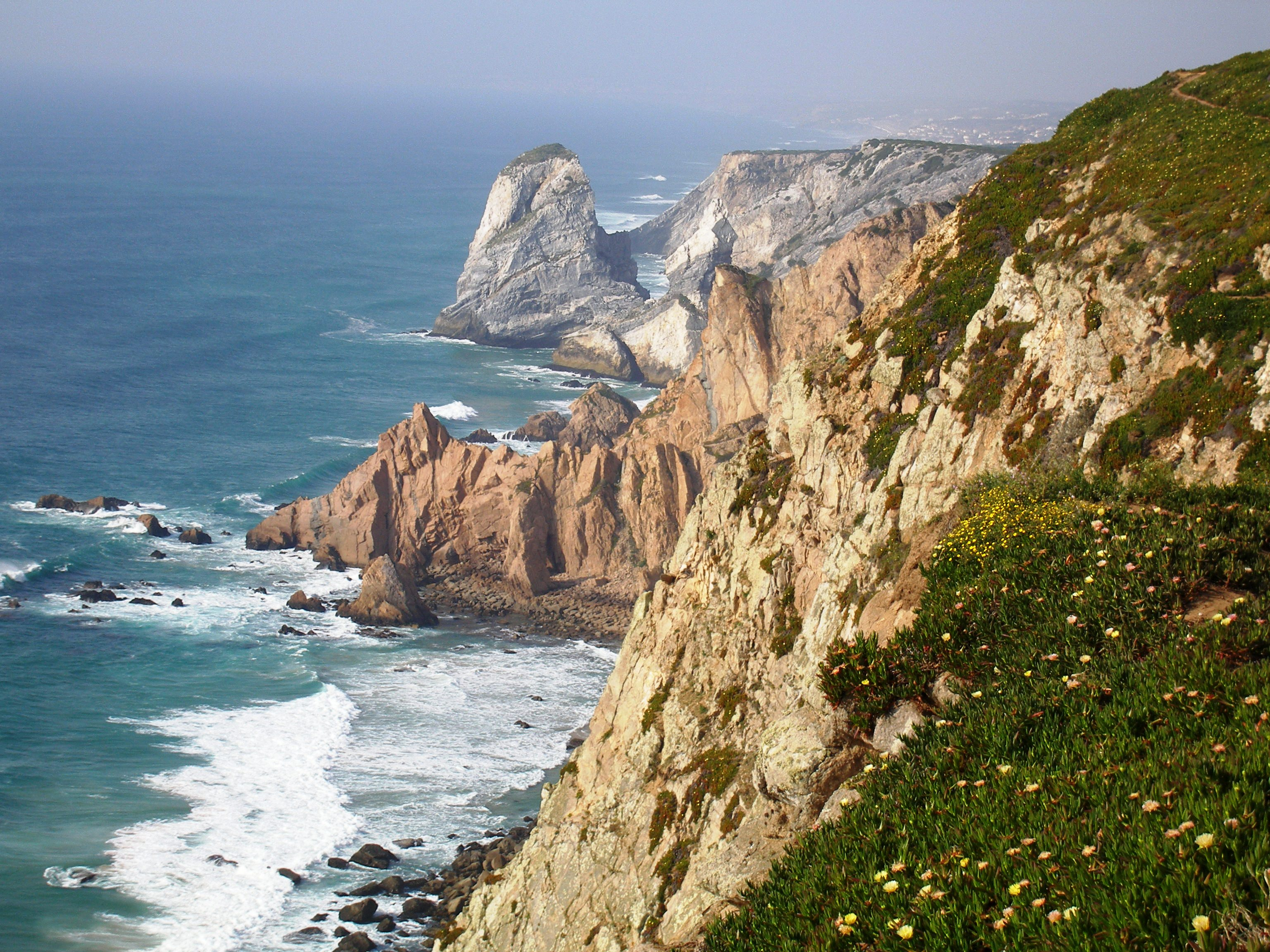
Cabo da Roca, near Sintra.

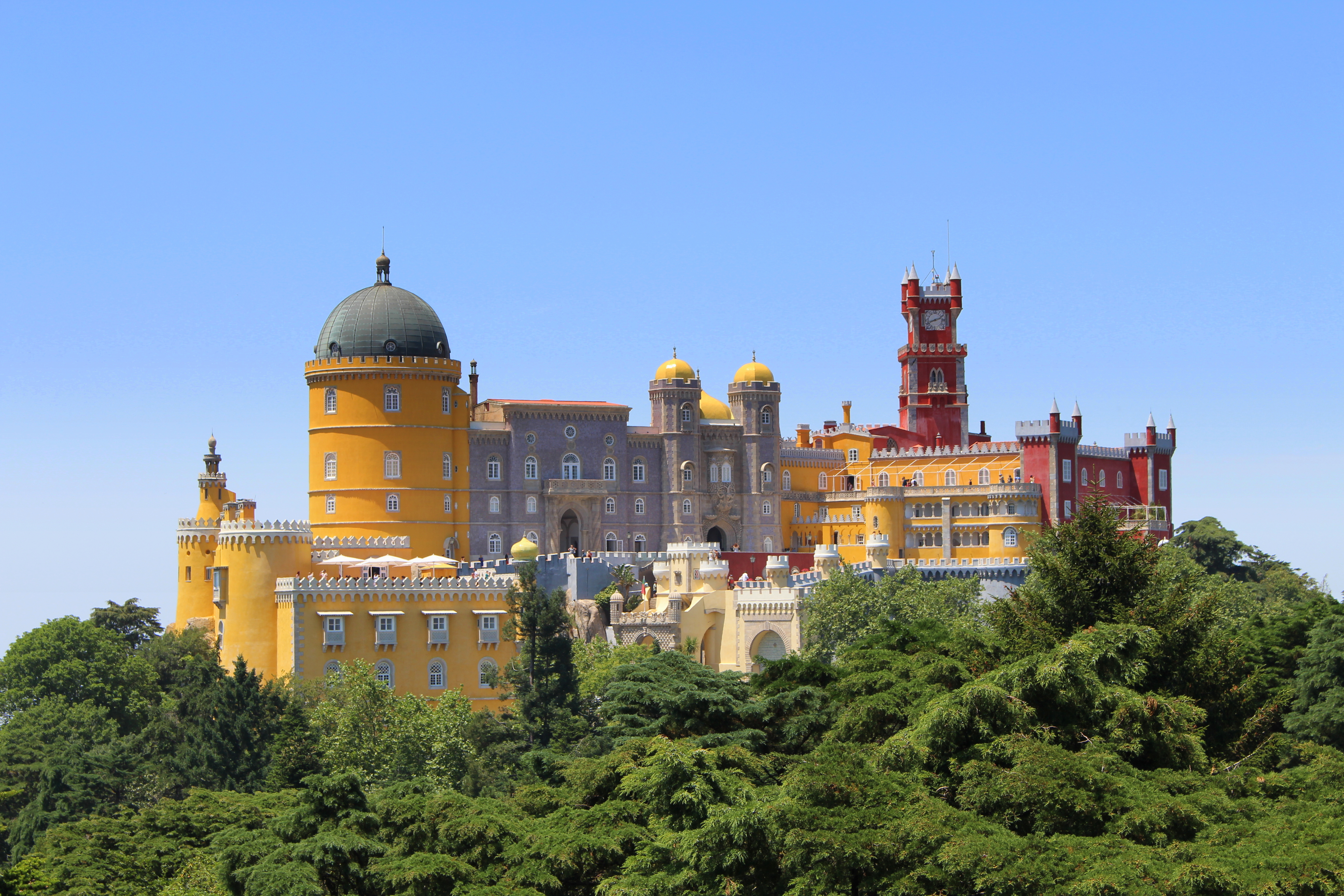
The Pena Palace, standing on a hill above Sintra.
