= Quinta da Ribafria, Sintra =

16th-century country estate in Portugal

Quinta da Ribafria
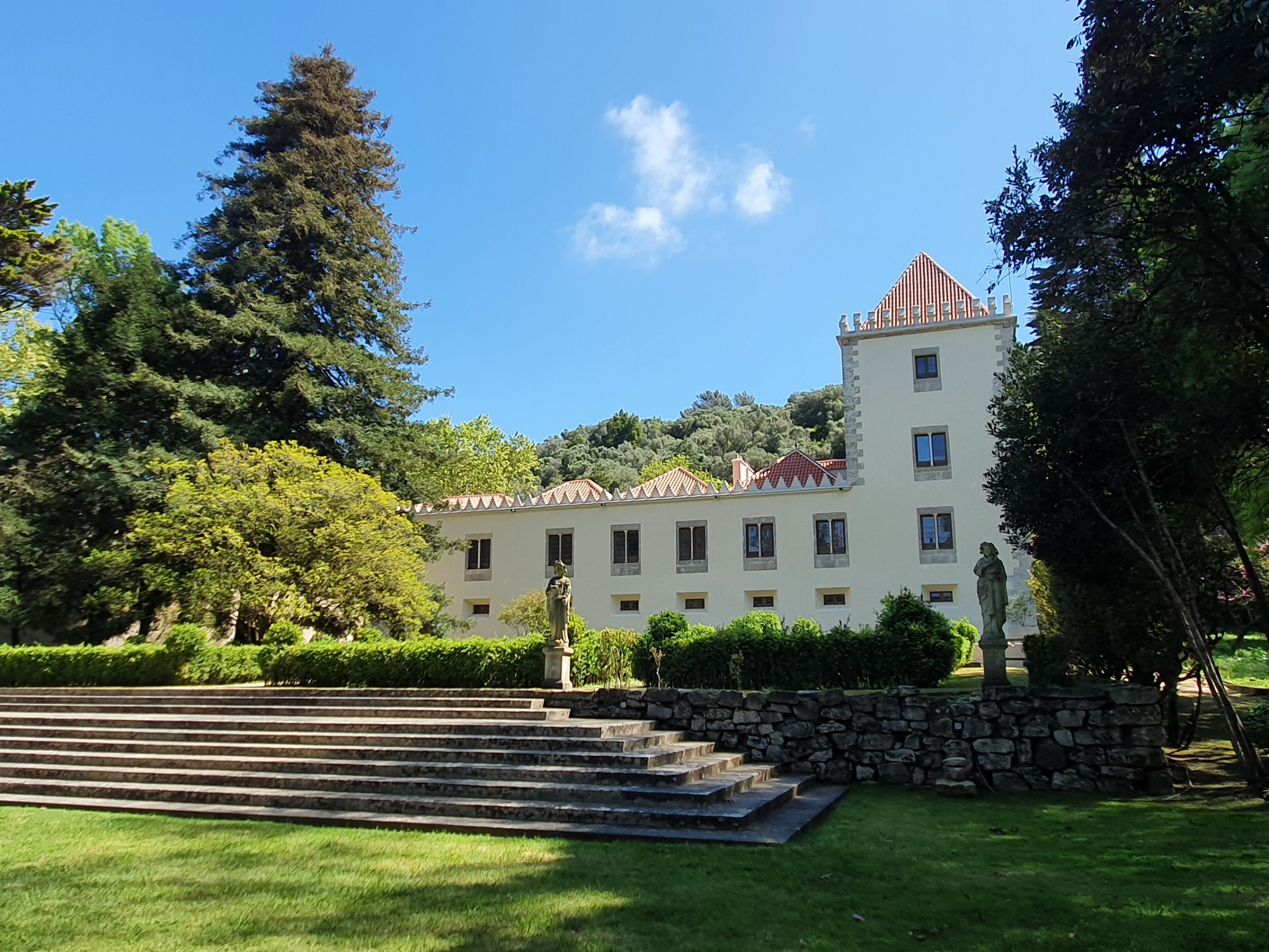
- The palace, as seen from the front
- Interactive map of the Quinta da Ribafria area

General information
- Architectural style: Renaissance, Manueline
- Location: Sintra, Portugal
- Coordinates: 38.817117°N 9.372664°W
- Construction started: 1536
- Completed: 1541
- Owner: Sintra Municipality

UNESCO World Heritage Site
- Part of: Cultural Landscape of Sintra
- Criteria: Cultural: (ii), (iv), (v)
- Reference: 723
- Inscription: 1995 (19th Session)

Portuguese National Monument
- Type: Non-movable
- Criteria: Monument of Public Interest
- Designated: 18 August 1943
- Reference no.: IPA.00006107

The Quinta da Ribafria (Ribafria Estate) is situated close to Sintra in Lisbon District, Portugal. It was built from 1536 to 1541 by Gaspar Gonçalves, a ceremonial official of the Portuguese Royal Household (the "Porteiro-mor" who was responsible for opening the door for visitors to enter the room where the king was), on land donated to him by King Manuel I in 1515. The property is now owned by the Sintra Municipality.

== History ==
The land donated by King Manuel I was at the time known as the Herdade das Laranjeiras (Orange Tree Estate), and it still contains many orange trees. Gaspar Gonçalves ordered the construction of a small Renaissance palace, which also contains elements of the Manueline style prevalent in Portugal at that time. On its completion, King John III appointed Gonçalves as Lord of Ribafria and awarded him an official coat of arms. The building incorporates a 17th-century tower inspired by medieval Portuguese buildings, which is covered by a cornice with merlon battlements. The western side has the coat of arms in the stonework. The rest of the building is made up of two parts, but the façade is symmetrical and contains Mudéjar battlements inspired by the Mosque of Cordoba in Spain and also used in the Church of Nossa Senhora da Anunciação in Mértola, Portugal, which is a converted mosque. The interior has wooden coffered ceilings, which are painted with hunting scenes, as well as floral and marine motifs. There are chapels in the house as well as a small one a short walk away in the woods of the garden. The building is considered a good example of the Portuguese manor house of the time.

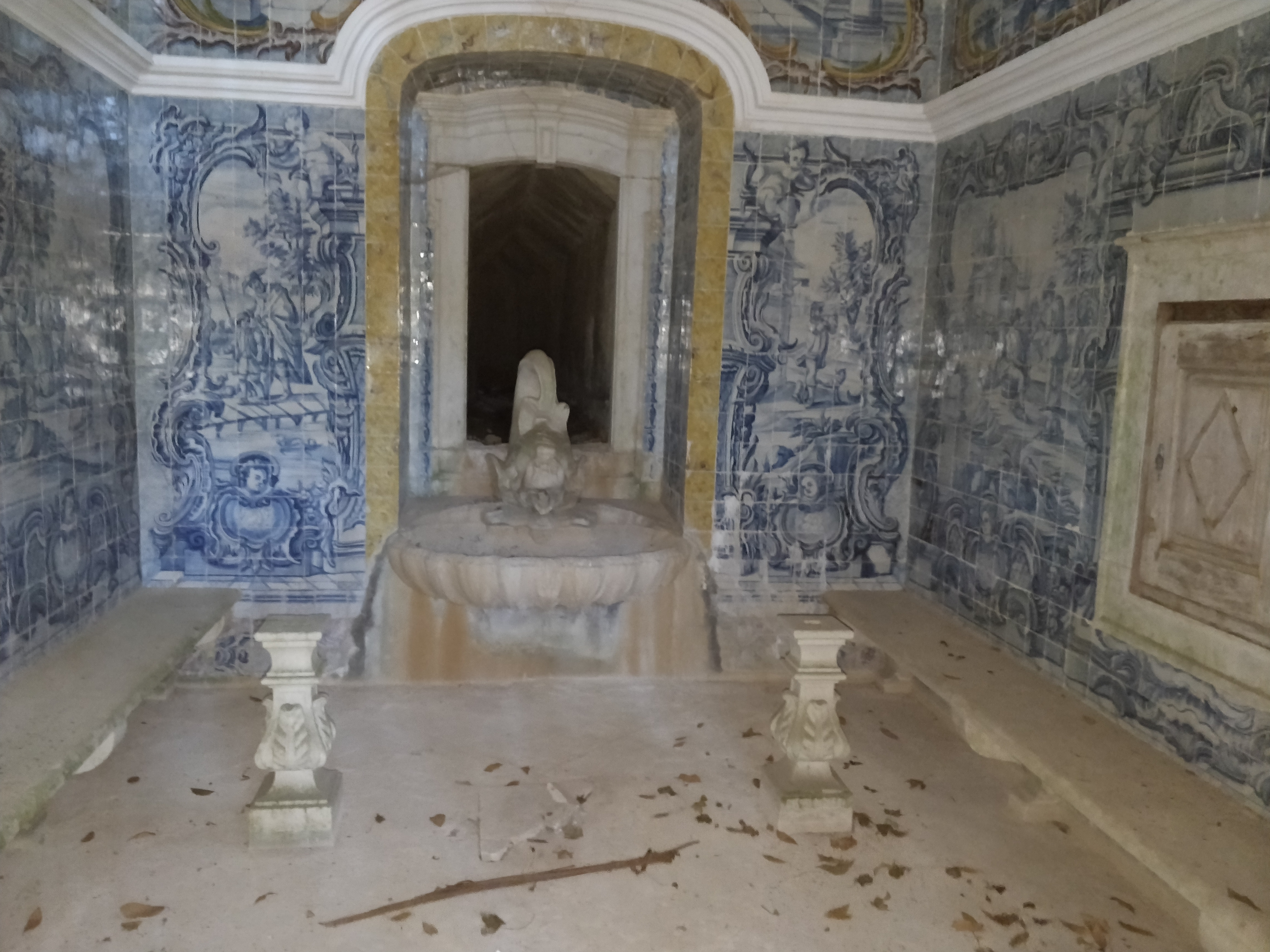
The Garden Chapel

Some damage was experienced to the buildings as a result of the earthquake in 1755. In 1902 the property was sold to the Count of Cartaxo. His grandson undertook restoration work in the 1960s. From 1987 to 2002 Quinta da Ribafria was home to the Friedrich Naumann Foundation. During this time work was undertaken to improve the garden and add office space in the garden, with the work being supervised by two well-known Portuguese architects, Francisco Caldeira Cabral and Gonçalo Ribeiro Telles. The estate was acquired by Sintra Municipality in 2003. After several years of neglect it was taken over by the Cultursintra Foundation (Fundação Cultursintra) and is now used for the display of sculptures and for open-air performances in the summer. The gardens can be visited daily but the house is closed to visitors without a special request.
