= Anta de Adrenunes =

Megalithic site near Sintra, Portugal

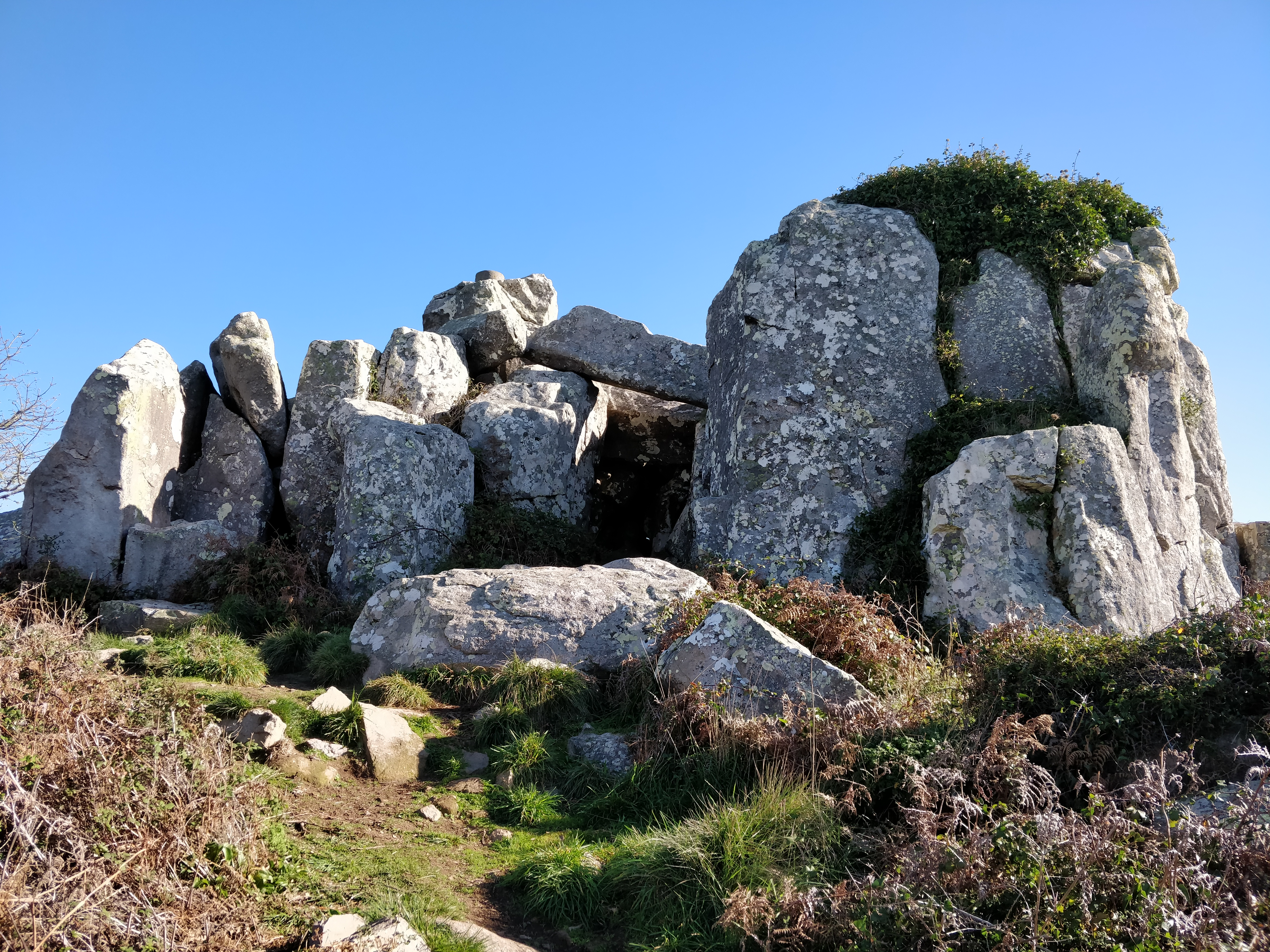
- Interactive map of Anta de Adrenunes
- 38°46′41″N 9°27′52″W
- Type: Megalithic
- Location: Colares, Lisbon District, Portugal

Site notes
- Elevation: 426 m (1,398 ft)
- Archaeologists: Joaquim Possidónio Narciso da Silva
- Public access: Yes. Via footpath.

The Anta de Adrenunes, located on top of a hill at 426 metres above sea level, in the municipality of Sintra, within Sintra-Cascais Natural Park, Lisbon District, Portugal, is believed to be a Stone Age burial chamber or megalithic monument. It is a structure consisting of a cluster of granite stones, between which there is a gallery about 5 metres high that is surmounted by monoliths that rest horizontally on vertical stones. The passage is thought to have served as a collective necropolis or dolmen during the megalithic period although no artifacts or burial chambers have been found to prove this. The site contains a geodesic landmark that has been inserted into one of the upper stones.

Initial excavations by Joaquim Possidónio Narciso da Silva (1806-1896) found no evidence of funerary use. However, Da Silva presented the results of his research at one of the sessions of the International Congress of Anthropology and Prehistoric Archaeology in 1871, referring to the site as a megalithic funerary monument. Later writers have argued that the site combines natural granite rocks, which are also found elsewhere in the area, with some architectural elements. They point to the layout of the rocks and their orientation to the sunset to argue that this suggests a megalithic structure that was probably of natural origin and was later worked on by humans. More recent excavations of the stones have provided some evidence of the intervention of humans, as granite wedges in the foundations of some of the stones have been identified. The approximately rectangular shape of some of the rocks also provides possible evidence of human intervention, although other writers have argued that the site is no more than a natural collection of rocks.

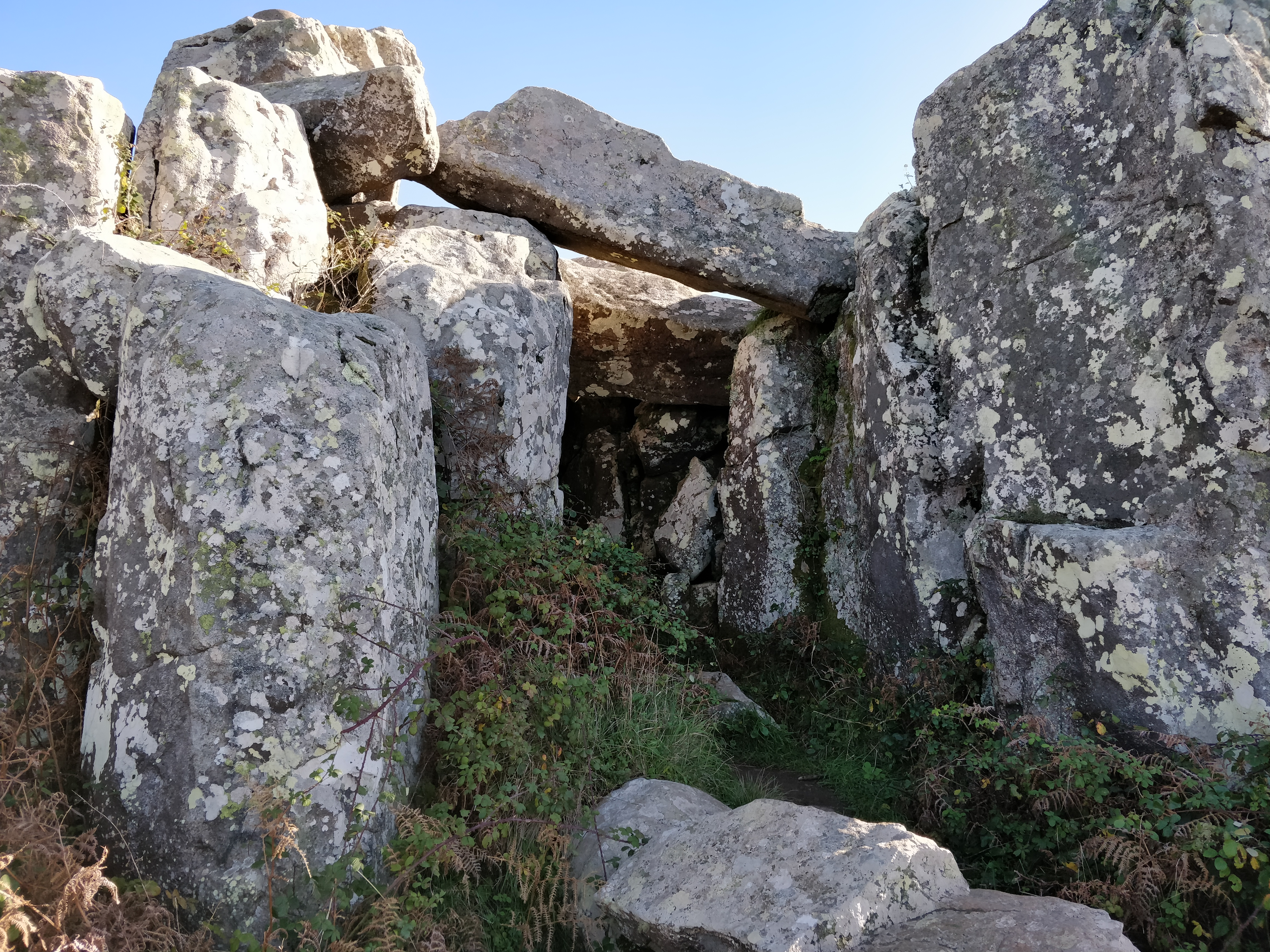
View of the passage believed to have served as a necropolis

Visiting the site requires a walk of about one kilometre from a tarred road. It receives relatively few visitors, although it is popular at the solstices and equinoxes.

== Origin of its name ==
It is possible that the name of this Anta, like that of the cliff in which it is located, may have resulted from the corruption of the name of an old owner of the place.
