= Cabo Raso Lighthouse =

Lighthouse in Portugal

Cabo Raso Lighthouse Farol do Cabo Raso
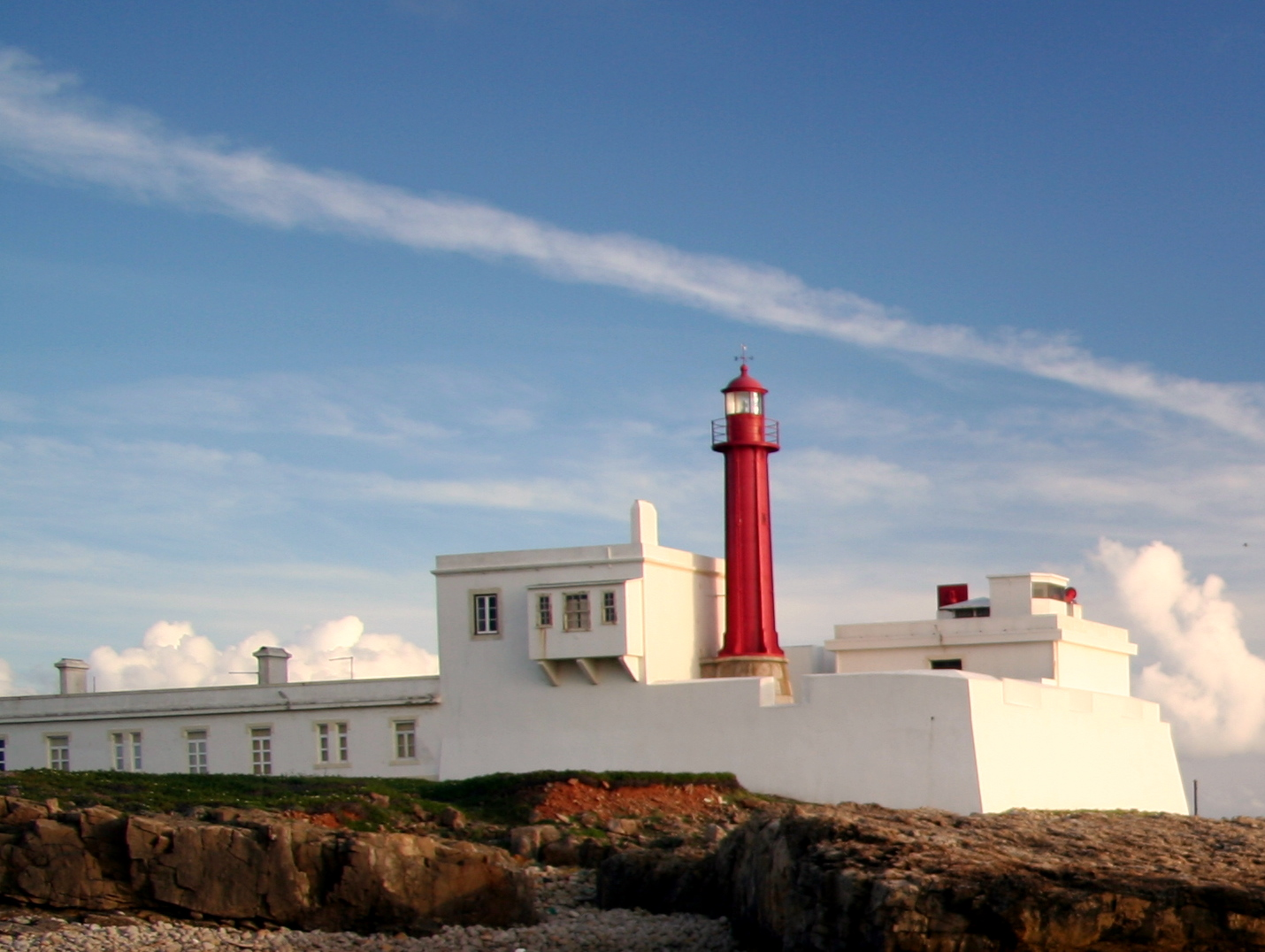
- Location: Cascais, Portugal
- Coordinates: 38°42′34.00″N 9°29′09.00″W

Tower
- Constructed: 1894
- Construction: cast iron
- Automated: 1984
- Height: 13 metres (43 ft)
- Heritage: heritage without legal protection

Light
- Focal height: 23 m (75 ft)
- Lens: Fifth-order Fresnel
- Range: 20 nautical miles
- Characteristic: Fl(3) W 15s

Cabo Raso Lighthouse is an active Portuguese lighthouse that is located in the Fort of São Brás of Sanxete, near Cascais, Lisbon District. It is a cylindrical, red, metallic tower, thirteen meters high, with a lantern and balcony and attached buildings.

== History ==
The small maritime fort of São Brás of Sanxete was originally erected, together with the nearby fort of Cresmina, to protect the Guincho Beach, a vast sandy area where enemy ships could easily disembark troops. In 1894 the fort ceased to serve a defensive function and a lighthouse beacon was installed on the site.

In 1884, the Portuguese Commission on Lighthouses and Beacons decided on the need for construction of a lighthouse at Cabo Raso. The original plan was modified in 1893, because it was going to prove too expensive. The cheaper solution involved building a house for the lighthouse keeper, with 4 rooms. The light was installed on a slab positioned in front of one of the windows of the house, and, after its use, was moved into the interior of the room on a wooden carriage that rested on rails. This lighthouse went into operation on January 1, 1894, with a fixed oil light. In 1914, a sound signal was added, created by a tube of compressed air. The following year, the light of the lighthouse was finally transferred to the current iron tower, which is painted red and has a range of twenty nautical miles.

This lighthouse was electrified in 1947, connected to the public power grid in 1969 and automated in 1984. In December 2003 the previous light system was replaced and an ML-300 flashlight with TF 3B flasher and 50W12V lamps was installed.

== See also ==
- List of lighthouses in Portugal
- Directorate of Lighthouses, Portugal
