= Institute for Nature Conservation and Forests =

- Instituto da Conservação da Natureza e das Florestas

Agency overview
- Formed: 2012
- Preceding agencies: Autoridade Florestal Nacional (AFN) and Fundo Florestal Permanente (FFP); Instituto da Conservação da Natureza e Biodiversidade (ICNB)
- Jurisdiction: Government of Portugal
- Headquarters: Lisbon; 38.7358304°N 9.1471787°W
- Agency executive: Rogério Rodrigues, President of the Board of Directors
- Parent agency: Ministry of Agriculture, Forests and Rural Development and Ministry for Environment
- Website: http://www2.icnf.pt/portal/

The Institute for Nature Conservation and Forests (Portuguese: Instituto da Conservação da Natureza e das Florestas, I.P.), ICNF, is the responsible governmental body for the nature and forest policies, including the management of Protected Areas and State managed national, municipal and communal forests of mainland Portugal.

== History ==
The ICNF was formed in 2012 by the merging of the Autoridade Florestal Nacional (and the Fundo Florestal Permanente) with the Instituto da Conservação da Natureza e Biodiversidade (Institute for Nature Conservation and Biodiversity), under Decree-Law 135/2012 (29 June 2012).

== Organization ==
The Institute for Nature Conservation and Forestry is a public institute, indirectly administrated by the Portuguese State, endowed with administrative and financial autonomy and its own assets.

The ICNF's mission is to propose, monitor and ensure the implementation of policies in the fields of nature conservancy and forests, to promote the conservation, sustainable use, appreciation, and enjoyment of the natural heritage. It is also in charge of the promotion and sustainable development of forest resources, to allow increased competitiveness along the forestry-to-industry chain, but also to defend hunting resources and fishing and aquaculture on inland waters.
