= Praia do Guincho =

Beach in Portugal

Coordinates: 38.733149°N 9.472696°W

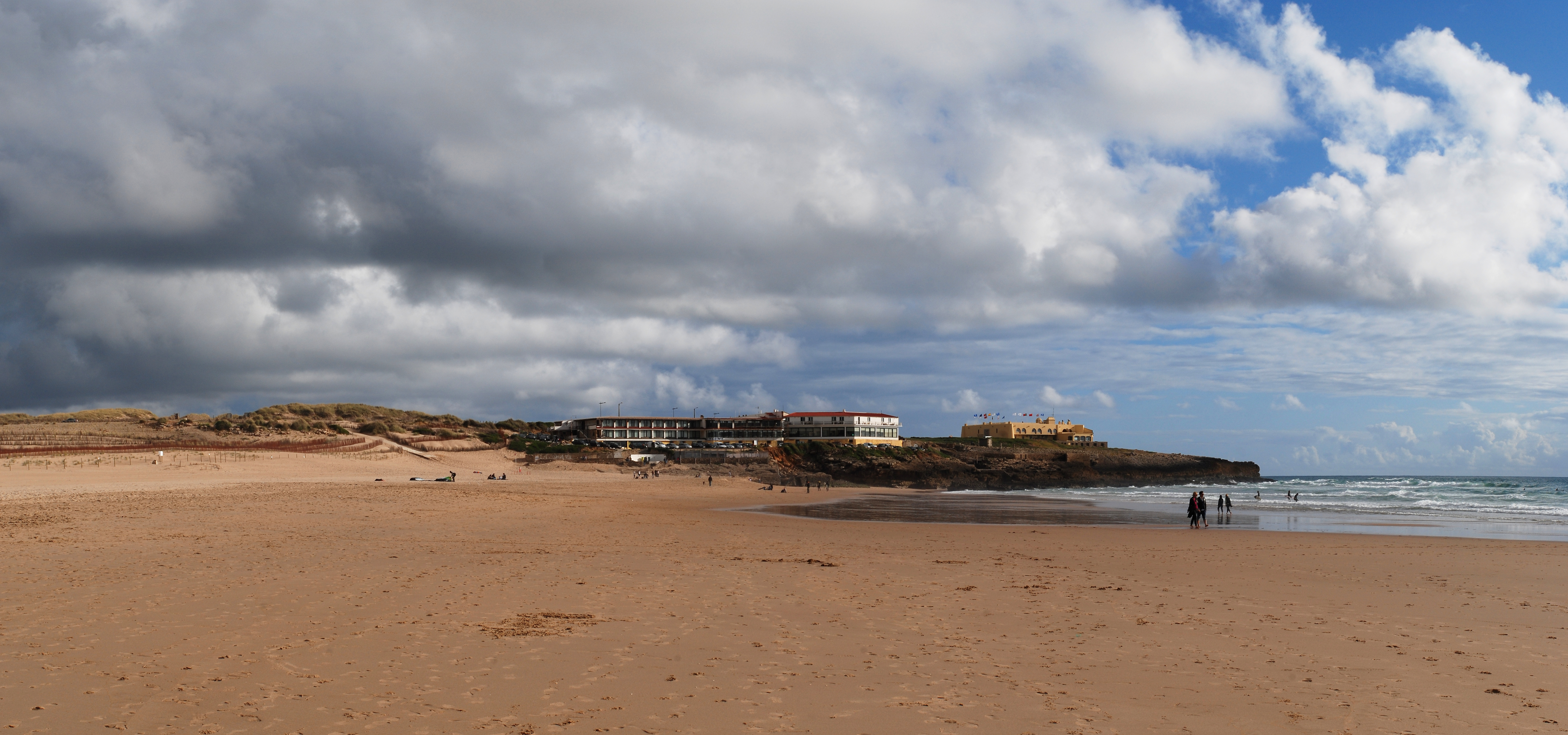
The Guincho beach viewed from north, with the Fortess of Guincho in the back

Praia do Guincho (English: Guincho Beach) is an Atlantic beach located on Portugal's Estoril coast, 5 km from the town of Cascais, and is located in the municipality of Cascais, more precisely in the parishes of Cascais e Estoril and Alcabideche, in the District of Lisbon. Guincho is situated close to several small villages, including Areia, Charneca, Figueira do Guincho and Biscaia.

The beach, which has a shoreline of approximately 800 metres, has preferred surfing conditions and is popular for surfing, windsurfing, and kitesurfing. Strong northern winds are predominant during summer time (June–August) as well as smaller north-west swells, making this beach ideal for windsurfing and kitesurfing. During winter (especially December), the predominant winds are from the east, and swells increase in size, making it a perfect spot for surfing, with multiple beach-breaks providing powerful lefts and rights. There are also several surfcamps and surfschools in the area that provide accommodation and services including rentals, repairs and surfing classes. However, Guincho is situated on the western edge of the Sintra-Cascais Natural Park and this designation has protected the beach from excessive tourism development, as has the fact that the waves and wind mean it is not suitable as a beach for swimming and sunbathing, particularly for people with young children.

This beach was featured in the pre-titles sequence of the James Bond film On Her Majesty's Secret Service, wherein James Bond rescues Contessa Teresa di Vicenzo from a suicide attempt and foils off two attackers in the surf; the beach still looks as it did in 1969. More recently, the beach served as location for the shooting of the film This Side of Resurrection, directed by Joaquim Sapinho.

In the '90s, Guincho was one of the locations for the windsurfing world cup. Today, several sporting events are held at Guincho regularly, including the Portuguese National Surfing and BodyBoarding Championships.

== Access ==
The beach is easy to access with local bus number 15 (from Cascais) serving the beach. The closest parking requires payment in Summer. There are 500 spaces located on the north end of the beach and has a path leading straight onto the beach and the local beach bar. Free parking options are also available on the southern end of the beach, but require two to five minutes of walking. Some paid parkings are disabled and become free during winter season. During tourist season, cars frequently park along the main road.

== Surfing ==
Praia do Guincho is one of the most well-known surf beaches in the Lisbon region. The beach features multiple sand-bottom beach breaks that produce both left- and right-breaking waves.

Wave conditions vary significantly by season. During winter months, particularly from November to February, Atlantic swells from the west and northwest regularly produce waves in the 1.5 to 3 metres (4.9 to 9.8 ft) range, with larger swells occasionally exceeding 4 metres (13 ft)..

The beach has hosted numerous competitive surfing events, including stages of the Portuguese National Surfing and Bodyboarding Championships organised by the Federação Portuguesa de Surf. In the 1990s, Guincho served as a venue for the Professional Windsurfers Association World Cup tour, drawing international competitors and helping establish the beach's reputation in the global wave sports community.

Several surf schools and camps operate in the Guincho area, offering lessons, board rentals, and accommodation packages to visitors of varying skill levels. Due to strong currents, powerful shore break, and rapidly changing wind conditions, local authorities and surf instructors generally advise inexperienced swimmers to exercise caution.

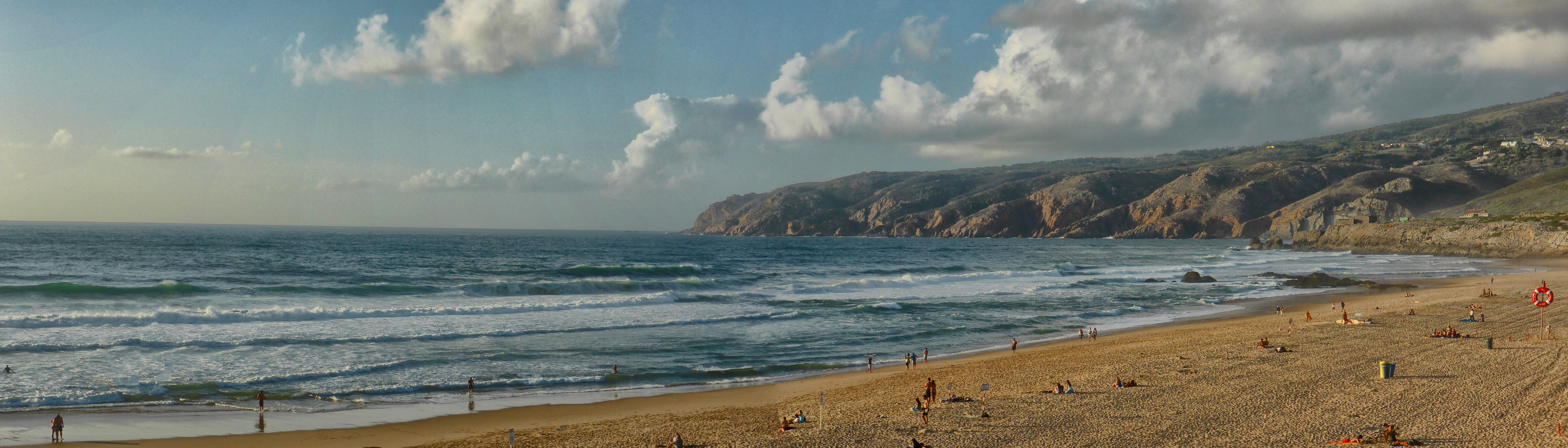
Praia do Guincho, west coast of Portugal

== See also ==
- Cresmina Dune
