= List of Portuguese films of 2006 =

A list of Portuguese films that were first released in 2006.

Release date	Title	Director	Cast	Genre	Notes	Ref
January 26	Melted in Tears	Rosa Coutinho Cabral			1.328 admissions	
March 2	Blood Curse	Tiago Guedes, Frederico Serra			29.239 admissions	
March 9	Magic Mirror	Manoel de Oliveira			2.656 admissions	
March 30	Vanitas	Paulo Rocha			493 admissions	
April 20	Lisboetas	Sérgio Tréfaut			15.246 admissions	
May 4	Movimentos Perpétuos: Cine-Tributo a Carlos Paredes	Edgar Pêra			1.028 admissions	
July 13	Bosnia Diaries	Joaquim Sapinho			1.728 admissions	
September 7	Animal	Roselyne Bosch			7.632 admissions	
September 7	Diário de Um Mundo Novo	Paulo Nascimento			1.583 admissions	
September 14	98 Octane	Fernando Lopes			6.246 admissions	
October 5	Transe	Teresa Villaverde			5.020 admissions	
October 12	Trickters	José Sacramento			278.421 admissions	
November 9	Mists	Ricardo Costa			24 admissions	
November 16	A Rich Widow Is Not Long Single	José Fonseca e Costa			12.353 admissions	
November 23	Colossal Youth	Pedro Costa			1.943 admissions; Entered into the 2006 Cannes Film Festival	
December 21	20,13	Joaquim Leitão			6.594 admissions	

== See also ==
- 2006 in Portugal
