= Joaquim Sapinho =

Portuguese film director (born 1965)

- Born: 1965 (age 60–61); Sabugal, Portugal
- Occupations: Film director, writer and producer
- Known for: Director of Bosnia Diaries
- Website: http://www.rosafilmes.pt

Joaquim Sapinho (born 1965 at Sabugal, Portugal) is a Portuguese film director. Founder of production company Rosa Filmes, he is considered to be part of The School of Reis film family.

== Career ==
Joaquim Sapinho was a student at the Portuguese National Film School (Escola Superior de Teatro e Cinema), where he was a student of António Reis, Paulo Rocha and Alberto Seixas Santos, and where he is nowadays a professor of directing for cinema.

He started as a documentarist for television, before directing his first feature. In 1995, with his first picture, Haircut, he gave us a rare glimpse of the Portuguese youth of the 90's, being nominated for the Golden Leopard at the Locarno Film Festival.

Working also as a producer and screenwriter, Sapinho is the founder and owner of the independent production company Rosa Filmes, which brought to light other directors as João Pedro Rodrigues and Manuela Viegas.

In 1999, the film Gloria, written by him and the director Manuela Viegas, was in competition at the Berlinale.

In 2003, Sapinho released The Policewoman, his second feature, a story of a mother and her son based on the idea that in the modern times some women might no longer remember what it means to be a mother. It was at the official selection of the Berlin International Film Festival.

In 2005, Sapinho released Bosnia Diaries. Shot in 1996 and 1998, taking almost ten years to complete, it is a cinematic diary documentary about his experiences in Bosnia during and after the Yugoslav Wars. It had ir's world premiere at the Pusan International Film Festival.

In 2011, after working for ten years – most of them simultaneously in Bosnia Diaries and in it – Sapinho completes his fourth feature, This Side of Resurrection, which had its world premiere at the official selection of the 2011 Toronto International Film Festival.

== Filmography as a director ==
- 2011 – This Side of Resurrection (Deste Lado da Ressurreição)
- 2005 – Bosnia Diaries (Diários da Bósnia)
- 2003 – The Policewoman (Mulher Polícia)
- 1995 – Haircut (Corte de Cabelo)
- 1988 – At Waterside (À Beira-Bar) (short film)

== Rosa Filmes' filmography ==
- 2011 – This Side of Resurrection (Portuguese: Deste Lado da Ressurreição). Directed by Joaquim Sapinho
- 2011 – What's New About Love? (Portuguese: O Que Há De Novo No Amor?). Directed by Mónica Santana Baptista, Hugo Martins, Rui Santos, Tiago Nunes, Hugo Alves and Patrícia Raposo.
- 2009 – To Die Like a Man (Portuguese: Morrer como um homem). Directed by João Pedro Rodrigues
- 2008 – 4 Hearts (Portuguese: 4 Copas). Directed Manuel Mozos
- 2005 – Bosnia Diaries (Portuguese: Diários da Bósnia). Directed by Joaquim Sapinho
- 2005 – Two Drifters (Portuguese: Odete). Directed by João Pedro Rodrigues
- 2003 – The Policewoman (Portuguese: A Mulher Polícia). Directed by Joaquim Sapinho
- 2000 – The Phantom (Portuguese: O Fantasma). Directed by João Pedro Rodrigues
- 1999 – Mal. Directed by Alberto Seixas Santos
- 1999 – Gloria (Portuguese: Glória). Directed by Manuela Viegas
- 1999 – Jorge Molder. Directed by José Neves
- 1998 – A Trip to Expo (Portuguese: Viagem à Expo). Directed by João Pedro Rodrigues
- 1998 – José Cardoso Pires Logbook (Portuguese: José Cardoso Pires – Diário de Bordo). Directed by Manuel Mozos
- 1997 – This is my Home (Portuguese: Esta é a Minha Casa). Directed by João Pedro Rodrigues
- 1997 – Happy Birthday! (Portuguese: Parabéns!). Directed by João Pedro Rodrigues
- 1997 – Portuguese Cinema? (Portuguese: Cinema Português?). Directed Manuel Mozos
- 1995 – Haircut (Portuguese: Corte de Cabelo). Directed by Joaquim Sapinho
- 1995 – Cinéma, de notre temps: Shohei Imamura – Le libre penseur. Directed by Paulo Rocha
- 1994 – Julião Sarmento. Directed by Joaquim Sapinho
- 1994 – Lisbon in Film (Portuguese: Lisboa no Cinema). Directed Manuel Mozos
- 1993 – Mr. Portugal in Tokushima (Portuguese: Portugaru San – O Sr. Portugal em Tokushima. Directed by Paulo Rocha
