= List of Portuguese films of 2018 =

A list of Portuguese films that were first released in 2018.

Release date	Title	Director	Cast	Genre	Notes	Ref
January 18	Bad Investigate	Luís Ismael		Action, comedy, crime		
February 8	Amor Amor	Jorge Cramez		Romance		
February 22	Todas as Cartas de Rimbaud	Edmundo Cordeiro		Documentary		
February 28	Ramiro	Manuel Mozos		Drama		
March 8	Correspondências	Rita Azevedo Gomes		Biography		
March 15	Colo	Teresa Villaverde		Drama		
March 22	Aparição	Fernando Vendrell		Drama, romance		
April 5	Encontro Silencioso	Miguel Clara Vasconcelos		Adventure, drama, mystery		
April 12	Soldado Milhões	Gonçalo Galvão Teles, Jorge Paixão da Costa		Biography, war		
April 19	O Canto de Ossobó	Silas Tiny		Documentary		
May 3	Zama	Lucrecia Martel		Drama		
May 3	Ruth	António Pinhão Botelho		Biography		
May 10	Luz Obscura	Susana de Sousa Dias		Documentary		
May 24	O Labirinto da Saudade	Miguel Gonçalves Mendes		Biography		
May 31	Cabaret Maxime	Bruno de Almeida		Drama		
June 21	Spell Reel	Filipa César		Documentary		
June 28	A Pedra Não Espera	Graça Castanheira		Documentary		
July 5	Leviano	Justin Amorim		Crime, drama, mystery		
July 26	Linhas de Sangue	Manuel Pureza, Sérgio Graciano		Action, comedy		
August 30	Milla	Valérie Massadian		Drama		
September 6	Vazante	Daniela Thomas		Adventure, drama		
September 6	Joaquim	Marcelo Gomes		Biography		
September 20	Mariphasa	Sandro Aguilar		Drama		
September 27	A Árvore	André Gil Mata		Drama, war		
October 4	Praça Paris	Lúcia Murat		Drama		
October 11	The Black Book	Valeria Sarmiento		Drama		
October 11	9 Dedos	F. J. Ossang		Adventure, drama		
October 11	Como Fernando Pessoa Salvou Portugal	Eugène Green		Short, biography		
October 18	Pedro e Inês	António Ferreira		Drama		
October 31	Raiva	Sérgio Tréfaut		Drama		
November 8	Carga	Bruno Gascon		Drama		
November 22	Doutores Palhaços	Hélder Faria, Bernardo Lopes		Documentary		
November 29	Djon África	Filipa Reis, João Miller Guerra		Drama		
December 6	Parque Mayer	António-Pedro Vasconcelos		Drama		
December 6	Our Madness	João Viana		Drama		

== See also ==
- 2018 in Portugal
