= Gloria (1999 Portuguese film) =

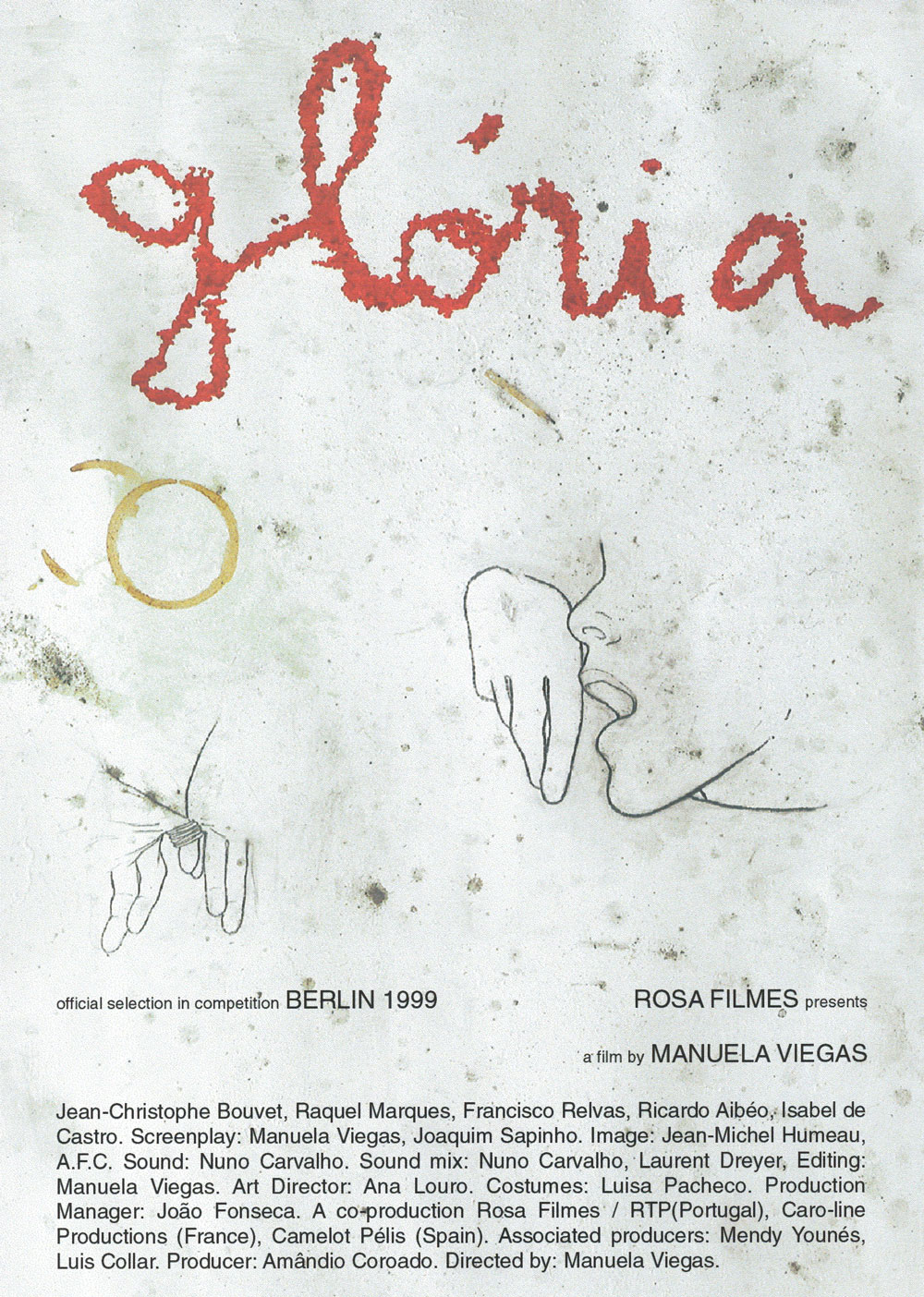
- 1999 theatrical release poster
- Directed by: Manuela Viegas
- Screenplay by: Manuela Viegas; Joaquim Sapinho
- Produced by: Amândio Coroado
- Starring: Jean-Christophe Bouvet; Raquel Marques; Francisco Relvas; Ricardo Aibéo; Isabel de Castro; Paula Só; Carlos Melo
- Cinematography: Jean-Michel Humeau
- Edited by: Manuela Viegas
- Production company: Rosa Filmes
- Release date: 1999
- Running time: 110 minutes
- Country: Portugal
- Language: Portuguese

Gloria (Portuguese: Glória) is an independent Portuguese drama film directed by Manuela Viegas and written by Joaquim Sapinho, produced at Portuguese independent production company Rosa Filmes. The poster of the film was designed by Portuguese artist Julião Sarmento.

== Plot ==
Gloria is set against the backdrop of a rural landscape slowly disappearing in modern Portugal. The small border town of Vila de Santiago, once a booming trade center for illegal trafficking, is about to become a ghost town, as a new motorway is to bypass the city and the railway station is being closed. Its stationmaster, Vincente, is preparing to retire. Many young people have moved out, leaving the children to be brought up by the elderly, including thirteen-year-old Glória and her friend Ivan. Glória's life suddenly changes with the arrival of Vincente's younger brother, Mauro, who has just come out of prison and has some old issues to settle. Mauro begins to charge around the station on his motorbike, while Glória's friendship with Ivan is put to test on account of her attraction to older Mauro.

== Cast ==
- Jean-Christophe Bouvet as Vicente
- Raquel Marques as Glória
- Francisco Relvas as Ivan
- Ricardo Aibéo as Mauro
- Paula Só as Noémia
- Isabel de Castro as Teresa

== Production ==
The film was the directorial debut of the director Manuela Viegas. Written by her and Joaquim Sapinho, the film was produced at Rosa Filmes simultaneously with The Policewoman, which, directed by Sapinho, was also edited by Viegas. The two films share a common aesthetic, theme, and interconnected references, preserving, however, the different voice of each director. The result were two films that are like the two sides of a same coin, Gloria a more feminine, in opposition to The Policewoman, which is more masculine.

== Reception ==
Gloria was part of the official competition of the 49th Berlin International Film Festival, being the only Portuguese film to ever do so until Tabu was selected in 2012. The film was at screened at the Harvard Film Archive and at the Anthology Film Archives as part of The School of Reis program.
