= Lua Vermelha =

- Genre: Drama; Fantasy
- Created by: Pedro Lopes; Inês Gomes; Ana Morgado; Miguel M. Matias; Ricardo Oliveira; Rita Roberto
- Directed by: Sérgio Graciano; Hugo Xavier; Manuel Pureza
- Starring: Mafalda Luís de Castro; Rui Porto Nunes
- Opening theme: Morte ao Sol (Death to the Sun) - Remake from GNR
- Ending theme: Morte ao Sol (Death to the Sun) - Remake from GNR
- Country of origin: Portugal
- Original language: Portuguese
- No. of seasons: 1

Production
- Producer: Sofia Morais
- Running time: 45 minutes

Original release
- Network: SIC
- Release: January 31, 2010

Lua Vermelha ('Red Moon') is a Portuguese teen television series about vampires that aired on SIC. Produced in partnership with SP TV, Lua Vermelha premiered on January 31, 2010, airing on the weekends at 9:00 p.m. The series finale aired on May 27, 2012.

== Synopsis ==
The Colégio Vale da Luz (Valley of Light Boarding School), a boarding school located in the middle of the Sintra Mountains, is a fierce institution known for its discipline and the way it shapes and prepares its students, several of which are in a peculiar or critical situation (either orphans, problematic teenagers or gifted ones), that for obvious reasons don't fit in the usual school system. It is there where Isabel, a 17-year-old girl who just lost her parents, will find friends and a mystical, mysterious and impossible love. When her parents died, Isabel was put under her uncles' care, but they only care for her money. On her first day at school, a very special boy will catch her eyes, maybe even too special.

Hanging out only with his "siblings", Afonso Azevedo is known, just like them, for being attractive, ethereal and untouchable. What no one knows is that Afonso and his "siblings", Beatriz and Henrique, hold a very old and dangerous secret: they are vampires. A typical Romeo and Juliet kind of story with a mystical and magic touch, that may just end with a happy ending.

== Cast ==
- Mafalda Luís de Castro as Isabel Oliveira
- Rui Porto Nunes as Afonso Azevedo (186 years old)
- António Camelier as Henrique Azevedo (83 years old)
- Catarina Mago as Beatriz Azevedo (354 years old)
- Anabela Teixeira as Francisca Azevedo (115 years old)
- Afonso Araújo as Filipe Sousa
- Diogo Costa Reis as Joel Soares
- Henrique Carvalho as Hélio Raposo
- Pedro Jervis as Gustavo Vilaverde
- Cecília Henriques as Matilde Borges
- Eva Barros as Joana Amarante
- Laura Figueiredo as Laura Telles
- Inês Aires Pereira as Luísa Ruas
- Joana Oliveira as Rita Gouveia
- Raimundo Cosme as Tiago Marques
- Tiago Teotónio Pereira as Manuel (Manel) Zarco
- Carla Lopes as Clara Mendonça
- Sara Vicente as Maria do Céu Lage
- Raquel André as Vânia Fraga
- Rodolfo Venâncio as Edmundo Pestana (Ed)
- Matilde Alçada as Daniela Lage
- Alexandre Silva as Simão Paradela
- Cristina Cunha as Magda Sousa
- Ivo Alexandre as Abílio da Gampedangera
- Joana Balaguer as Sofia Pinhão
- Luís Vicente as Lúcio Cunha
- Ronaldo Bonacchi as Guilherme Cardoso
- Sofia Espírito Santo as Fátima Loureiro
- Dimitry Bogomolov as Máximo (1,000 years old)
- Carlos Pimenta as Rogério Nogueira
- David Pereira Bastos as Samuel Garcia
- Filipe Vargas as André
- Paulo Oom as Raul Andrade

Guest stars

- Diana Chaves as Carolina (94 years old)
- Inês Castel-Branco as Helena Bathory (450 years old)
- Merche Romero as Diana Amaral (51 years old)
- Ricardo Pereira as Vasco Galvão (585 years old)
- Virgílio Castelo as Jaguar
- Tobias Monteiro as Xavier (over 100 years old)
- Francisco Areosa as Duarte
- Tomás Alves as Victor (186 years old)
- Pedro Lacerda as Octávio Raposo (16 years old)
- Diogo Morgado as Artur (915 years old)
- Dânia Neto as Eva (138 years old)
- Joana Seixas as Verónica
- Vítor Gonçalves as Vladimir Polansky (760 years old)
- João Manzarra as Mais Antigo (4,000 years old)
- Sofia Nicholson as Daniela's mother
- Igor Almeida

== Filming location ==
In Lua Vermelha, the characters meet in two main sets: The mountains and the boarding school.

Most of the vampire scenes take place in the Sintra Mountains. All of the wild and forest-like scenes are recorded there.

The outside of the Colégio Vale da Luz (Valley of Light Boarding School) was filmed in Cascais at the Palace of the Condes de Castro Guimarães (also known as the Tower of St. Sebastian), a 19th-century palace built in a small cove which stretches to the ocean.

The image sequences that appear sometimes were filmed in the Convento dos Capuchos and in the Sintra Mountains.

The inside of buildings (the school, the bar and the headquarters of Eternal Light) were all filmed in a studio.

== Soundtrack ==
- "Morte ao Sol" – Remake from GNR
- "Lua Vermelha" – David Rossi e Ana Vieira
- "Ai se ele cai" – Xutos e Pontapés
- "Embora doa" – Klepht
- "Balas de Prata" – Sebenta
- "Tudo de Novo" – Klepht
- "Cada dia que passa" – Tambor
- "A vida dos outros" – Pluto
- "Contos de Fadas de Sintra e Lisboa" – Os Pontos Negros
- "Olhos de quem" – Sebenta
- "Linhas Cruzadas" – Virgem Suta
- "Apenas mais um dia" – Manga
- "Sangue Oculto" – GNR
- "Morfina" – Mundo Cão
- "Ela era só mais uma" – Classificados

== See also ==
- Vampire film
- List of vampire television series
