= This Side of Resurrection =

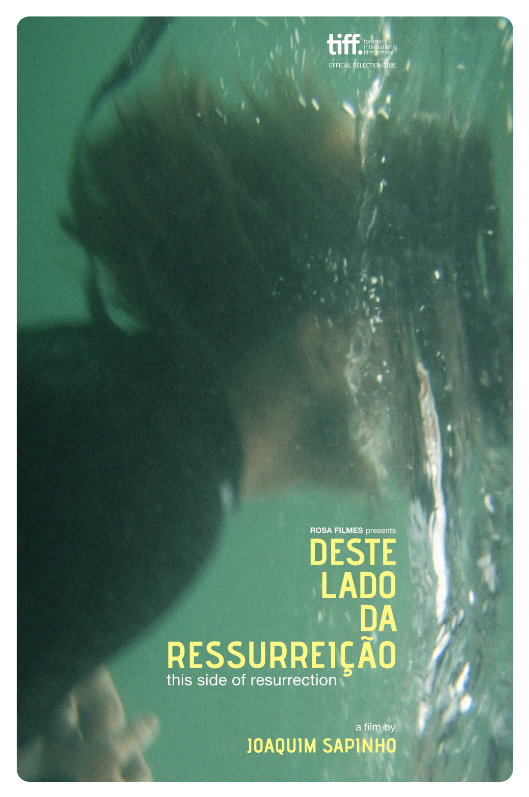
- Original premiere poster at TIFF
- Directed by: Joaquim Sapinho
- Screenplay by: Joaquim Sapinho; Mónica Santana Baptista; Rui Alexandre Santos
- Produced by: Maria João Sigalho; Pedro Fernandes Duarte; Rui Alexandre Santos
- Starring: Joana Barata; Pedro Sousa; Sofia Grilo; Pedro Carmo; Mariana Pacheco; João Cardoso; Luís Castro
- Cinematography: Leonardo Simões
- Edited by: Rui Santos
- Production company: Rosa Filmes
- Release date: 8 September 2011 (Toronto)
- Running time: 110 minutes
- Country: Portugal
- Language: Portuguese

This Side of Resurrection (Portuguese: Deste Lado da Ressurreição) is a Portuguese independent drama film written and directed by Joaquim Sapinho. It was produced by the independent production company Rosa Filmes and had its world premiere at the 2011 edition of the Toronto International Film Festival as part of the Visions programme.

== Plot ==
The film tells the story of a sister and a brother, Inês and Rafael. Since the divorce of their parents, their family hasn't seen Rafael. Inês runs away from home looking for Rafael, only to find out that he is at Guincho Beach, surfing. Rafael is a former surf champion who tests the limits of his life every day by seeking out the most dangerous waves. When the two siblings meet, Guincho makes them come together in a promise of paradise on earth, as it is the last place where their family lived happily together. But Inês is surprised one day when she finds her brother looking fixedly to the Serra de Sintra mountain range, where the Convent of the Capuchos was once his refuge. She fears that she has brought him back memories of their parents' separation. Rafael is in a crisis of faith. When one day he disappears, Inês knows he has gone back to the convent, and she starts doing what she can to bring him back to her.

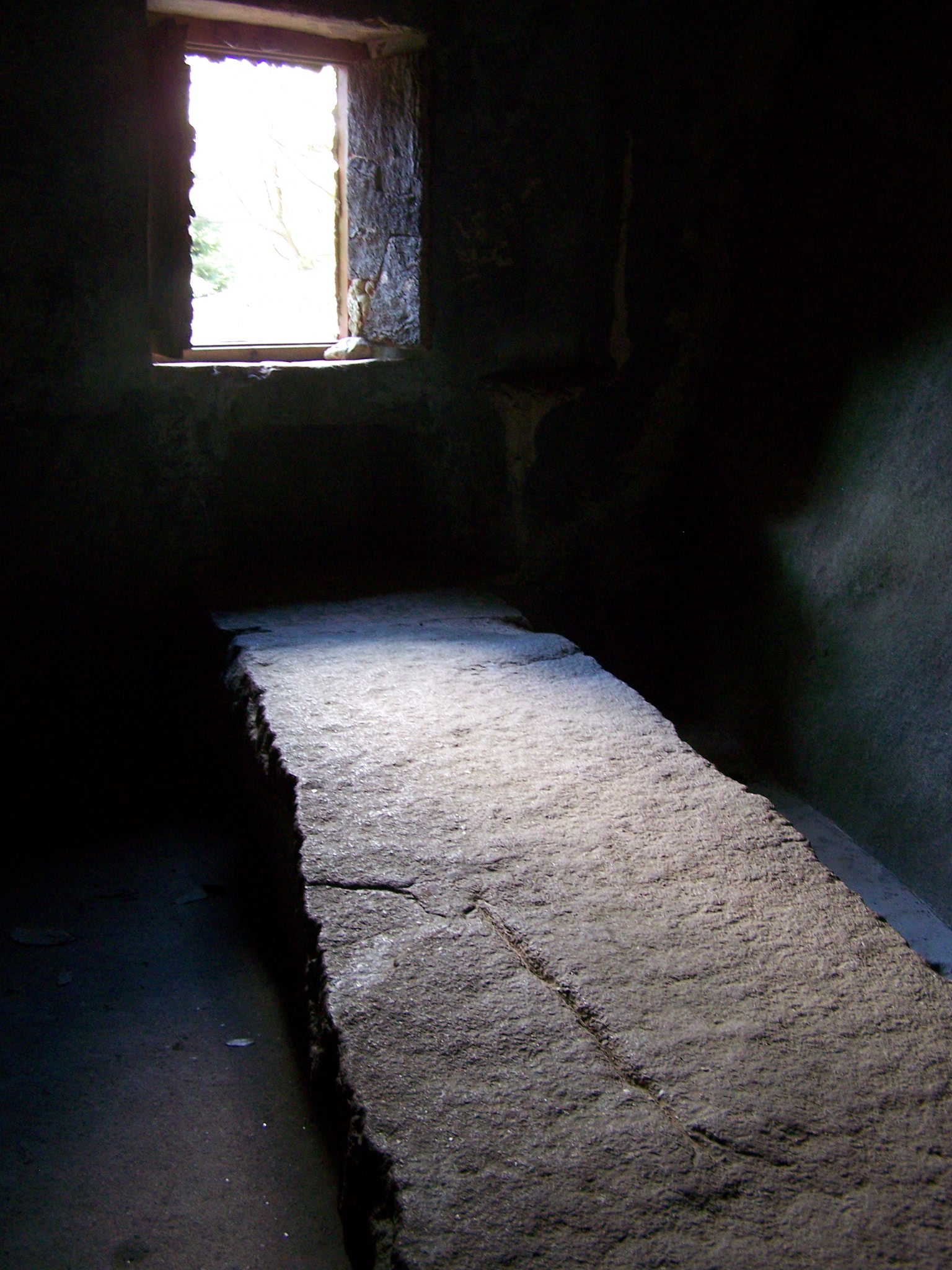
The humble hermitage Convent of the Capuchos, where the film was shot, secluded in the forests of Sintra Nature Park

== Cast ==
- Pedro Sousa as Rafael
- Joana Barata as Inês
- Sofia Grilo as the mother
- Pedro Carmo as brother Simão
- Luís Castro as brother Lucas
- João Cardoso as João
- Mariana Pacheco as Mariana

== Release and reception ==
The film had its world premiere in the official selection of the 2011 edition of the Toronto International Film Festival, as part of the "Visions" programme. It was also presented as the official selection of the 2011 edition of the São Paulo International Film Festival. An American premiere took place at the Harvard Film Archive, followed by the Anthology Film Archives, as part of the School of Reis program.
