= Haircut (film) =

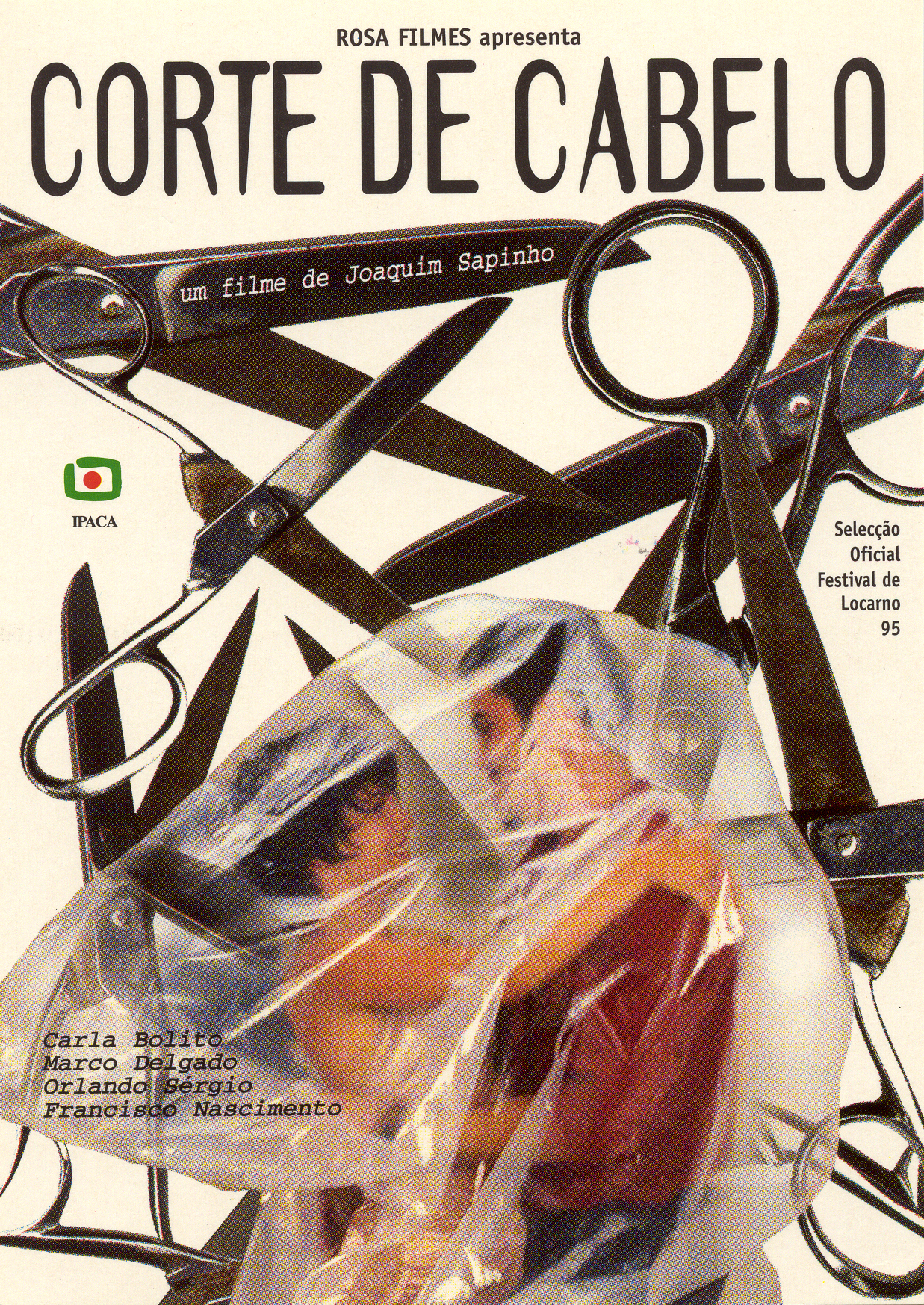
- Theatrical release poster
- Directed by: Joaquim Sapinho
- Screenplay by: Joaquim Sapinho; Manuela Viegas; Amândio Coroado
- Produced by: Amândio Coroado
- Starring: Carla Bolito; Marco Delgado; Orlando Sérgio; Francisco Nascimento; Melo D
- Cinematography: Luís Correia
- Edited by: Manuela Viegas
- Production company: Rosa Filmes
- Release date: 1995
- Running time: 91 minutes
- Country: Portugal
- Language: Portuguese

Haircut (Portuguese: Corte de Cabelo) is an independent Portuguese drama film directed by Joaquim Sapinho, produced at Rosa Filmes, which was nominated for the Golden Leopard at the 1995 Locarno International Film Festival.

== Reception ==
Being nominated for the Golden Leopard at the 1995 Locarno International Film Festival, Haircut also won the award for best film at the 1996 Angers European Film Festival, and the Best Actress Award for Carla Bolito at the Geneva Film Festival. In its home country, Haircut was highly acclaimed both by the critic and by the audience in an unprecedented way for Portugal. It was considered the best depiction of the Portuguese youth of the nineties captured on film. The Brazilian newspaper Estado de São Paulo called it the first post-modern Portuguese film.

== Production ==
Haircut was not only the directorial debut of Portuguese director Joaquim Sapinho, but also the film debut for most of the cast and crew of the film. Haircut became famous even before having been shot, for its long pre-production, which consisted on thousands of casting calls, which would finally end with the finding of the leading lady Carla Bolito. The film was shot in a series of popular locations in Lisbon where, however, no film had ever been shot before, like the 1960s expressionist Mexicana café (architect Jorge Ferreira Chaves), the 1980s post-modern shopping center Amoreiras or the Príncipe Real Garden where, some years later, the final scene of João César Monteiro's film Vai e Vem would be shot.

== Plot ==
The film is set in Lisbon, and tells the story of a day in the life of Rita and Paulo, a Portuguese young couple of the 90's, belonging to the first generation of Portuguese to grow up inside the European Union. The fast changing city around them makes them wish to break with all traditions and live the day the get married (only civil marriage) like it is an ordinary day. However, for some reason Rita wants to be absolutely sure Paulo loves her and decides to cut her long black hair short before the ceremony. Rita and Paulo still get married, but Rita's haircut would drastically and unexpectedly change their relationship.

== Cast ==
- Carla Bolito as Rita
- Marco Delgado as Paulo
- Francisco Nascimento as Lucas
- Orlando Sérgio as the black man
