= Orlando Sérgio =

Angolan actor

- Born: Orlando Sérgio; 1960 (age 65–66); Malange, Angola
- Occupation: Actor
- Years active: 1994–present

Orlando Sérgio (born 1960), is an Angolan actor. He is best known for the roles in the films Letters from War, Liberdade and The Hero.

== Filmography ==
Year	Film	Role	Genre	Ref.
1994	Sozinhos em Casa	Futunga	TV series	
1995	Queridas e Maduras		TV series	
1995	Haircut	Black Man	Film	
1995	Sandra, the Rebel Princess	Soldat africain	TV mini-series	
1995	Combate de Negro e de Cães		TV movie	
1996	Novacek	Jorge	TV series	
1996	Polícias	Marido de Bia	TV series	
1997	As Aventuras do Camilo	Hóspede	TV series	
1997	Morte Macaca	Priest	Short film	
1998	Não Há Duas Sem Três	Henrique Heitor	TV series	
1998	No Fotógrafo		TV Short	
2000	Camilo na Prisão	Juvenal	TV series	
2004	The Hero	Minister	Film	
2011	Liberdade		Short film	
2013	Njinga: Queen of Angola	Jaga Casacassage	Film	
2014	Jikulumessu	José Loca	TV series	
2014	Njinga, Rainha de Angola	Jaga Casacassage	TV series	
2016	Letters from War	Catolo	Film	
2016	Rainha das Flores	Dr. Neves	TV series	
2017	Filha da Lei	Rogério Almeida	TV series	
2018	Paixão	Recluso	TV series	
2018	Alma e Coração	Agostinho	TV series	
2019	Teorias da Conspiração	Procurador	TV series	
