= Convent of the Capuchos (Sintra) =

Convent in Portugal

Convent of the Order of Friars Minor Capuchin
- Convento dos Capuchos
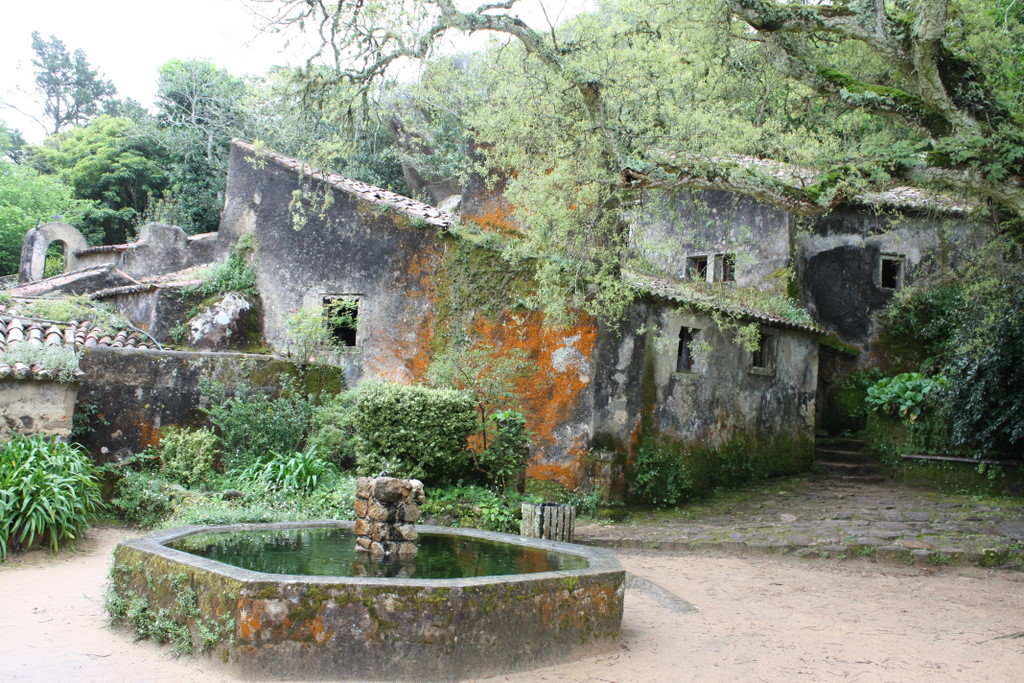
- View of the Terreiro do Fonte, the main internal courtyard of the Convent of Santa Cruz
- Interactive map of the Convent of the Order of Friars Minor Capuchin area

General information
- Type: Convent
- Architectural style: Medieval
- Location: São Pedro de Penaferrim, Sintra, Portugal
- Coordinates: 38°47′3.97″N 9°26′17.72″W
- Opened: 1548
- Owner: Portuguese Republic

Technical details
- Material: Masonry, plaster

Website
- http://www.parquesdesintra.pt/index.aspx?p=parksIndex&MenuId=5&Menu0Id=5

The Convent of the Friars Minor Capuchin, popularly known as the Convent of the Capuchos (Portuguese: Convento dos Capuchos), but officially the Convento da Santa Cruz da Serra de Sintra ("Convent of the Holy Cross of the Sintra Mountains"), is a historical convent consisting of small quarters and public spaces located in the civil parish of São Pedro de Penaferrim, in Sintra Municipality, Portugal. Its creation was associated with the Portuguese Viceroy of India, D. João de Castro, and his family, but became a pious community of reclusive clergy that continued to occupy cramped humble spaces in the complex until the religious orders were abolished in Portugal.

== History ==
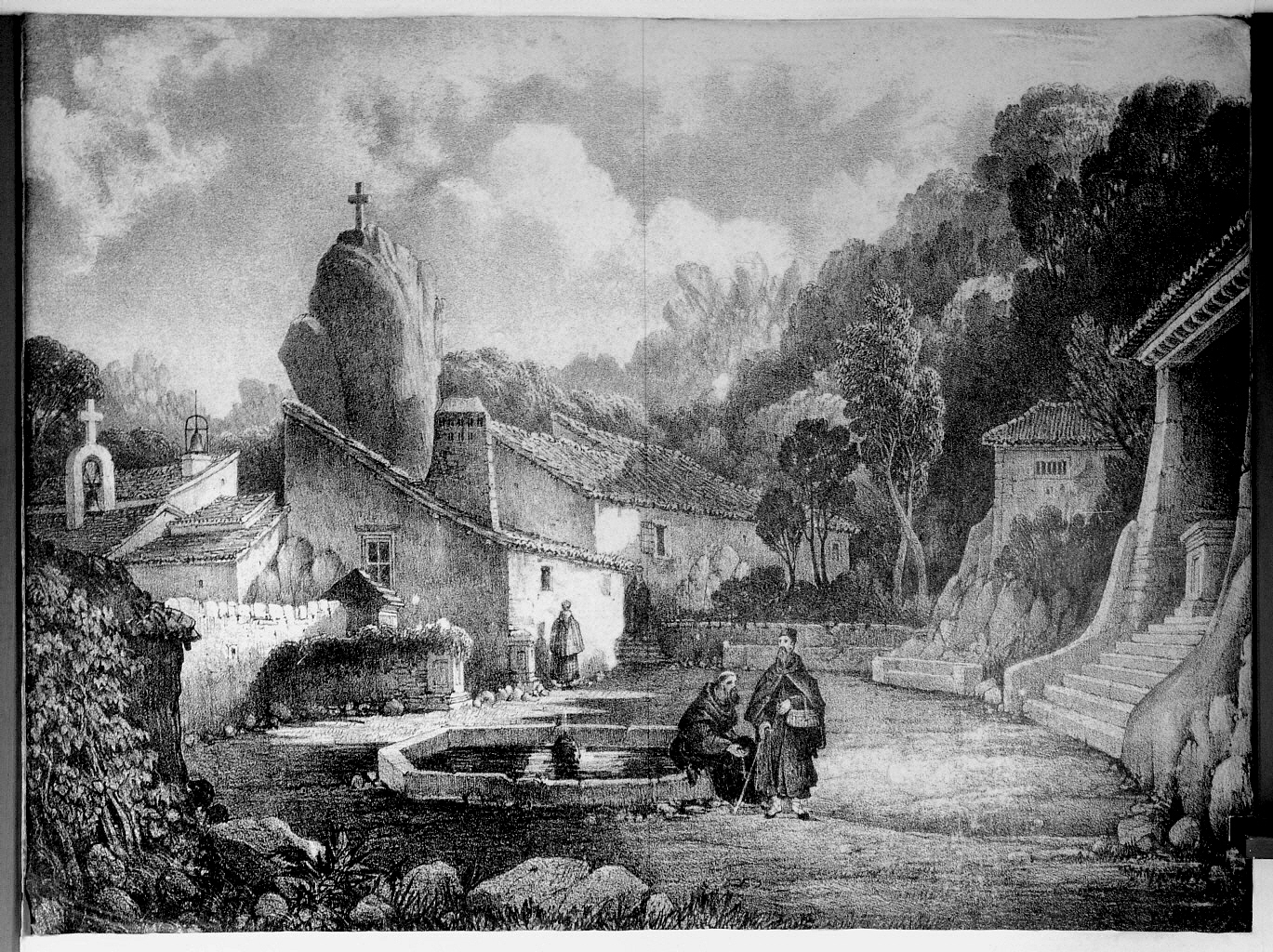
An engraving of life within the confines of the convent

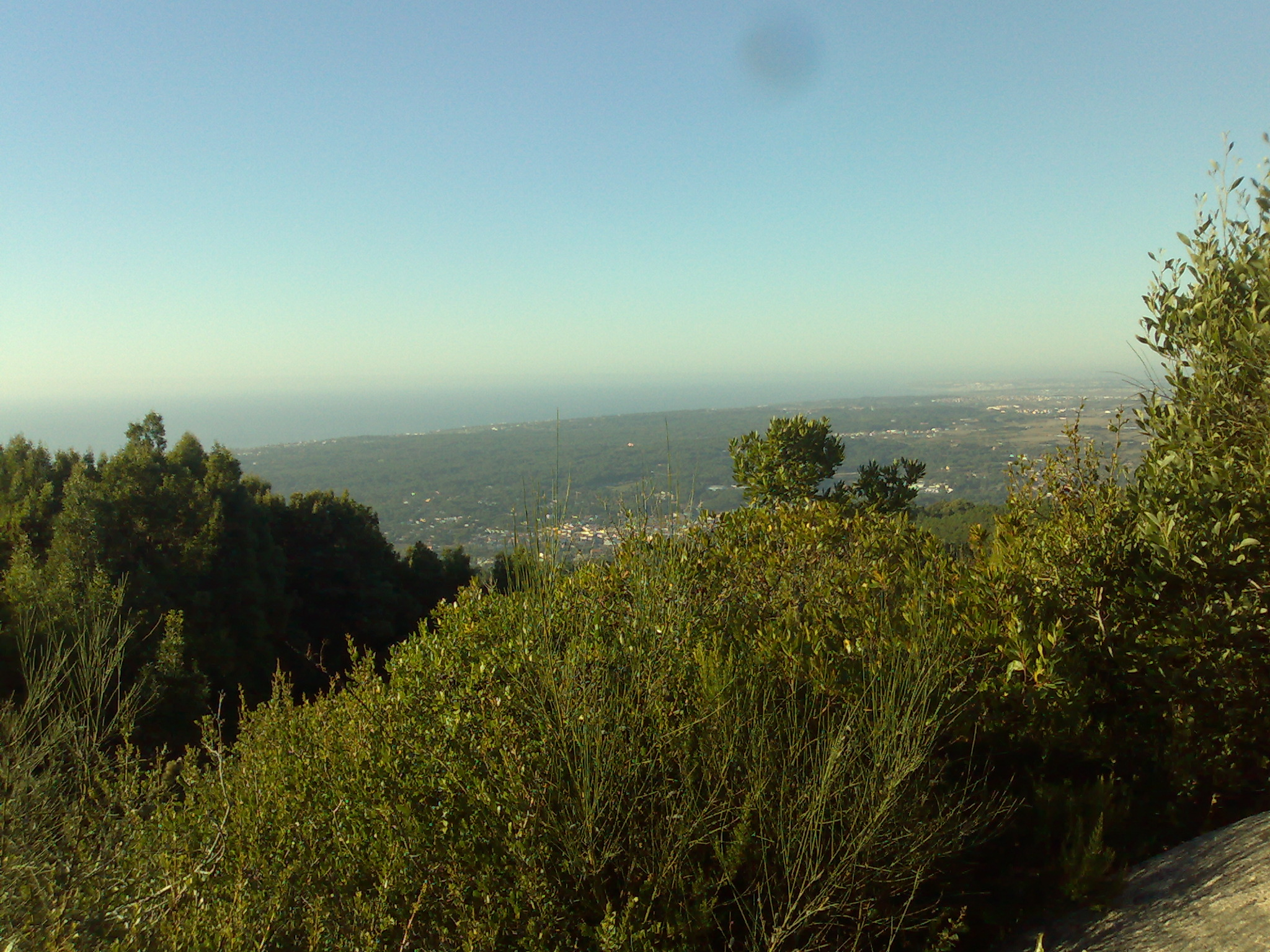
The view from the Sintra Mountains towards the Atlantic coast alongside the convent

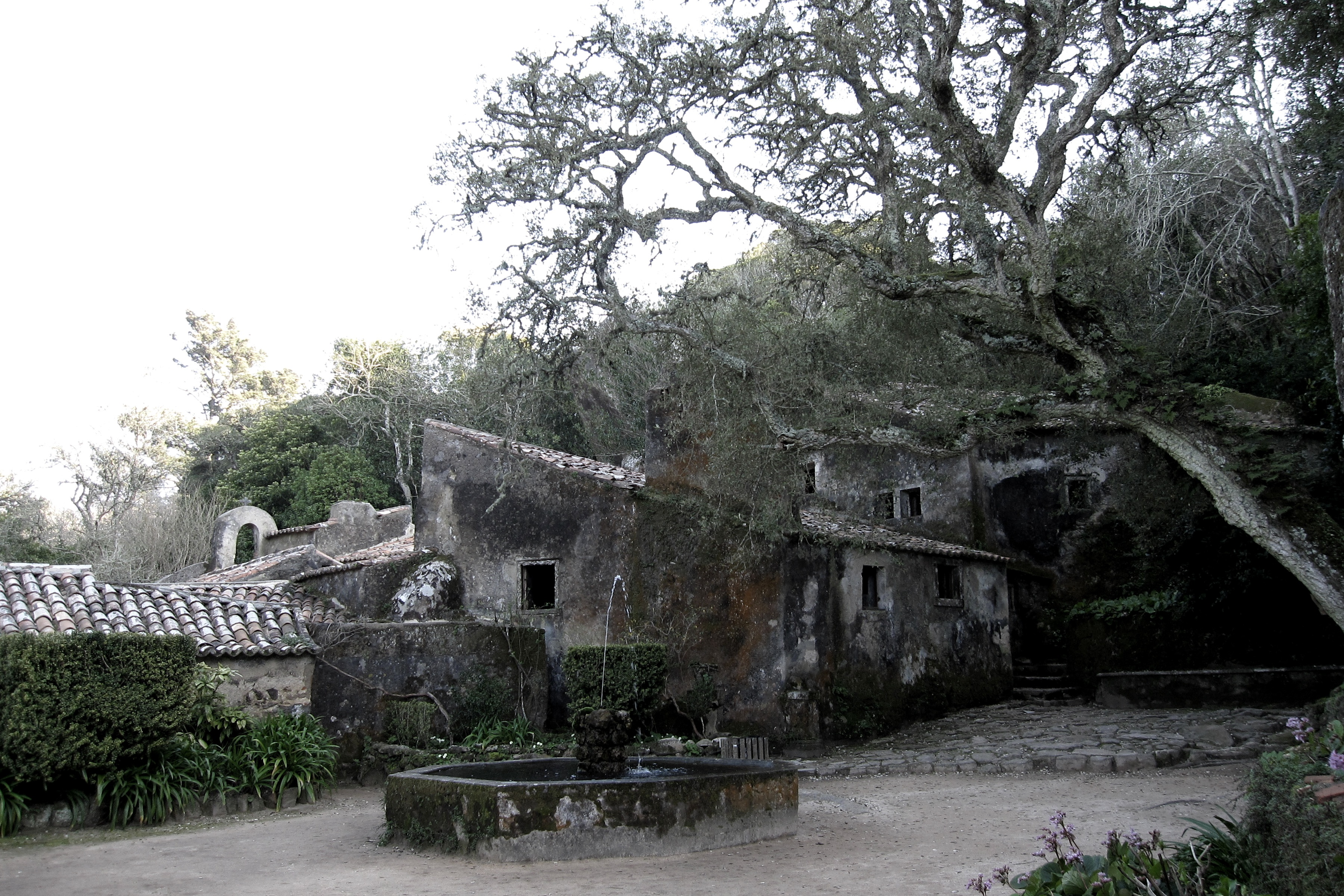
The courtyard as it looks, showing the natural weathering and symbiosis with the environment

=== 16th century ===
The convent was founded in 1560 and consisted of eight monks that arrived from the convent of Arrábida under the authority of D. Álvaro de Castro, counsellor of state and administrator for King Sebastian of Portugal. The sanctuary was established to the invocation of Santa Cruz ("Holy Cross") and was originally the inspiration of Álvaro de Castro's father, the former fourth Viceroy of India, D. João de Castro (1500–1548). According to a legend, João de Castro was hunting in the mountains of Sintra and, chasing a deer, he found himself lost. Tired from his search, he fell asleep against a rock and in a dream, he received a divine revelation to erect a Christian temple on the site. The convent followed the Franciscan rule and belonged to the Order of Friars Minor, or Capuchins.

In 1564, from an inscription found on the site, indulgences were granted by Pope Pius IV, who offered that prayers be said for the Christian princes, the Church, and the soul of deceased João de Castro.

Between 1578 and 1580, the Chapel of Santo António was constructed, along with the erection of a wall around the convent, under the orders of Cardinal Henry. The following year (around October), the convent was visited by King Philip II of Spain, newly installed King of Portugal and Spain.

The primitive community of the convent was composed of eight friars, the most famous of them being Friar Honório, who, according to the book Mirror of Penitents, composed by one of the friars, lived to be 100 years old, despite having spent the last three decades of his life in penance, living inside a small hole inside the convent, which still exists today. In 1596, friar Honório died. The story of Honório impressed later English Romantic poets, like Robert Southey and Lord Byron ("Deep in yon cave Honorius long did dwell/In hope to merit heaven, by making earth a hell").

=== 17th century ===
In the 17th century, a painting/panel of São Pascoal Bailão by Vicente Carducho was completed, while in 1610, several mural paintings were created on the exterior of the Chapel of Senhor Morto. In 1650, a marker was erected to identify the road to the convent.

In October 1654, King John IV of Portugal visited the convent, ordering the sheriff of Cascais to send the friars six dozen fish and dried meat, as well as all the fish necessary to support the festival of São Francisco. At the same time, D. Luísa de Gusmão provided the order for a moio of wheat and an arroba of cereals from annual harvests. By the second half of the 17th century, King Peter II of Portugal doubled the gift of D. Luísa de Gusmão. By 1684, the widow of Álvaro de Castro (the third patron of the convent), the lady Maria de Noronha, was buried at the door of the convent (as was the tradition at the time). Similar royal patronage was conceded by King John V of Portugal in the 18th century; he offered a pipa of olive oil to the convent per year, as well as an azulejo tile.

=== 18th and 19th centuries ===
By 1728, the convent was described by friar António da Piedade as secluded "between dense fields, high boulders, and while trees, that in this refuge produces the mountains that are so many...". Similarly, the convent was still inhabited by members of the religious community in 1787.

Between 1830 and 1837, William Burnett completed a carving on the steps leading to the Chapel of Santo António, flanked by a low wall.

As a result of the extinction of the religious orders in Portugal, in 1834, the convent was acquired by the second Count of Penamacor, D. António de Saldanha Albuquerque e Castro Ribafria (1815–1864), descendant of João de Castro. It remained in the possession of this generation until 1873, when it was acquired by Sir Francis Cook, 1st Viscount of Monserrate.

In 1889, the convent was described as "situated in the centre of a sad solitude, encircled by a dryness and whipped by gales...this small monastery, open to the rocks and containing a dozen cells, in which can barely move the disgraceful inhabitants".

=== 20th century ===
In the first half of the 20th century, the site was acquired by the State, although little was done until the middle of that century. It was bought by the Portuguese State in 1949. The DGEMN Direcção Geral dos Edifícios e Monumentos Nacionais ("General Directorate of Buildings and National Monuments") began a series of public projects to preserve the site, starting in the 1950s: in 1952, construction of the roofing of the chapel, farmhouse, and latrines; in 1954 and 1955, repairs to the water pipes and guardhouse; in 1958, repair of the roofing; in 1961, repair of the farmhouse roof; in 1963, repair of the roofing and interiors; in 1967, the replacement of two doors covered in cork, ceilings, pipes, and cleaning of the spaces. These projects continued with the Institute Florestal ("Forestry Institute") and the Direcção-Geral das Florestas ("General Directorate of Forests"), which were responsible for conservation, cleaning, and maintenance of the buildings and grounds in 1971, 1983–1985, and 1994.

During the 1920s, an image of Santa Maria Madalena still existed in a niche near the gate but was eventually collected by the state and stored in the Pena National Palace. Much later, images of Santo António and São Francisco, located in the retable in the church, and two candelabras, were stolen from the site. For reasons of security and degradation of the site, the property was closed to the public in 1998. In August 1998, the site was assaulted and robbed of several images and sculptures. These events and the continued degradation of the site resulted in the creation of the Associação dos Amigos do Convento dos Capuchos ("Association of the Friends of the Convent of the Capuchos").

The Capuchos Convent became part of the Cultural Landscape of Sintra World Heritage Site, classified by UNESCO in 1995.

=== 21st century ===
On 1 June 2001, the convent was reopened to the public, after fears of its degradation, under the concession of the Parques de Sintra Monte da Lua S.A. Between 2000 and 2001, public works, conservation and restoration of many of the buildings.

In 2011, the film This Side of Resurrection, directed by Joaquim Sapinho, was shot inside the walls of the convent.

== Architecture ==
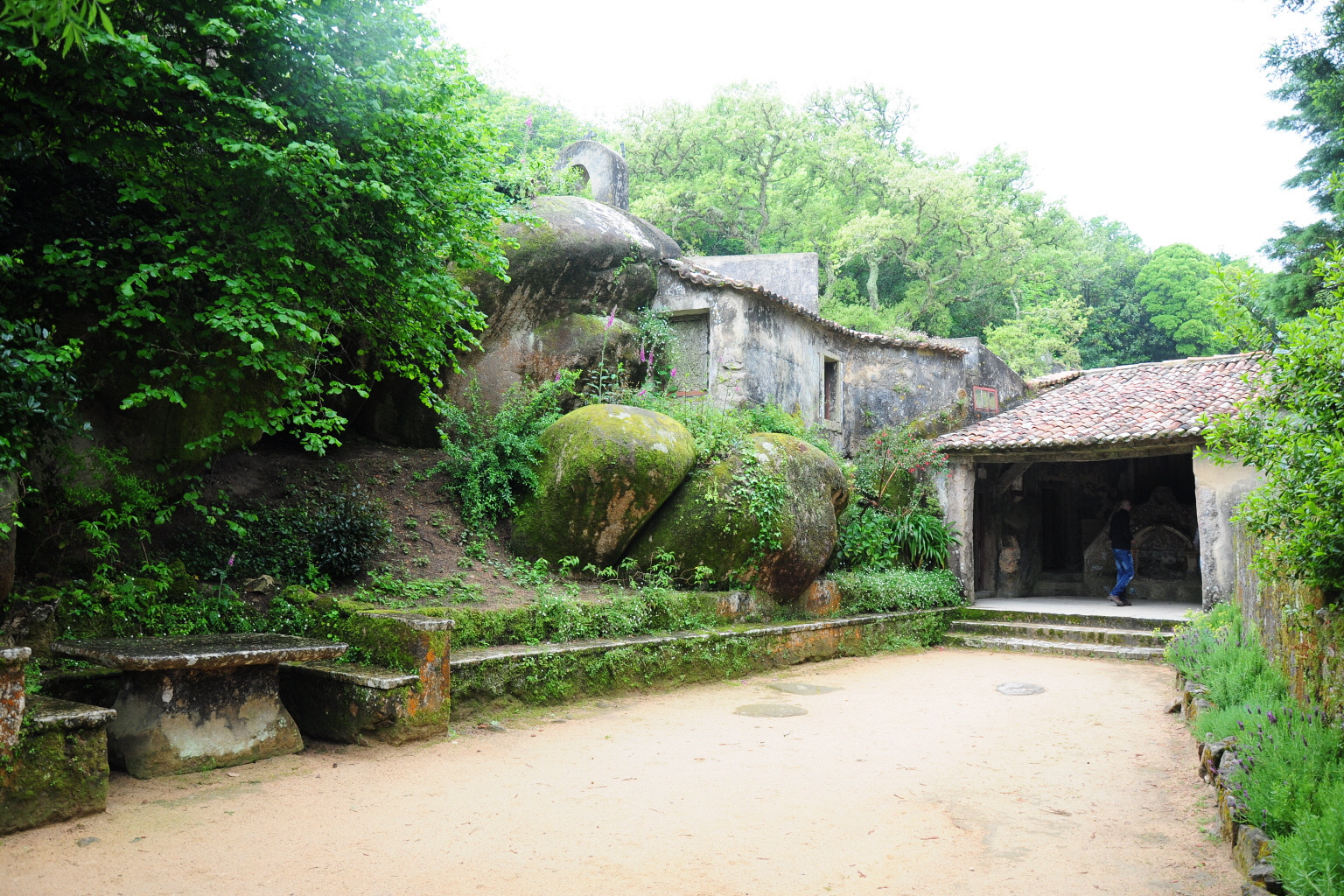
The Terreiro do Campanário showing the main complex, with the Chapel of Senhor dos Passos hidden to the right

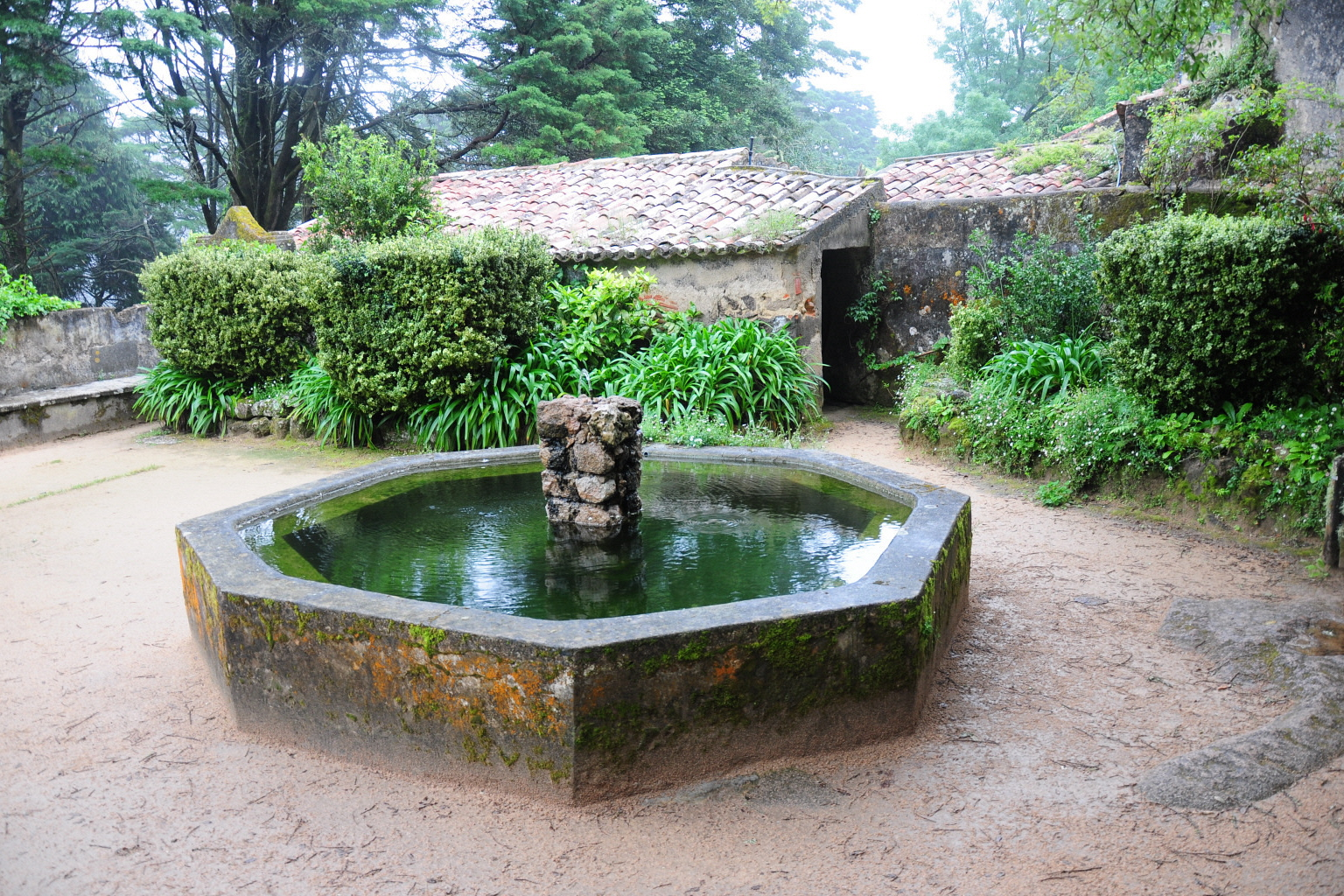
The octagonal fountain in the Pátio do Tanque ("Terrace of the Tank")

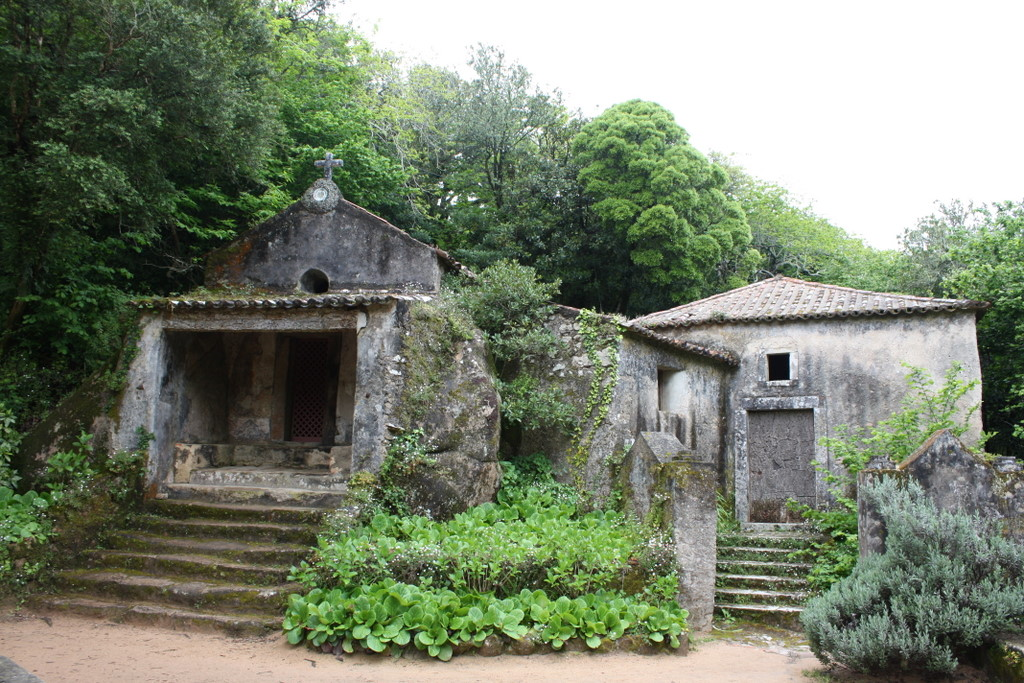
The Chapel of Santo António and Casa do Capítulo on the western extent of the convent

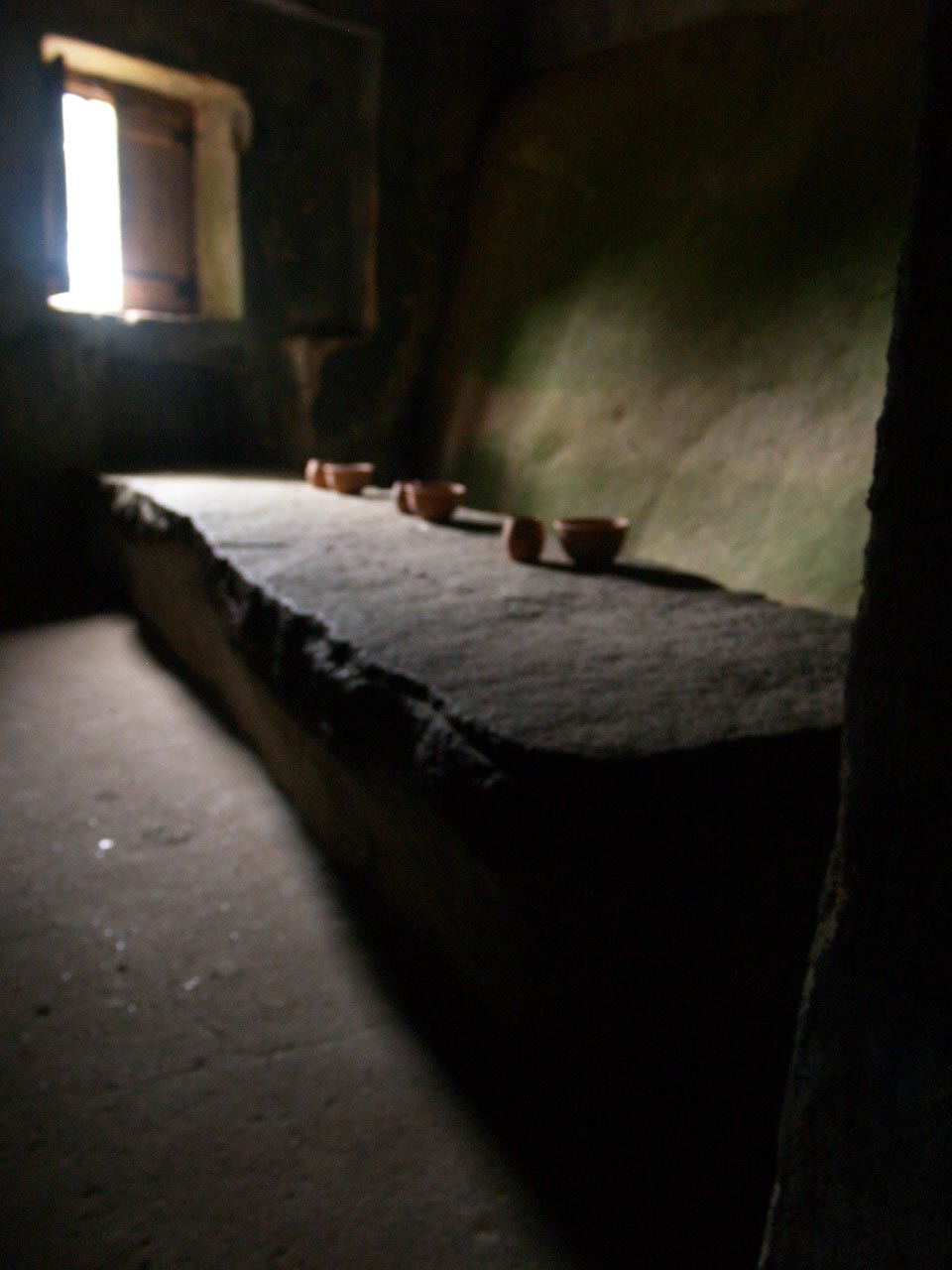
The granite slab that was donated by King Henry to the monks of the convent

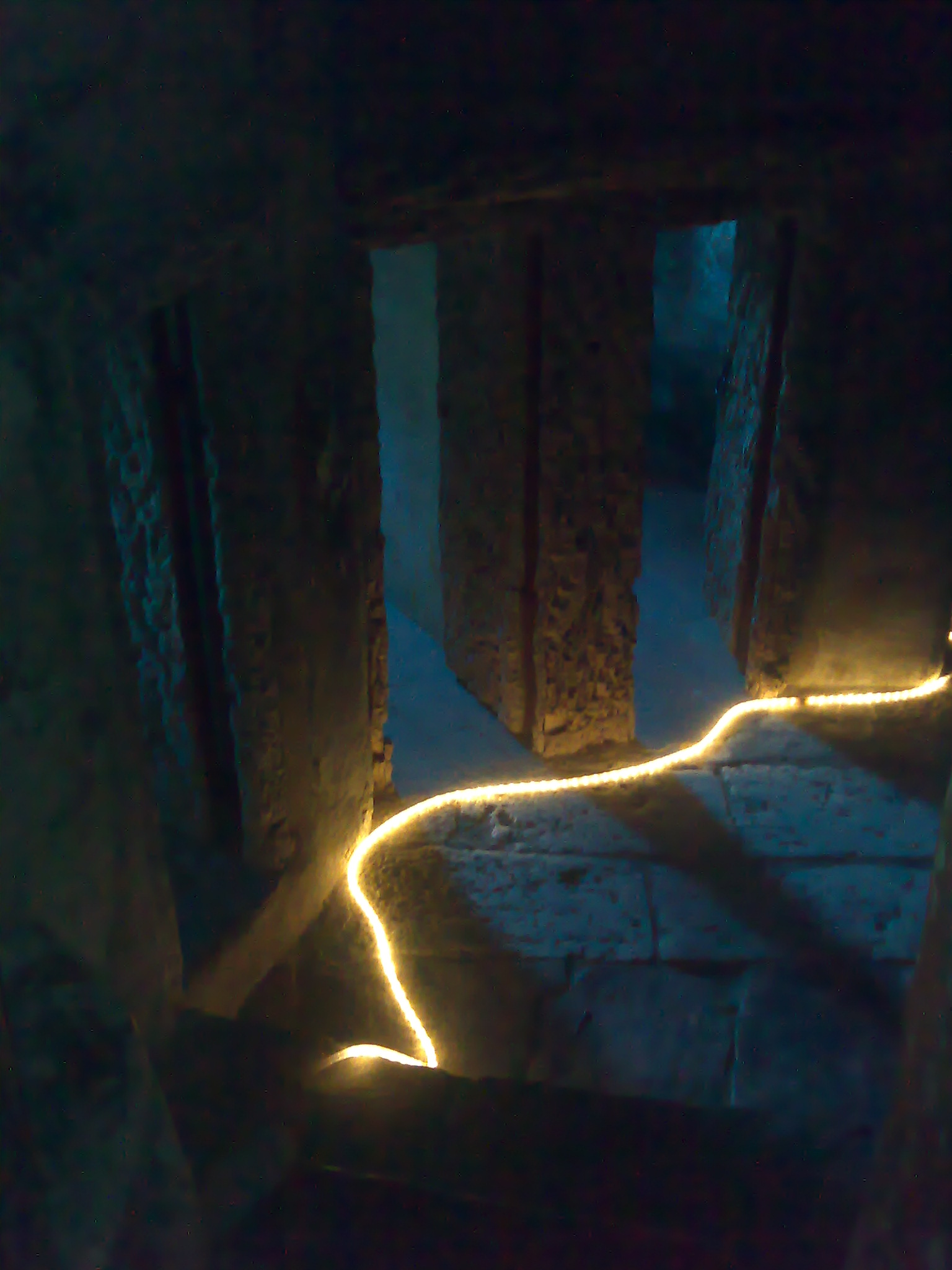
The narrow doorways to the monks' cells, lined with cork to insulate from cold and humidity

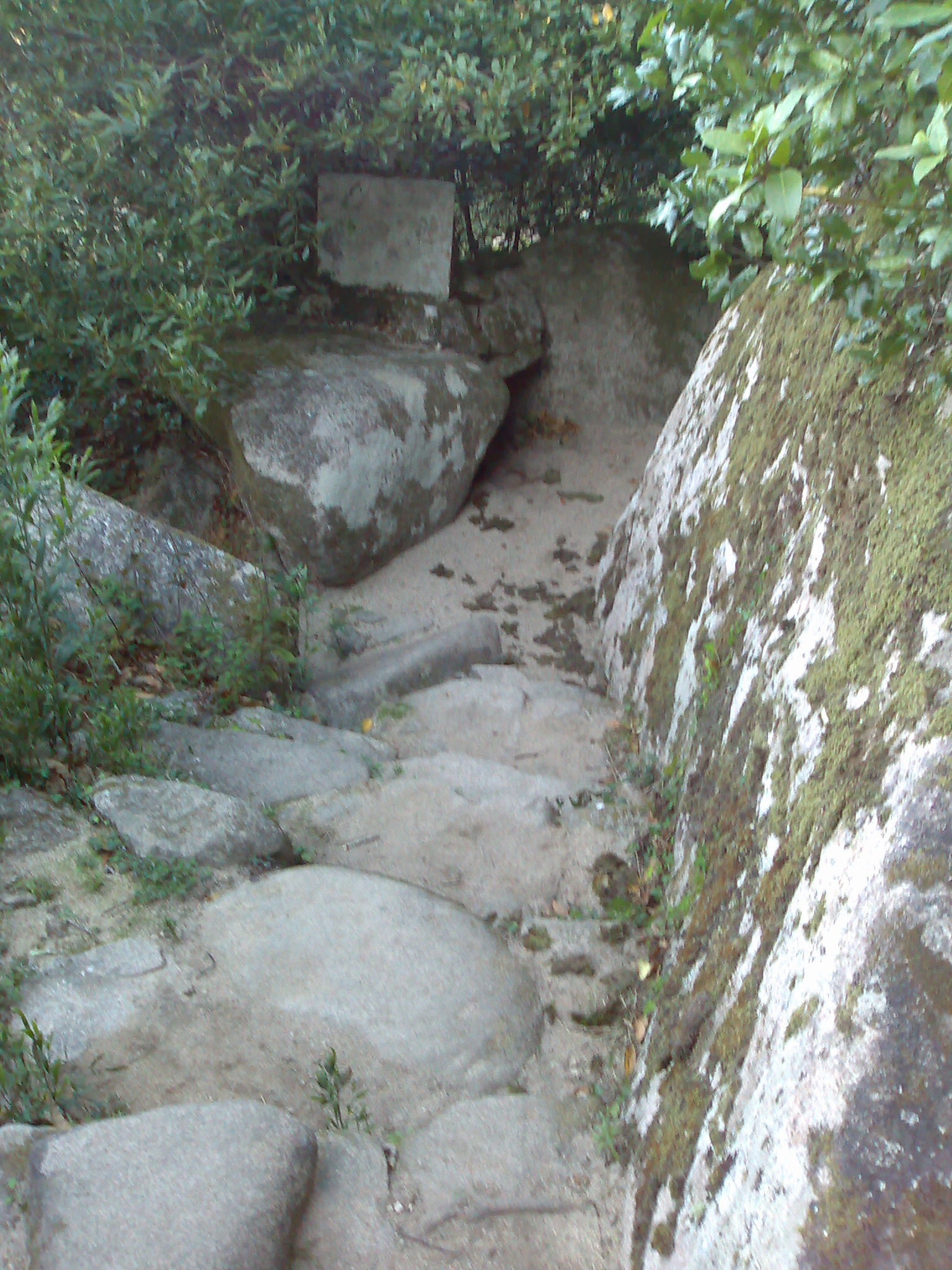
The trail leading to the grotto of friar Honório de Santa Maria

The minimalist convent was erected in harmony with its surroundings, implanted in the rocks and boulders that formed this part of the Sintra Mountains. Due to the slopes, many of the dependencies are constructed on the slopes, each level used to identify the ascendency and purification of the spirit. The "hall of retreat", which is further elevated than other spaces, is reached from a passage from the"hall of penitence". The church is integrated into the complex, with little indications from the exterior. Researchers have suggested that the composition of buildings and spaces was influenced by the number 8 (evident in the number of cells and stairs between rooms), which symbolized infinity. A comparable metaphor exists in the different roads/paths, which symbolized the dichotomy between good and bad roads to be taken in spiritual fulfillment. Poverty was the central notion that ruled the construction of the Convent of the Capuchos. The whole building is small. Its windows and doors are coated with cork, the traditional material of Portugal, the last being smaller than a man's height, to induce genuflection. Decoration is scarce and minimal. After visiting the convent in 1581, Philip I of Portugal said, "Of all my kingdoms, there are two places I estimate especially, El Escorial for being so rich, and the Convent of the Holy Cross for being so poor".

The site is located in the rural part of Sintra, along the northeastern flank of the Sintra Mountains, approximately 325 metres above sea level, in a location marked by dense vegetation and accentuated slopes, near King Ferdinand II's hunting grounds (Tapada D. Fernando II). The convent, surrounded by a forest of oak and shrubbing species of trees, is walled into an area of rocks and exposed boulders. Along Sintra's old road connecting the village to Colares and near the Palace of Monserrate, there is a road that heads towards this religious retreat, indicated by a 17th-century marker: "CAMINHO PARA O CONVENTO DE SANTA CRUZ DA SERRA, VULGO CAPUCHOS; 1650". Access to the grounds is made by a portal (in the southeast corner of the site), or by the Terreiro das Cruzes ("Terrace of Crosses"), an irregularly walled enclosure with a calvary located in the southwest corner and visitor centre. To the left of the cross in the Terrace of Crosses is the principal entrance, or Pórtico das Fragas ("Portico of the Rocks"), with an access-way comprising two large boulders, one of which is surmounted by a bell-gable. From the walled enclosure, a small flight of stairs leads into the Terreiro do Campanário ("Terrace of the Belfry"), a small irregular patio with a cross, which leads to the buildings. The southeast entrance, located a further distance from the visitor centre, comprises a gate and ancillary building, which leads directly to the much larger Terreiro do Fonte ("Terrace of the Fountain"). So named because of the large octagonal water fountain, the terrace is a principal square within the retreat, with bunk seating in rock around its edges. Legend suggests that King Sebastian would eat his meals around this fountain when he visited the convent. The fountain itself shows vestiges of 17th-century azulejo tile.

The plan of the site is irregular, composed of various spaces at different slope heights, incorporated into the local rock and cliffs. The church, integrated into the complex, has a longitudinal plan, with a nave and presbytery in the rock. Its simple facades, with no decoration, are uncommonly utilitarian, with a lack of ostentation typical of the period of its construction. The principal entrance, across the southeastern portal to the elevated Terreiro da Fonte, is made from two steps. The stone patio has vestiges of two tombs, while the roof is covered in cork. In the centre wall, the cut backrests are decorated with pebbles and ceramic fragments, with a conch-like arched niche, decorated with ceramic fragments. On the wall fascia, accessed by stairs on two sides converging onto a level platform, there are two door frames covered with cork, leading to the pilgrims' quarters. Between these is a large wooden cross and inscribed muraria box, framed with pebbles and shells, with traces of a painting depicting a crucified monk. The right-side wall is embossed with a representation of Virgin with the Child and the founder of the convent, D. Álvaro de Castro, topped by a triangular pediment, the tympanum with Christ Pantocrator. On the opposite wall, the lintel is surmounted by a cross of rubble, flanked by two small openings, with access to the Chapel of Senhor dos Passos.

This chapel interior is covered in monochromatic azulejos (blue-on-white tiles), with a rounded niche on the main wall, with panels showing scenes from the Flagellation of Christ and Crowning with Thorns on opposite sides. On the vaulted ceiling, there are also symbols from the Passion, and stars. On the left wall is a relief of the Virgin with Child, framed by a canopy held by angels. On the right wall, surmounted by a cross of shells over a skull and crossbones, is the old entranceway for novices (which represented the transition between the spiritual and terrestrial lives), leading from the Pátio do Tanque ("Patio of the Tank") across a corridor with busts of friars minor. On the left wall, surmounted by a cross of rubble and shells and fragments of ceramics, is an epigraphic inscription and a doorway to the church.

The church interior consists of a small nave, covered with a vaulted ceiling and paved with stone slabs. The walls show remnants of plaster with some exposure to the rock face. On the pulpit side there is a framed inscription, surmounted by a carved stone of the coat of arms of the Castro family (the patrons of the convent). The inscription reads:

D. ALVARO DE CASTRO DO CONS.º DE ESTADO, E VEDOR DA FAZ.ª DEL REY. D. SE / BASTIÃO FVNDOV ESTE CONVENTO POR MANDADO DO VISORY. D. IOAO / DE CASTRO SEV PAY ANNO 1560: O PADROADO HE DOS SVCESSORES DE SVA CASA. / O ALTAR DESTA IGRE.ª HE PRIVELIGIADO TODOS OS DIAS A QVAL QVER SACERDO / TE QVE NELLE CELEBRAR TODAS AS PESSOAS QVE CONTRITAS E CONFESSADAS / OV CÕ PROPOSITO DE SE CONFESSAR, VISITAREM ESTA IGR.ª NA FESTA DA INVE / AÕ. DA S. CRUZ DESDAS PRIMEIRAS VESPORAS ATE O SOL POSTO DO DIA E ROGA / REM A DEOS POLA PAZ ENTRE OS PRINCIPES CHRISTAÕS, EXTIRPAÇÃO DAS HERESIAS EXALTAÇÃO DA. S. MADRE IGR.ª E POLA ALMA DE. D. IOAÕ DE CASTRO GANHAÕ / INDVLG.ª PLEN.ª E REMISSÃO DE SEVS PECCADOS. ESTAS INDVLG.AS CÕCEDEO O PAPA PIO 4º ANNO DE 1564 A INSTÃCIA DO MESMO. D. ALVº DE CASTRO, SENDO EMBAIX.OR E ROMA

"D. Álvaro de Castro of the Council of State and Overseer of State of King D. Sebastian founded this convent by order of the Viceroy D. João de Castro, his father, year 1560: the patron and his successors of his House. The altar of this church is privileged every day by any priest who in it celebrates all contrite and confessed people, or those who propose to confess, who visit this church in the festival of the Holy Cross from the first vespers until sunset on the day and pray to God for peace between the Christian princes, extirpation from the heresies exalted to the Sainted Mother Church and for the soul of D. João de Castero to gain indulgences and remission of his sins. These indulgences were conceded by Pope Pius IV in the year 1564 by request of D. Álvaro de Castro, being Ambassador of Rome"

The presbytery is marked by the vestiges of a wooden balustrade and covered by the rocks that conceal the space. The church walls include fascia inscribed on the rocks and a concave retable in marble, crowned by cornices. The central axis includes three panels: the central panel, including the tabernacle framed by pilasters and flanked by two niches, and the lateral oblique panels, which also have a niche. The main altar, in polychromatic marble front, is designed with organic composition. On the pulpit side, there is a small staircase in rock, with access to the choir, itself covered in cork. The space is illuminated by two small windows, with two bunks of seating, also covered in cork, where the friars participated in masses.

The interior dependencies are aligned along several corridors within the complex and broken by small steps formed by the slopes on which the convent was built. Many of the spaces are covered in cork, which acted as an insulator; many of the doors and windows are covered in cork, while the austere floor is composed of stone slabs. The personal quarters of the friars, eight in total, are small in size with small entrance-ways and access to the main corridor. Friar António da Piedade, writing in 1728, described the cells as so small that a few of the monks carved out portions of the wall in order to accommodate their feet. The refectory included a large slab that was ordered extracted from the mountains by Henry, King of Portugal and used as a table by the monks, and small cupboard. The relatively small space was connected to the kitchen, with stone and chimney, and rock bunks for counters and spaces carved into the rock. The Casa das Águas ("House of the Waters"), accessible through an exterior corridor to a cistern and spring, was the collection and distribution space for water into the convent, and included a water tank, latrines, and urinal. In addition, the complex included a space for novices; an old library with roof covered in cork; an infirmary; hall of penitence; two cells covered in wood; a space for solitude/retreat (located at the highest point in the complex); and the circular Casa do Capítulo, whose access door and walls are decorated in cork, interrupted by a niche.

The Casa do Capítulo fronts the octagonal Patio do Tanque and the Chapel of Santo António (or Senhor do Horto), a rectangular single nave chapel covered in tiles with patio. This main porch, oriented towards the fountain, is accessible by a staircase and includes a painted mural with Saint Francis of Assisi and Saint Anthony. The interior is paved in tiles with remnants of wall murals towards the vaulted ceiling. The fascia, consisting of a false retable, includes a niche carved into the wall, moulded into an arch, over an altar covered in azulejo tile. The azulejos include representations of two angels holdings scrolls, with a central inscription. The Chapel of Senhor Crucificado (or "Chapel of the Ecce Homo"), with rectangular plan, is covered in tiles. Its interior is decorated in murals, with friezes in monochromatic azulejo and elevated central niche on the wall.

In the most elevated zone of the complex is the grotto of Honório de Santa Maria, with an inscription along the path, stating, "HIC. HONORIVS. / VITAM. FINIVIT. ET. IDEO. CVM DEO. / VITAM. REVIVIT / OBIIT ANNO / DE 1596".

The old vegetable gardens, located below the Pátio do Tanque, are accessed from this space or the main portal, while several tanks and water channels criss-cross the spaces from the convent.
