= 4 Hearts =

Portuguese film directed by Manuel Mozos

- Film poster
- Directed by: Manuel Mozos
- Starring: Rita Martins; Filipe Duarte; João Lagarto; Margarida Marinho; Diana Costa e Silva
- Production company: Rosa Filmes
- Release date: November 2008 (Estoril Film Festival)
- Country: Portugal
- Language: Portuguese

4 Hearts (Portuguese: 4 Copas) is a Portuguese film directed by Manuel Mozos, released in 2009 and produced by Rosa Filmes. The cast features Rita Martins, Filipe Duarte, João Lagarto, Margarida Marinho and Diana Costa e Silva.

== Plot ==
As a teenager, Diana is looking for true love and uses her father and her stepmother as an ideal example. That is, until she finds that her stepmother is having an affair. While trying to separate her stepmother from her lover, Diana learns more than she bargained for about herself.
