= Ramiro (film) =

Ramiro is a 2017 tragicomic feature film by Portuguese director Manuel Mozos.

== Plot ==
Ramiro is a bookseller and a struggling writer in Lisbon. He is frustrated by his persistent writer's block and his small life, but he is basically settled amid his small used bookstore, his weekly book stall at Lisbon's Feira da Ladra flea market, his friends in the corner bar, and his neighbors. His dog accompanies him, his loyal friend Patrícia looks after him, he drinks and argues with his friends, and he talks to his young neighbor, the pregnant orphan Daniela, and to her grandmother Amélia, who is recovering from a stroke.

Basically, Ramiro would like to continue his quiet life in his microcosm undisturbed, but he is increasingly being disturbed. First, Grandma Amélia asks him to visit a man named Alfredo in prison who killed his wife. He visits him and learns that he is Daniela's father. Now he is trying to find out more about the case.

Then a publisher friend pressures him to write contributions to an anthology, but Ramiro continues to feel blocked and now additionally stressed and only reluctantly and non-bindingly agrees.

He is also approached by Daniela's teacher who wants to talk to him about Daniela as a young pregnant woman. After he tells her that he is not her father, but a bookseller and that Daniela is an orphan and that he is just a neighbor and close friend of the family, she approaches him cautiously.

Things now get further into disarray: Alfredo comes out of prison, stays with Ramiro and wants to tell his daughter everything, but doesn't. One of Ramiro's old friends dies unexpectedly, his dog suddenly becomes more attached to Grandma Amélia than to Ramiro, and his local bar closes. Two petty criminals rob him on his way home one evening, beating him up and taking away his bag with his manuscript. Because of all this, his mood continues to sink and he becomes unfriendly to his girlfriend and Daniela and now also has a falling out with his friend, who used to help him every day in the bookstore and keep him company. Finally his dog dies too. He just wants peace and quiet, but life is now taking him prisoner with all its ups and downs.

When Daniela has her child, Ramiro's entire entourage meets in the hospital, and he reconciles with everyone without any words spoken. In the evenings he sleeps through a literary program in front of the television in which people remember him and praise his work, waiting for something new. The next day he discovers his bag and his manuscript at the flea market, which he buys back for one euro.

== Production ==
The film was shot in Lisbon from May to June 2016 and was produced by the film production company O Som ea Fúria, with financial support from the film funding agency ICA ( Instituto do Cinema e do Audiovisual ), the public television station RTP and the Lisbon city administration.

In addition to the film music by Bruno Pernadas (composition: Closed Closet), the film also includes the introit to the Requiem in D minor (K. 626) by Wolfgang Amadeus Mozart, the song Paixão by the avant-garde pop group Heróis do Mar and the piece Peste & Sida Listen to punk band Peste & Sida.

== Reception ==
The quiet film, characterized by quiet humor and tragicomic undertones, celebrated its premiere on October 19, 2017 in the large auditorium of the Cultural Foundation Culturgest at the opening of the 15th Doclisboa Film Festival. It then screened at several other international film festivals, including the Viennale (on October 26, 2017) and the Mar del Plata Festival (November 18, 2017). It was nominated for several film awards, including an acting award from the Sociedade Portuguesa de Autores (SPA) and best film (and best actor) at the 2019 Globos de Ouro.

It was released in theaters on March 1, 2018 in only 6 cinemas in the Portugal (3 × Greater Lisbon, 2 × Greater Porto and 1 × Coimbra), where it received 2,453 admissions.

Ramiro was released on DVD by Alambique in Portugal in 2018, with the short film A Glória de Fazer Cinema em Portugal by Manuel Mozos as bonus material.

It aired for the first time on Portuguese television on December 26, 2021, on the public channel RTP2, where it was repeated on May 21, 2022.
