= What's New About Love? =

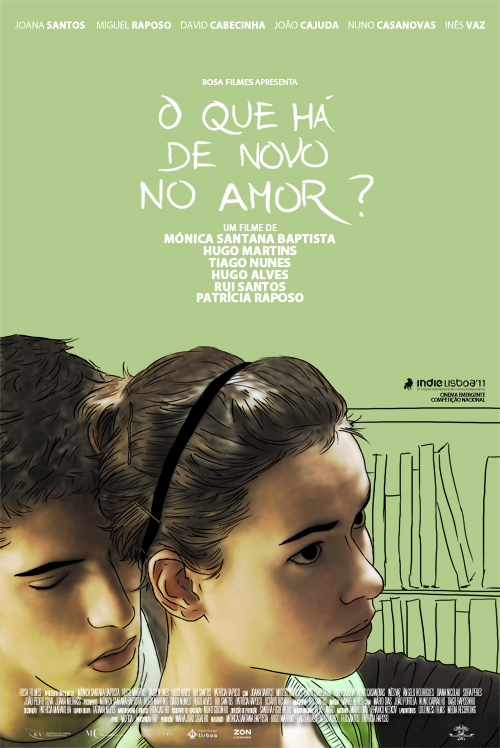
- Directed by: Mónica Santana Baptista; Hugo Martins; Tiago Nunes; Hugo Alves; Rui Santos; Patrícia Raposo
- Screenplay by: Mónica Santana Baptista; Hugo Martins; Tiago Nunes; Hugo Alves; Rui Santos; Patrícia Raposo; Octávio Rosado
- Produced by: Maria João Sigalho
- Starring: Joana Santos; Miguel Raposo; David Cabecinha; João Cajuda; Nuno Casanovas; Inês Vaz
- Cinematography: Daniel Neves
- Edited by: Rui Santos
- Music by: Peixe:Avião; Os Golpes; Os Velhos; Samuel Úria
- Production company: Rosa Filmes
- Release date: May 12, 2011 (IndieLisboa)
- Running time: 124 minutes
- Country: Portugal
- Language: Portuguese
- Budget: €500 hundred [???]

What's New About Love? (Portuguese:O Que Há De Novo No Amor?) is a 2011 Portuguese anthology film, consisting of six short films, directed by Mónica Santana Baptista, Hugo Martins, Tiago Nunes, Hugo Alves, Rui Santos and Patrícia Raposo, produced by Rosa Filmes.

== Synopsis ==
Six friends meet every evening in a basement to make music. During the daytime, however, there are no rehearsals for what life brings us. Each endeavour leaves its mark...

=== "João" ===
- Written and directed by Tiago Nunes

João lacks the courage to breakup with his girlfriend and takes refuge in the song he is writing for Inês.

=== "Rita" ===
- Written and directed by Mónica Santana Baptista

Rita left Ricardo, Rafael found her, but she still feels lost...

=== "Eduardo" ===
- Written and directed by Hugo Martins

Eduardo thought he no longer liked Maria, but after what he has done he cannot turn the clock back.

=== "Marco" ===
- Written and directed by Hugo Alves

Marco struggles to get another young man’s love, but he is under no illusions.

=== "Samuel" ===
- Written and directed by Rui Santos

Samuel believes in everlasting love but something is wrong because his friends haven’t heard from him for sometime.

=== "Inês" ===
- Written and directed by Patrícia Raposo

Inês, attempting to feel safe, likes to experiment and she's waiting to see how things go with João.

== Cast ==
- Joana Santos as Rita
- Miguel Raposo as Edu
- David Cabecinha as João
- João Cajuda as Marco
- Nuno Casanovas as Samuel
- Inês Vaz as Inês
- Ângelo Rodrigues as Rafael
- Diana Nicolau as Maria
- Sofia Peres as Lígia
- João Pedro Silva as Tiago
- Joana Metrass as Vera
- Raquel André as Sofia
- Sónia Balacó as Bárbara

== Soundtrack ==
Includes songs by the alternative Portuguese rock bands Os Golpes and Os Velhos, both from the independent record label Amor Fúria, as well as songs by the American band The Walkmen. The original score was composed and performed by the indie Portuguese band Peixe:Avião, besides some songs composed by Hugo Alves, one of the directors. The singer-songwriter Samuel Úria performs in the film, playing two of his songs: Barbarella e Barba Rala and Não Arrastes o Meu Caixão.

== Reception ==
What's New About Love? was awarded the TAP prize for the best Portuguese feature film at the 2011 edition of the IndieLisboa film festival. The film had its international premiere as part of the official selection of the 19th Raindance Film Festival in London. The film had its South American premiere at the São Paulo International Film Festival, and was also present in other Portuguese-language festivals, like the Santa Maria da Feira Luso-Brazilian Film Festival and the Toronto Portuguese Film Festival.
