= Manuela Viegas =

Portuguese film editor and director (born 1958)

- Born: 13 October 1958 (age 66); Porto, Portugal
- Occupation(s): Film director, film editor, film writer

Manuela Viegas (born 13 October 1958) is a Portuguese film editor and director. She is considered to be part of The School of Reis film tradition.

An influential film editor since the 1970s, she has edited dozens of films, among them Pedro Costa's Blood, Joaquim Sapinho's The Policewoman and João César Monteiro's Silvestre and À Flor do Mar. In 1999, she directed her first and only feature film to date, Gloria, which was part of the official competition at the 49th Berlin International Film Festival. It was the only Portuguese film to feature until Tabu was selected in 2012.

She is currently a professor of film editing at the Portuguese National Film School.
