= Sintra Mountains =

Mountain range in Western Portugal

Coordinates: 38°47′14″N 9°23′30″W

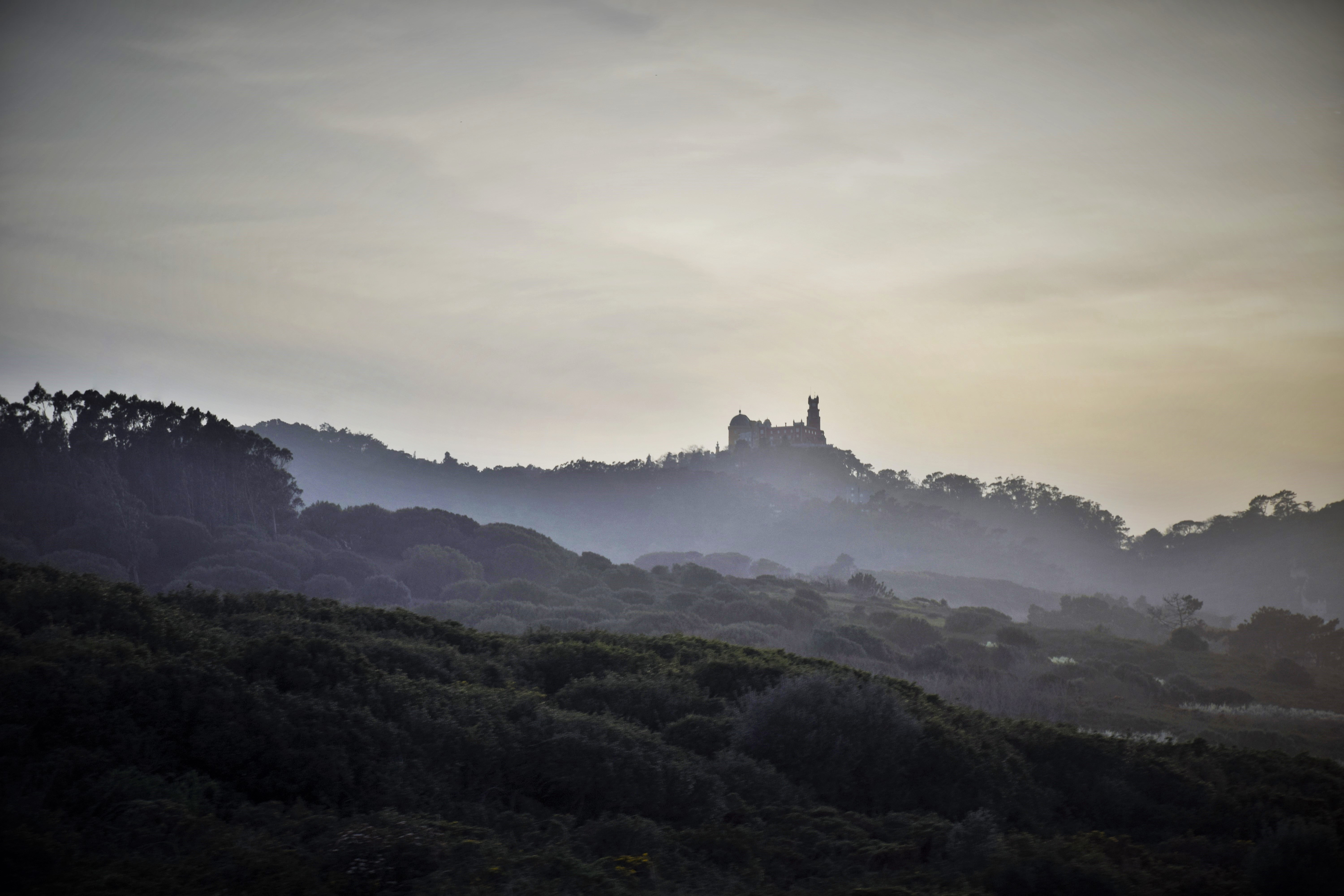
Landscape of the Sintra Mountains (Serra de Sintra). The Pena Palace, which is visible in the image, is close to the peak of the mountain, named Cruz Alta (high Cross).

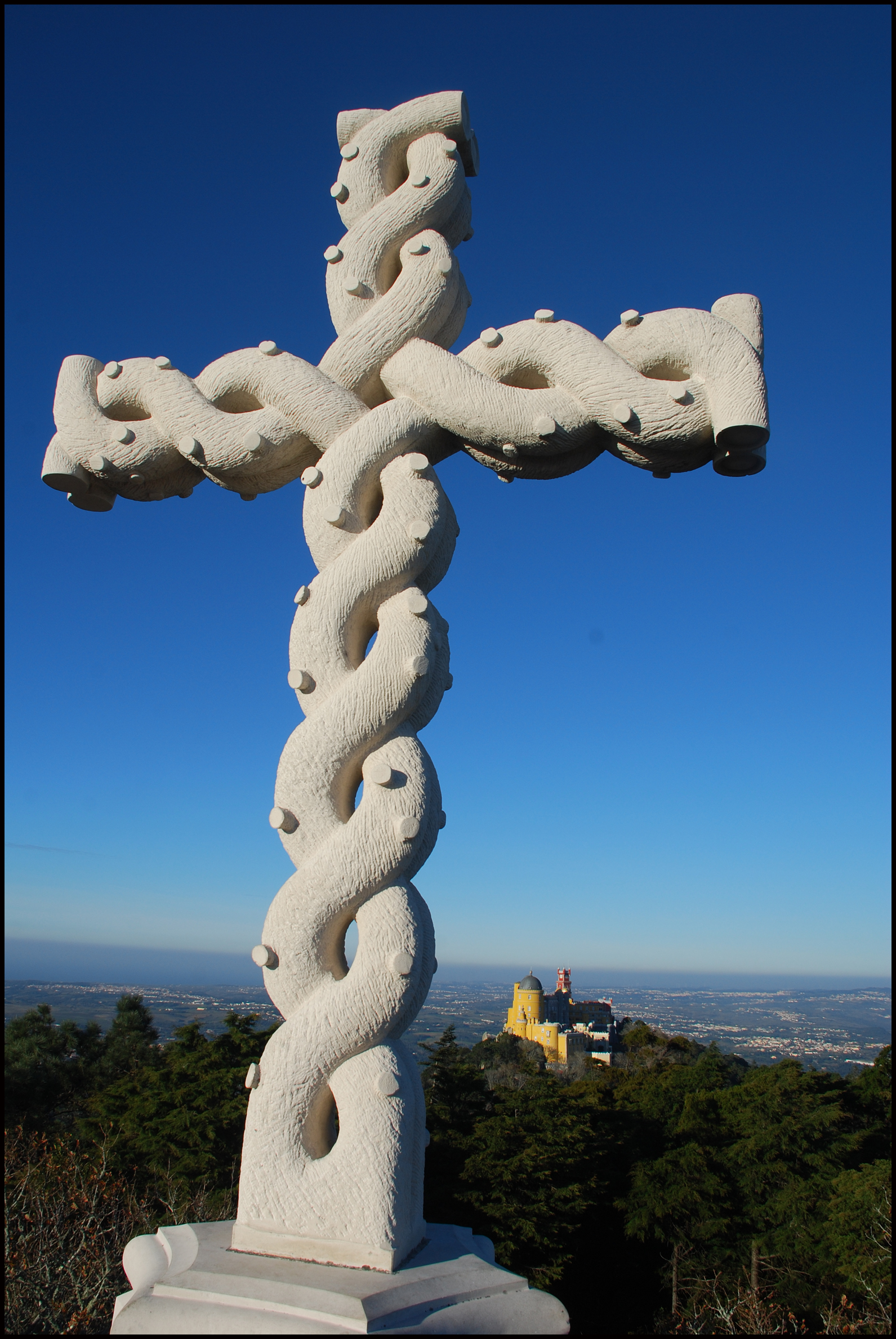
Cruz Alta (high Cross), the summit cross marking the highest point of Sintra Mountains (529 m).

The Sintra Mountains (Portuguese: Serra de Sintra), is a mountain range in western Portugal. Its highest point is at 529 meters (1,736 ft) near Sintra. The range covers about 16 kilometers (10 mi) from the resort town of Sintra to Cabo da Roca (Cape Roca) on the Atlantic Ocean. It was known to the Ancient World as Lunae Mons (mountain of the Moon) and was the legendary retreat of Diana the Huntress (known as Cynthia to the Romans, from the Greek Κύνθια, hence Çintra).

It has a rich fauna, foxes, genet, moles, salamanders, peregrine falcons, vipers and various species of scaly reptiles. Its climate is temperate with many oceanic influences and has a higher rainfall than the remaining area of Lisbon. It also has unique vegetation. About nine hundred plant species are indigenous, ten percent of which are endemic. Namely oak, cork oak and pine wood.

It is the target of several sightseeing tours. It is also visited by climbing and mountaineering practitioners, because the slopes are mostly oriented to the west, which increases the length of light in the afternoon.

In it are located: the Moorish Castle, the Pena Palace, the Capuchin Convent, the Sintra National Palace, the Palace of Monserrate and the Quinta da Regaleira.

For a long time it has been a place full of myths and legends about supernatural activities and ones without obvious explanation. In 2009 a Portuguese television channel created a television series, Lua Vermelha, based on the supernatural environment that lived in Sintra. The story, set in a college in the middle of the mountain tells of an impossible love between a vampire and a human girl, but she also had supernatural powers, discovered throughout the episodes.
