= Manuel Mozos =

Portuguese film director (born 1959)

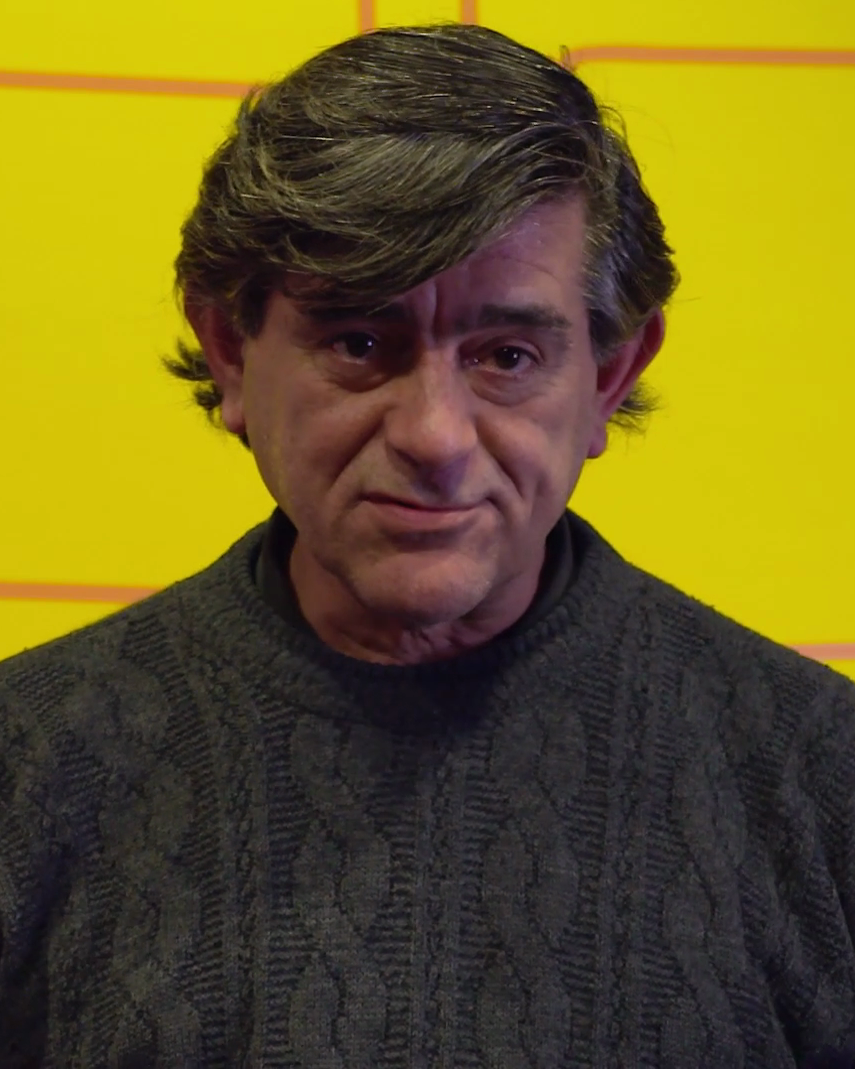
- Manuel Mozos in 2018
- Born: Manuel Mozos; June 6, 1959 (age 67); Lisbon, Portugal
- Education: School of Theatre and Cinema
- Occupations: Film director, screenwriter, film editor
- Years active: 1985-presents

Manuel Mozos (born June 1959, in Lisbon) is a Portuguese film director.

== Biography ==
Mozos studied history and philosophy before enrolling at the School of Theatre and Cinema, where he specialized as an editor. He was responsible for the editing of several films, and in 1989, he directed Um Passo, Outro Passo e Depois... In 1992, he directed his first feature, Xavier. Since then he has also directed several documentaries and video clips, including 4 Hearts, produced and released by Rosa Filmes.

== Filmography2017 - Ramiro ==
- 2026 - A Few Things Happening by a River
- 2009 - 4 Copas
- 2009 - Ruínas
- 2007 - Diana
- 2000 - Crescei e Multiplicai-vos
- 1999 - Censura: Alguns Cortes
- 1999 - ...Quando Troveja
- 1998 - José Cardoso Pires - Diário de Bordo
- 1997 - Cinema Português?
- 1996 - Solitarium
- 1992 - Xavier
- 1989 - Um Passo, Outro Passo e Depois...
