= List of museums in Portugal =

This is a list of museums in Portugal.

== Aveiro ==
- Aveiro City Museum
- Casinha de Bonecas
- Fábrica Centro Ciência Viva de Aveiro
- Museu de Arte Nova
- Visionarium (Portugal)

== Braga ==
- Biscainhos Museum
- Braga Cathedral Treasure
- D. Diogo de Sousa Museum
- Image Museum
- Museu da Cultura Castreja
- Museu do Traje Dr. Gonçalo Sampaio
- Museum Medina
- Nogueira da Silva Museum
- Pius XII Museum
- Stringed Instruments Museum
- Alberto Sampaio Museum

== Coimbra ==
- Academic Prison
- Casa Museu Fernando Namora
- Conímbriga
- Erotic Art Museum of Coimbra
- Exploratory - Living Science Center of Coimbra
- Monastery of Santa Clara-a-Velha
- Museo de Coimbra
- Museu dos Transportes Urbanos de Coimbra
- Museo del Agua
- Museu da Santa Casa da Misericórdia de Coimbra
- National Museum Machado de Castro
- Science Museum of the University of Coimbra

== Guimarães ==
- Casa da Memória de Guimarães
- Centro Internacional das Artes José de Guimarães

== Lagos ==
- Centro Ciência Viva de Lagos
- Mercado de Escravos
- Museu Municipal Dr. José Formosinho
- Núcleo Museológico Rota da Escravatura

== Leiria ==
- Banco das Artes Galeria
- Moinho do Papel
- Museu de Cerâmica (Caldas da Rainha)
- Museu Escolar
- Museu da Imagem em Movimento
- Museo de Leiría
- Museu do Sporting
- José Malhoa Museum

== Lisbon and Lisbon District ==
=== Cascais ===
- Casa das Histórias Paula Rego
- Casa de Santa Maria
- Casa Sommer
- Cascais Citadel Palace Museum
- Condes de Castro Guimarães Museum
- Museum of Portuguese Music (Estoril)
- Museum of the Sea, Cascais
- Palácio da Cidadela
- Palácio dos Condes da Guarda, Cascais
- Santa Marta Lighthouse (Cascais) (and lighthouse museum)

=== Lisbon ===
- Ajuda National Palace
- Archaeological Museum of São Miguel de Odrinhas
- Astronomical Observatory of Lisbon
- Atelier-Museu Júlio Pomar
- Beau-Séjour Palace
- Berardo - Art Deco Museum
- Berardo Collection Museum
- Cadeia do Aljube
- Carris Museum
- Casa-Museu Dr. Anastácio Gonçalves
- Casa-Museu Medeiros e Almeida
- Calouste Gulbenkian Museum
- Carmo Convent (Lisbon)
- Casa dos Bicos
- Centro de Apoio Social de Runa
- Chiado Museum
- Cordoaria Nacional
- Electricity Museum (Lisbon) (since 2016 part of MAAT)
- Ephemeral Museum
- Fado Museum
- Fort of Bom Sucesso
- House Museum - Fundação Amália Rodrigues
- Lisbon Army Museum
- Macau Science and Culture Centre
- Money Museum
- Museum of Art, Architecture and Technology (former Electricity Museum)
- Museu de Arte Popular
- Museu Benfica
- Museu da Comunicação
- Museu da Guarda Nacional Republicana
- Museu da Lourinhã
- Museu da Marioneta
- Museum of Portuguese Decorative Arts
- Museum of the Presidency of the Republic
- Museum of Saint Anthony
- Museu de São Roque
- National Museum of Ancient Art
- National Archaeology Museum (Lisbon)
- National Coach Museum
- National Museum of the Azulejo
- National Museum of Contemporary Art
- National Museum of Costume
- National Museum of Ethnology
- National Music Museum
- National Museum of Natural History and Science, Lisbon
- National Railway Museum
- National Theatre and Dance Museum
- National Museum Soares dos Reis
- Navy Museum
- Museum of the Orient
- Palace of the Marquesses of Fronteira
- Pavilhão do Conhecimento
- Pharmacy Museum
- Pimenta Palace
- Rafael Bordalo Pinheiro Museum
- Teatro Romano de Lisboa
- Tejo Power Station

=== Sacavém ===
- Casa Museu José Pedro
- Ceramics Museum of Sacavém

=== Sintra ===
- Museu Anjos Teixeira
- Museu De Arte Moderna
- Museu do Ar
- Ferreira de Castro Museum
- NewsMuseum
- Sintra Natural History Museum

== Marinha Grande ==
- Casa Museu Afonso Lopes Vieira
- Glass Museum of Marinha Grande (Portugal)
- Joaquim Correia Museum
- SB Museum of Glass Manufacturing

== Porto ==
=== Amarante ===
- Museu Municipal Amadeo de Souza Cardoso
- Museu Paroquial de Arte Sacra de S. Gonçalo de Amarante
- Sala-Museu do Rancho Folclórico da Casa do Povo de Figueiró

=== Baião ===
- Museu Etnográfico de Baião
- Museu Municipal de Arqueologia de Baião
- Museu Queiroziano - Casa de Tormes

=== Felgueiras ===
- Museu da Casa do Assento
- Museu de Pão de LO
- Santa Quitéria

=== Gondomar ===
- Casa da Malta/Museu Mineiro – Fânzeres e São Pedro da Cova
- Museu de Arte Sacra da Paróquia de S. Cosme

=== Maia ===
- Museu da Cidade da Maia
- Museu de História e Etnologia da Terra da Maia – Castelo da Maia (Maia)

=== Marco de Canaveses ===
- Museu Municipal Carmen Miranda

=== Matosinhos ===
- Casa-Museu Abel Salazar
- Casa-Museu Mártir São Sebastião
- Museu da Misericórdia
- Museu da Quinta de Santiago / Centro de Arte de Matosinhos
- Museu de Jazigos Minerais Portugueses do IGM – São Mamede de Infesta (Matosinhos)

=== Lousada ===
- Museu Vivo doo Linho – Lousada

=== Paços de Ferreira ===
- Museu Arqueológico da Citânia de Sanfins – Sanfins
- Museu do Móvel

=== Porto ===
- Arqueossítio D. Hugo n.º 5 — Sé (Porto)
- Bank of Materials
- Casa de Serralves — Fundação de Serralves (Lordelo do Ouro)
- Casa do Infante — Núcleo Museológico do Museu do Porto (São Nicolau (Porto))
- Casa Museu Fernando de Castro — (Paranhos (Porto))
- Casa-Museu Guerra Junqueiro — Casa do Dr. Domingos Barbosa (Sé (Porto))
- Casa-Museu Marta Ortigão Sampaio — Cedofeita
- Casa Oficina António Carneiro — (Bonfim)
- Centro Interpretativo do Património da Afurada
- Eng. António de Almeida House Museum — (Ramalde)
- FC Porto Museum
- Fundação Maria Isabel Guerra Junqueiro e Luís Pinto Mesquita Carvalho — Casa dos Freires de Andrade (Sé (Porto))
- Numismatics Cabinet
- Holocaust Museum of Porto
- House of Almeida Garrett
- House of Filigree
- Medical Museum of Human Anatomy
- Museu de Arte Contemporânea de Serralves
- Museu do Centro Hospitalar do Porto
- Museu da Farmácia — (Ramalde)
- Museum of Industry — (Ramalde)
- Museum Marionetas do Porto
- Museu da Venerável Ordem Terceira de São Francisco — Igreja da Venerável Ordem Terceira de São Francisco (São Nicolau)
- Museu de Etnologia do Porto — Palácio de São João Novo (Miragaia)
- Museum of Misericórdia of Porto
- Museum of Natural History (University of Porto) — Reitoria da Universidade do Porto (Vitória)
- Museu do Papel Moeda — Fundação Dr. António Cupertino de Miranda (Aldoar)
- Museum of Transport and Communication — Alfandega Nova (Miragaia)
- Museu Militar do Porto — (Bonfim)
- National Press Museum — (Campanhã)
- Palácio das Artes
- Palacete Ramos Pinto
- Portuguese Centre of Photography — Cadeia da Relação (Vitória)
- Museum of the School of Engineering (ISEP) — Instituto Superior de Engenharia (Paranhos)
- Porto Tram Museum — (Massarelos)
- Port Wine Museum — Núcleo Museológico do Museu do Porto (Massarelos)
- Puppet Museum
- Romantic Museum of Quinta da Macieirinha — Núcleo Museológico do Museu do Porto (Massarelos)
- Sacred Art and Archaeology Museum — Convento dos Grilos (São Nicolau)
- Soares dos Reis National Museum — Palácio dos Carrancas (Miragaia)
- Tesouro da Sé — Sé do Porto (Sé)
- World of Discoveries - Miragaia (Porto)
- WOW Porto - The World of Wine

=== Póvoa de Varzim ===
- A Filantrópica – Póvoa de Varzim
- Ethnography and History Museum of Póvoa de Varzim – Póvoa de Varzim
- Santa Casa Museum of Póvoa de Varzim

=== Santo Tirso ===
- Museu de Arte Sacra de Santo Tirso - Santo Tirso
- Museu Internacional de Escultura Contemporânea - Santo Tirso
- Museu Municipal Abade Pedrosa - Santo Tirso

=== Trofa ===
- Museu do Automóvel Antigo de Baptista Andrade – Trofa

=== Valongo ===
- Museu da Ardósia – Valongo

=== Vila Nova de Gaia ===
- Casa-Museu Teixeira Lopes / Galerias Diogo de Macedo – Vila Nova de Gaia
- Museu das Pescas da Estação Litoral da Aguda – Vila Nova de Gaia
- Museu de Ervamoira – Vila Nova de Gaia
- Museu de Santa Maria Adelaide – Vila Nova de Gaia
- Museu do Granito – Vila Nova de Gaia
- Museu do Regimento de Artilharia da Serra do Pilar – Vila Nova de Gaia
- Museu Sandeman do Vinho do Porto – Vila Nova de Gaia
- Solar Condes de Resende – Vila Nova de Gaia

== Santarém ==
- Wax Museum of Fátima – Fátima
- Museum of the Life of Christ – Fátima
- Museum of Sacred Art and Ethnology – Fátima

== Setúbal ==
- Dom Fernando II e Glória
- Monastery of Jesus of Setúbal

== Viana do Castelo ==
- Cinema Museum of Melgaço
- Geraz do Lima Carriage Museum

== Vila Real ==
- House of the County

== Viseu ==
- Grão Vasco Museum

== See also ==
- List of museums
- Tourism in Portugal
- Culture of Portugal
