= Vicent =

Vicent is both a surname and a given name. Notable people with the name include:

Surname

- Francesc Vicent (1450 – c. 1512), Spanish chess player
- Francesc Vicent Garcia (1582–1623), Catalan poet
- Josep Vicent (born 1970), Spanish music director and conductor
- Tania Vicent (born 1976), Canadian speed skater

Given name

- Vicent Partal (born 1960), Spanish journalist and writer
- Vicent Peris (1478–1522), Spanish rebel

== See also ==
- 78071 Vicent, main-belt asteroid
- Casa Vicent, historic house in Porto, Portugal
- Cala de Sant Vicent, holiday resort on Ibiza
