= National Museum of the Azulejo =

Museum in Lisbon, Portugal

National Tile Museum
- Museu Nacional do Azulejo
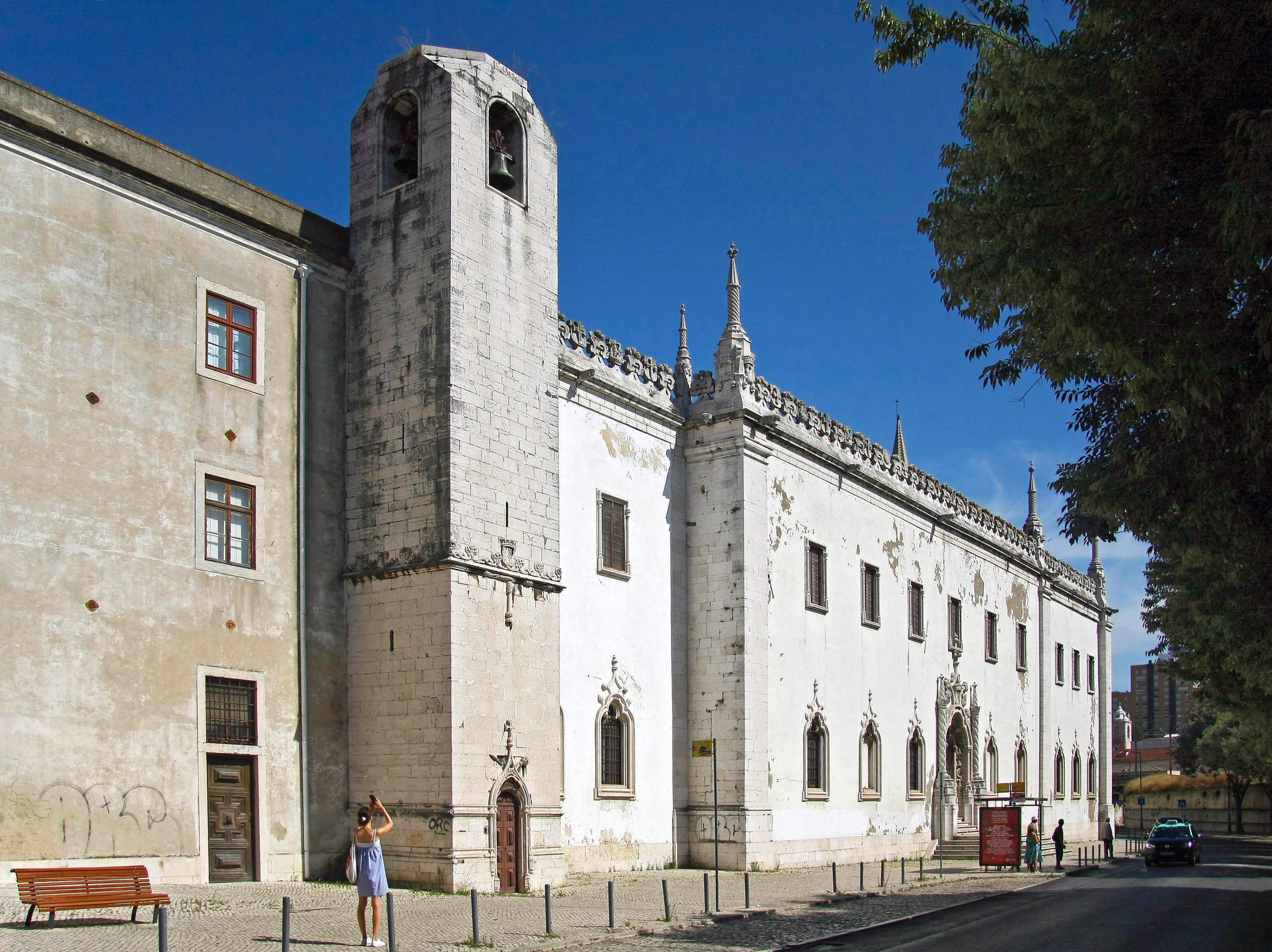
- Established: 1965
- Location: Rua da Madre de Deus, 4, 1900-312 Lisboa, Portugal
- Coordinates: 38°43′28″N 9°06′50″W
- Director: Maria Antónia Pinto de Matos
- Website: www.museudoazulejo.gov.pt

The Museu Nacional do Azulejo (Portuguese for National Museum of the Azulejo), occasionally known in English as the National Tile Museum, is an art museum in Lisbon, Portugal dedicated to the azulejo, traditional tilework of Portugal and the former Portuguese Empire, as well as of other Iberophone cultures. Housed in the former Madre de Deus Convent, the museum's collection is one of the largest of ceramics in the world.

== History ==
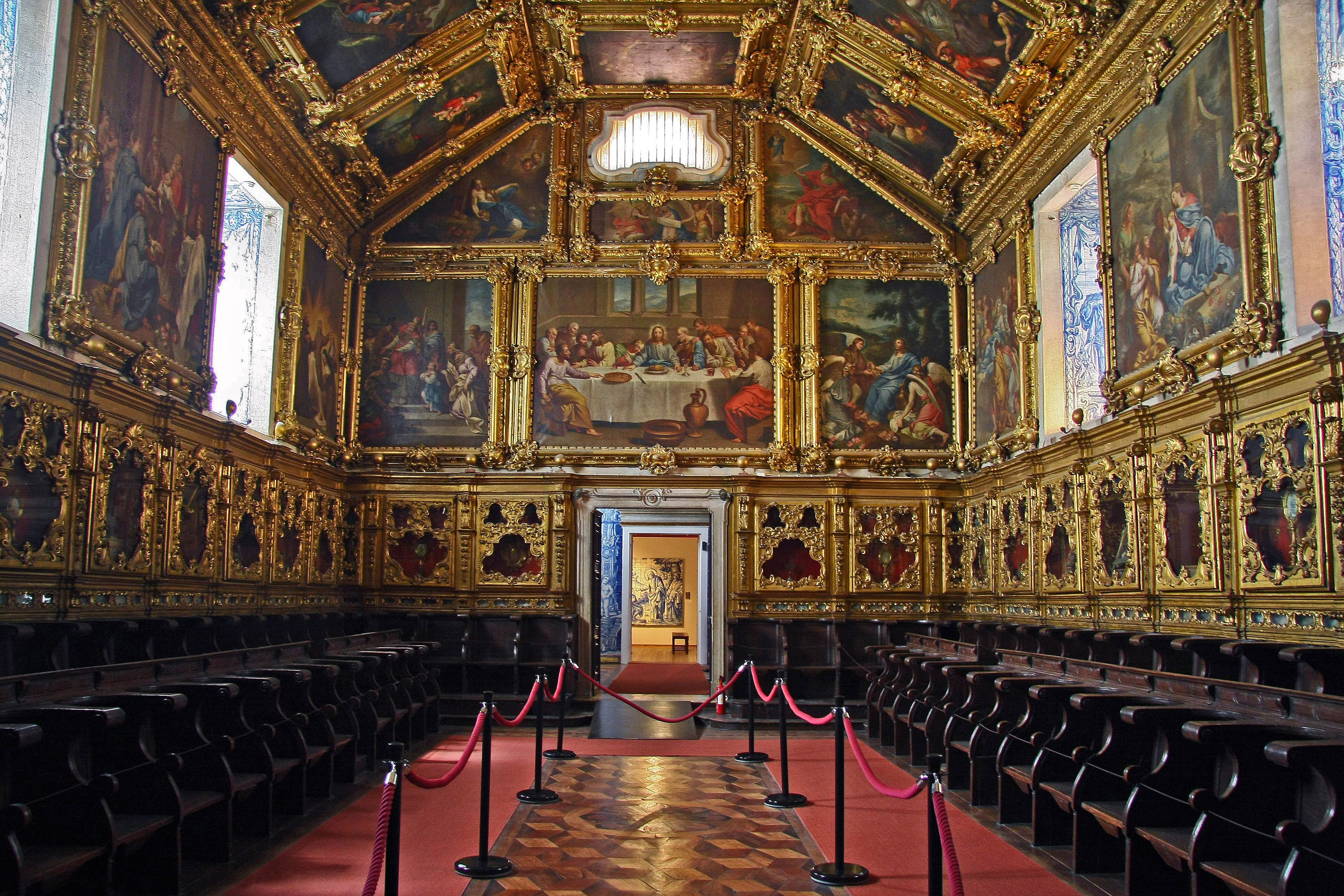
The Portuguese Renaissance choir of Madre de Deus Convent.

The National Tile Museum was established in 1965 and became a National Museum in 1980. It is located in the former Convent of Madre Deus, founded by Queen D. Leonor in 1509. The Museum went through different building campaigns that involved transformations such as in its 16th-century mannerist cloister; the church which is decorated with remarkable sets of paintings and tiles; the sacristy featuring a Brazilian wood display cabinet and carved wood frames with paintings; the high choir with rich carved gilt wood embellishments; the Chapel of Saint Anthony with an 18th-century Baroque decoration and a significant number of canvases by the painter André Gonçalves.

== Collection ==
The museum collection features decorative ceramic tiles or azulejos from the second half of the 15th century to the present day. Besides tiles, it includes ceramics, porcelain and faience from the 19th to the 20th century. Its permanent exhibition starts with a display of the materials and techniques used for manufacturing tiles. After this the exhibition route follows a chronological order.

=== Permanent exhibition ===
The permanent exhibition of the museum is displayed in the rooms of ancient monastery and shows the history of tile heritage in Portugal from 16th century until the modern times. The church, the chapels of Saint Anthony and Queen Leonor, and the choir are parts of this exhibition as well.

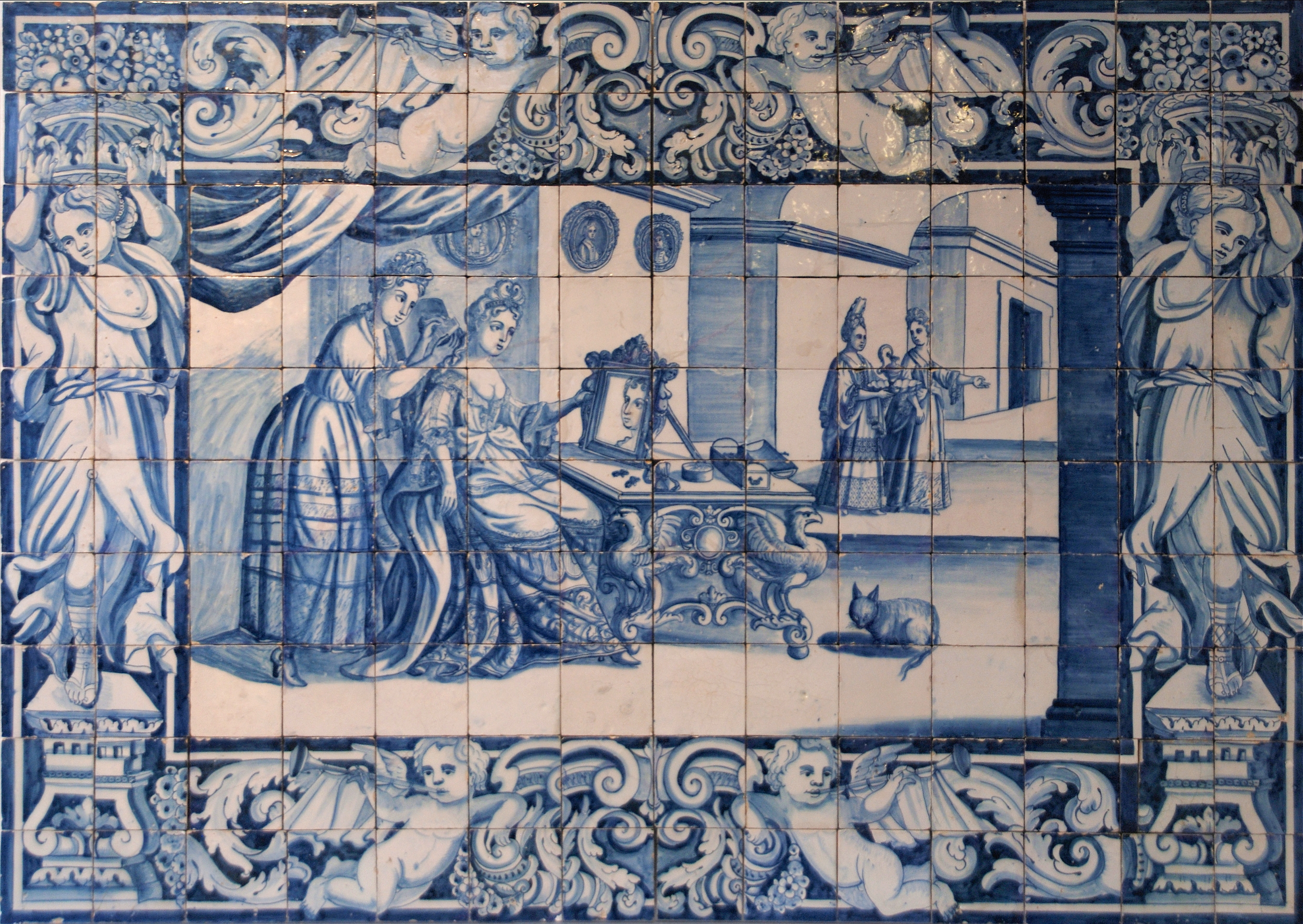
17th century panel.

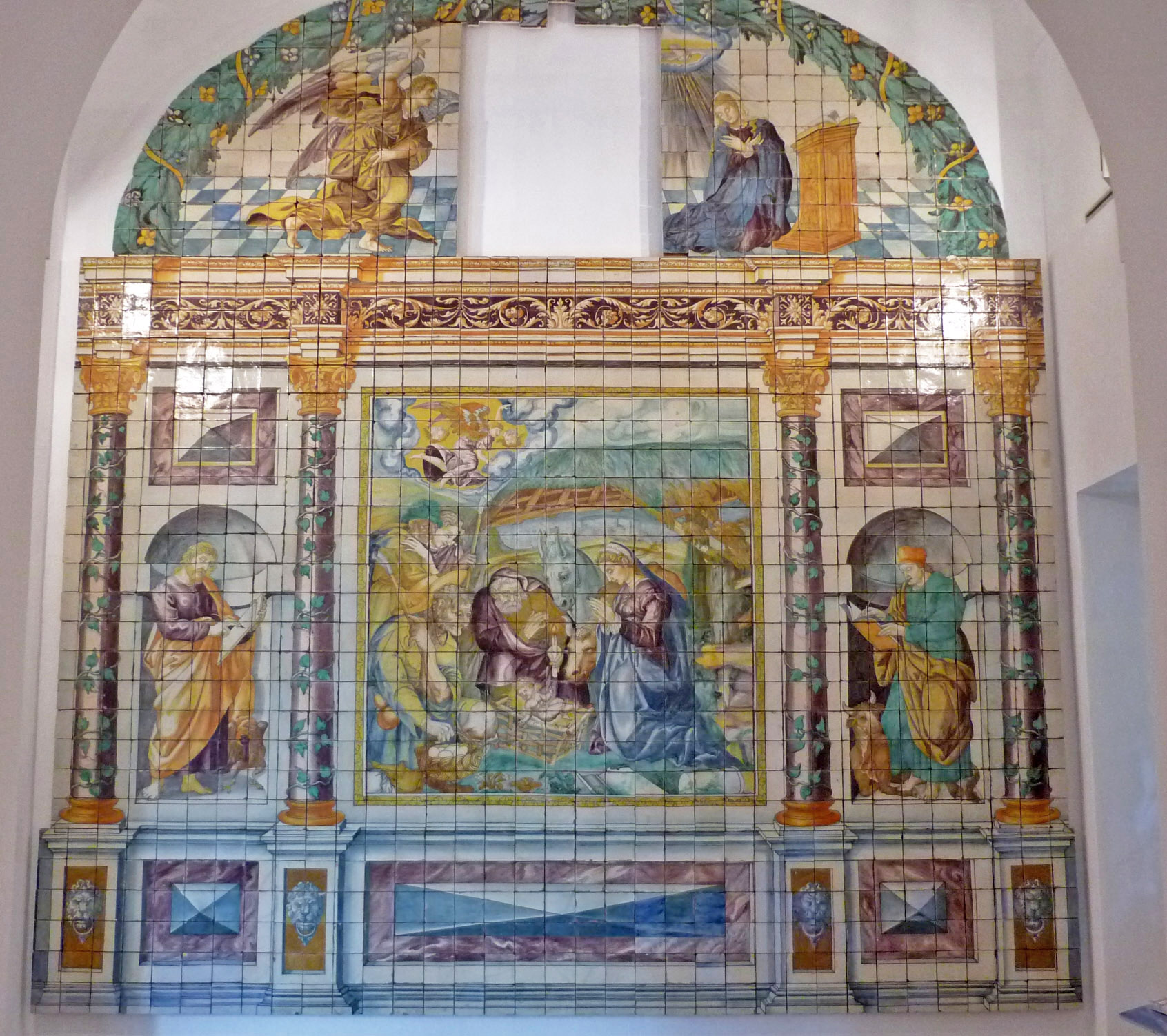
Nossa Senhora da Vida retabule; 16th century.

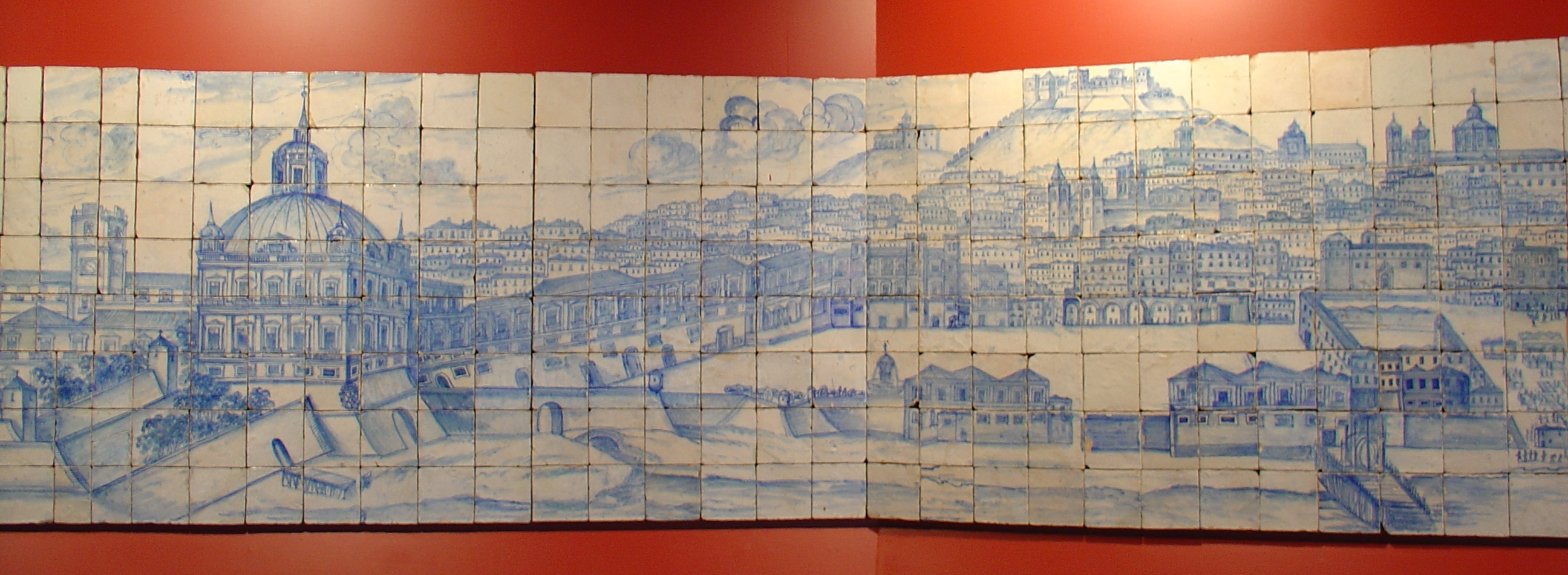
Great View of Lisbon; c. 1700.

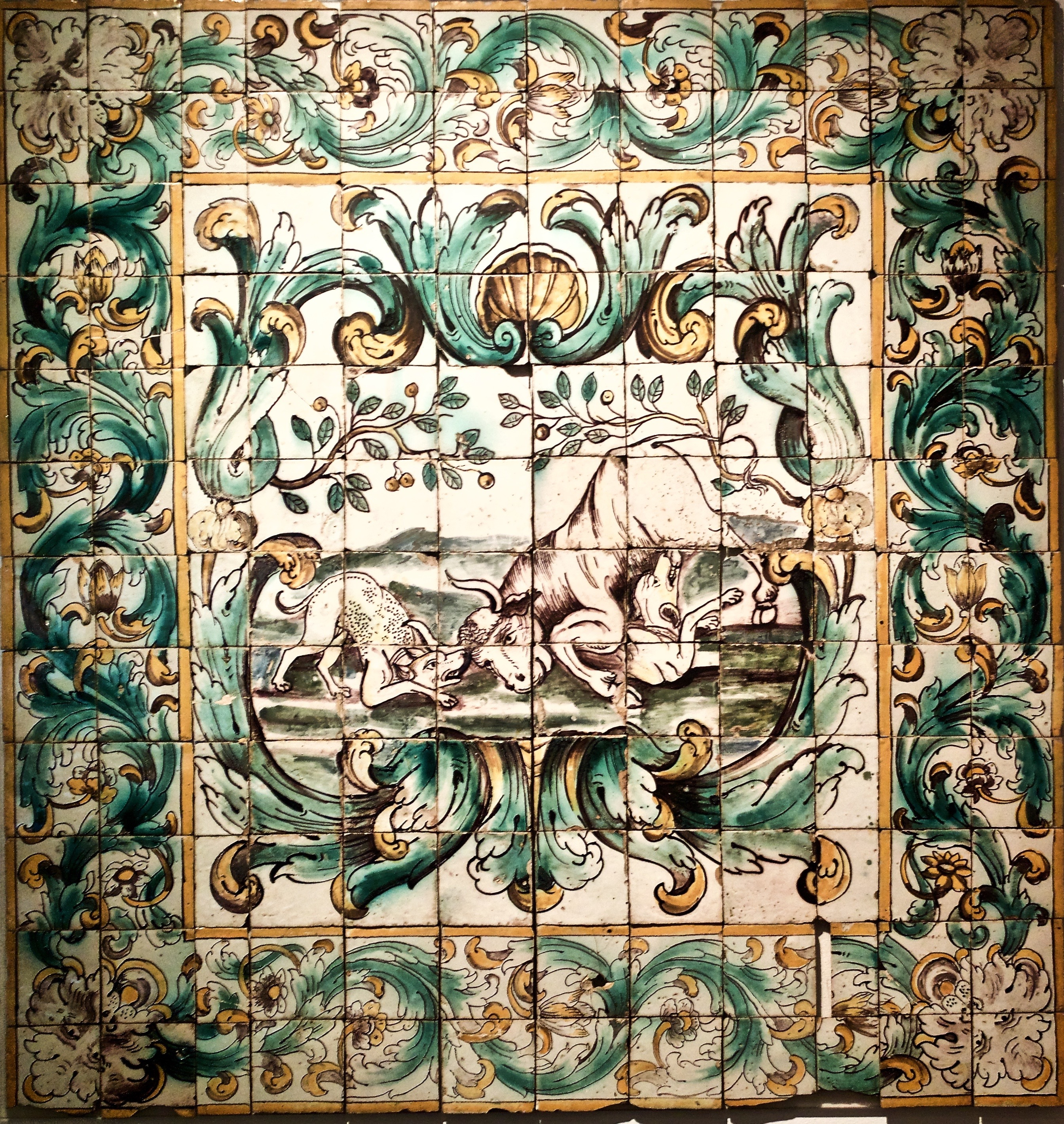
The Hunting Room; 1680.

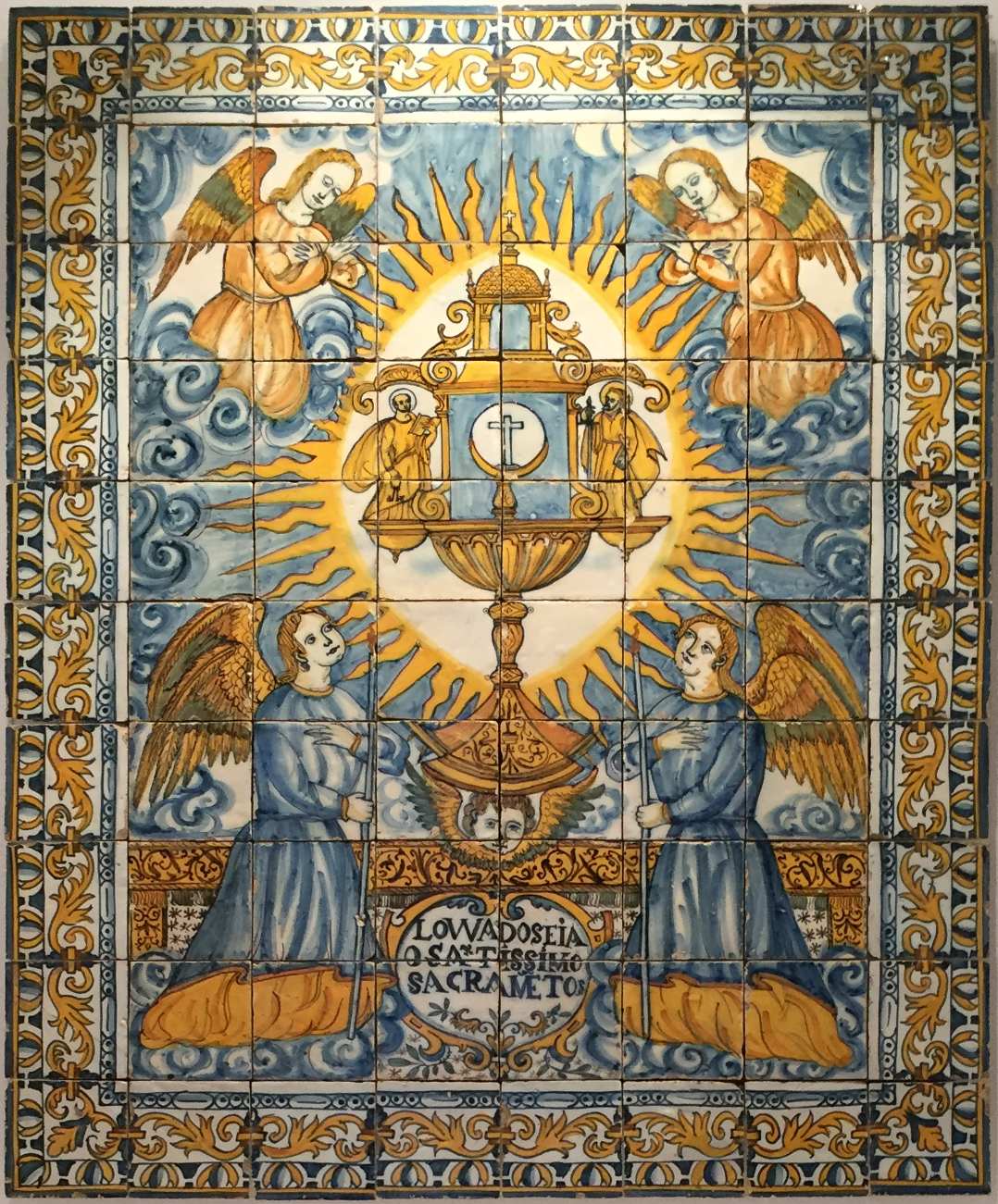
Eucharistic Allegory; c. 1660.

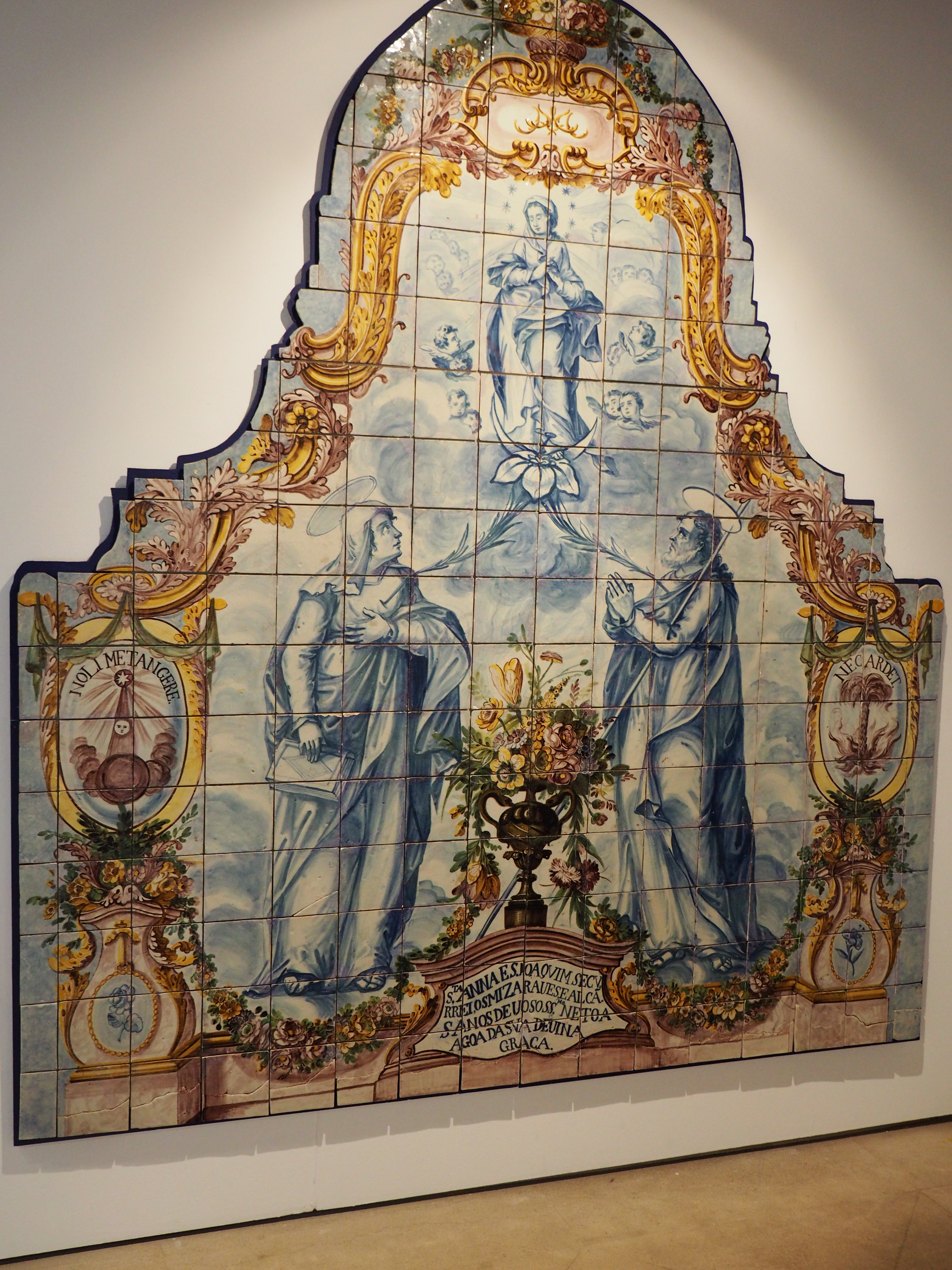
18th century panel.

=== Temporary exhibitions ===
A number of exhibitions are displayed in the museum for a certain period, as "The Art of Tiles in Portugal" in 2000, "Ana Vilela tells her stories about tiles" in 2008, "Me and the Museum" in 2016,"From the Shadows of Kyoto to the Light of Lisbon" in 2017.

== See also ==
- Madre de Deus Convent
- List of museums in Portugal
