= The Engagement of St Ursula and Prince Etherius =

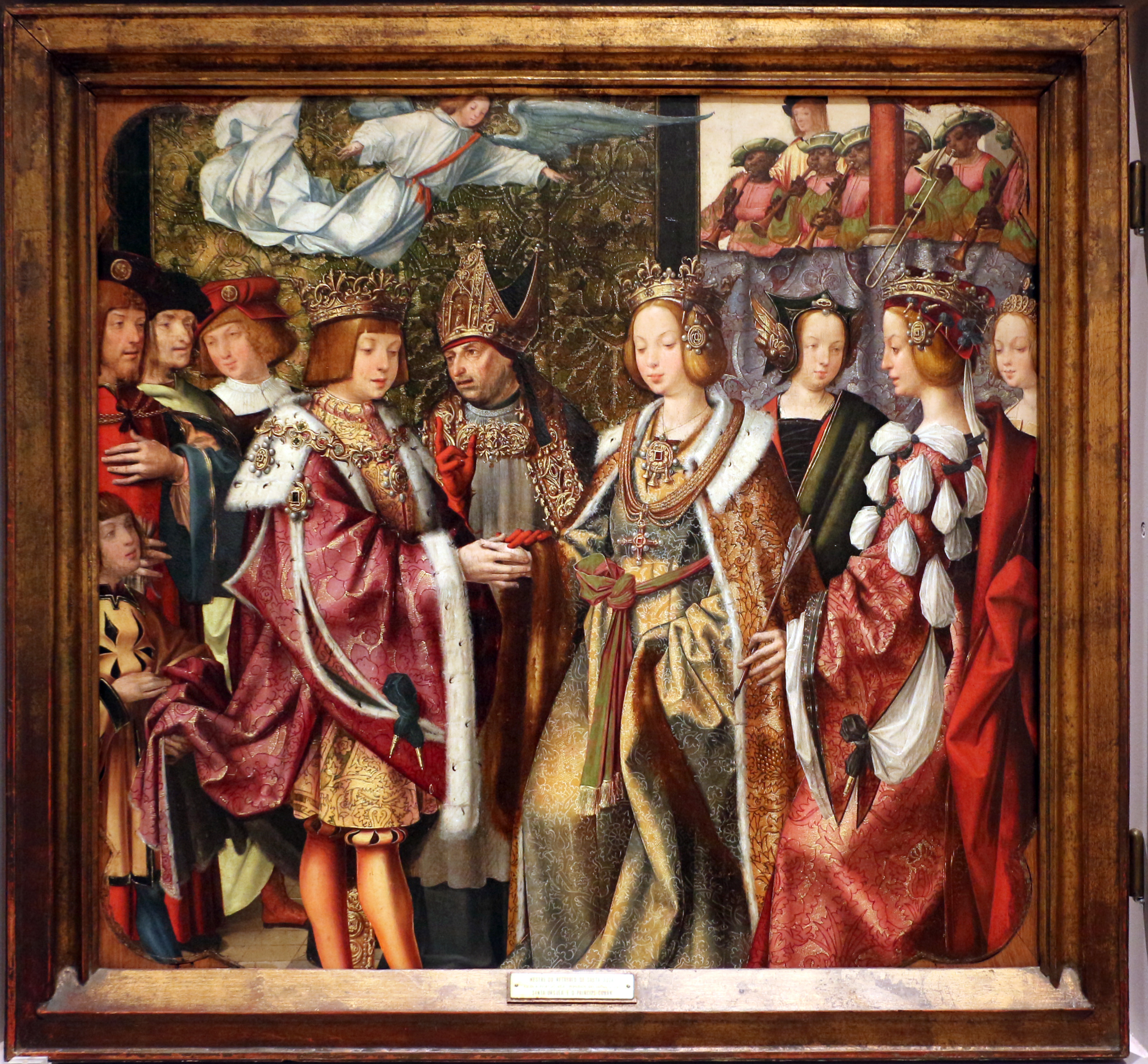
The Engagement of St Ursula and Prince Etherius panel

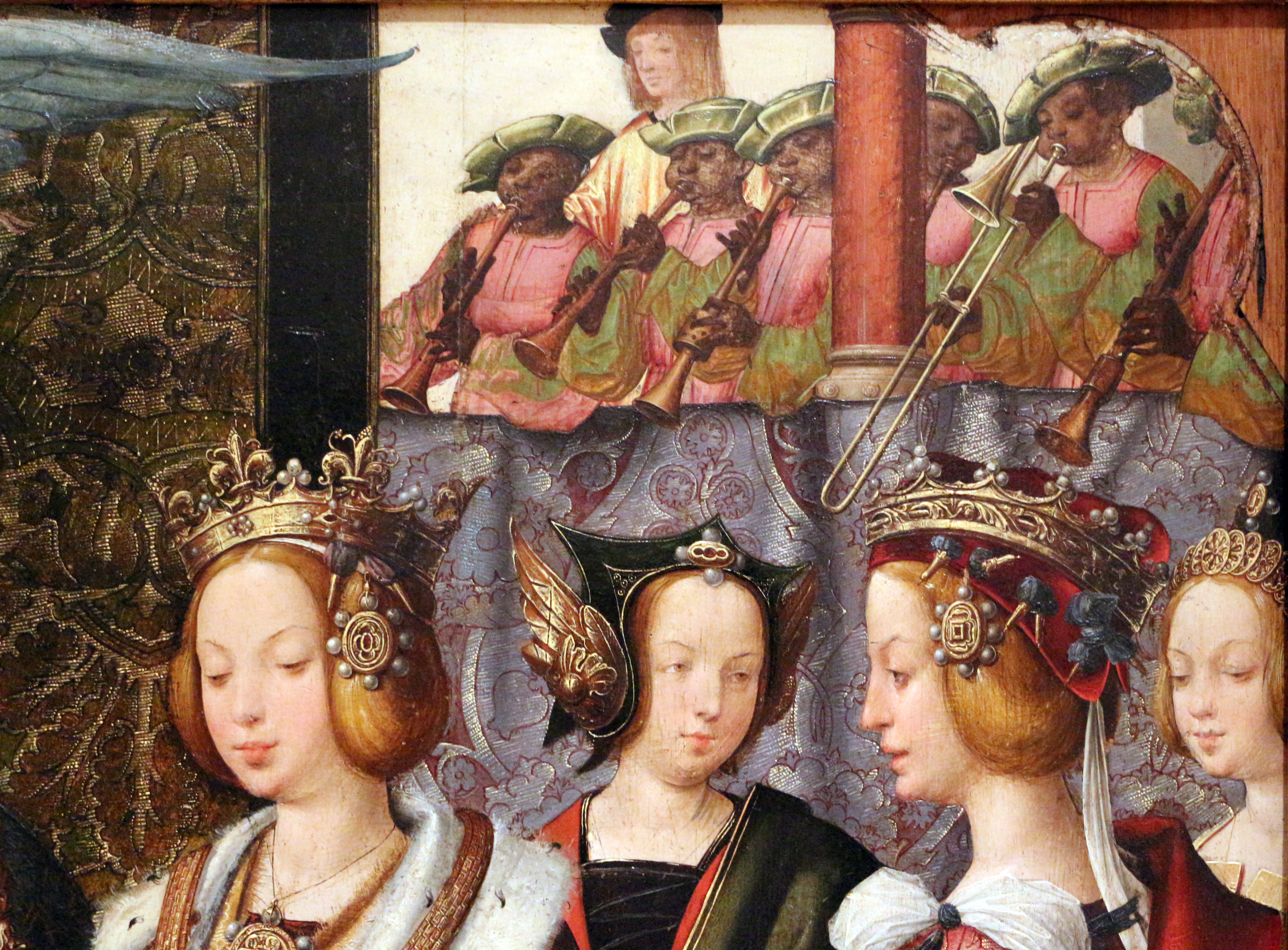
Detail showing the African musicians.

The Engagement of St Ursula and Prince Etherius (also known as Marriage of St. Ursula and Prince Conan) is a panel from the Saint Auta Altarpiece commissioned in 1522 by Eleanor, Queen of Portugal for the Convent of Madre de Deus, Lisbon, Portugal. It was painted by an artist known as the Master of the Altarpiece of Santa Auta. It shows the betrothal of the 4th-century Roman-British Saint Ursula to Etherius, also known as Conan Meriadoc, British Celtic leader. It also features a group of African musicians at the Portuguese court.

St Auta, for whom the altarpiece is named, was reportedly one of 11,000 virgins who accompanied St Ursula on her journey to Cologne where she was martyred. Her relics were brought to Portugal in 1517, and the pope recognised her as a saint in 1521.

The painting is in the National Museum of Ancient Art in Lisbon.
