= Berardo - Art Deco Museum =

Museum in Lisbon, Portugal

- Berardo – Museu Art Deco
- The museum in the shadow of the 25 April bridge, Lisbon
- Established: 24 April 2021
- Location: Lisbon, Portugal
- Coordinates: 38°42′15″N 09°10′45″W
- Type: Design museum
- Founder: Joe Berardo
- Owner: Associação de Colecções
- Public transit access: Yes
- Parking: 100m.
- Website: bmad.pt

The Berardo - Art Deco Museum (B-MAD) is an Art Deco museum in Lisbon, capital of Portugal, that also displays Art Nouveau pieces that contribute to the understanding of Art Deco. It is an initiative of the Associação de Colecções (Association of Collections), established by the Portuguese businessman, Joe Berardo. The museum opened to the public on 24 April 2021.

== History of the building ==
The building is the former summer residence of the Marquis of Abrantes, which he commissioned to be built in the first half of the 18th century. His then primary residence is now the French Embassy in Lisbon. The building was acquired in the first decade of the 20th century by Guilhermina Júlia da Cunha Pereira Flores, mother of António José Pereira Flores (1883-1957), a physician and researcher, who was a close friend of the Nobel Prize winner, António Egas Moniz (1874-1955), who lived in the house for some time. The hospital named after Moniz is a short distance from the museum.

António Flores was a contemporary of the architect Raúl Lino (1879-1974), who he invited, in the 1920s, to extend the building. The main body was enlarged, due to the need for space to accommodate the whole family. Second and third floors were added as well as a lookout over the River Tagus. Further changes had to be made to accommodate the construction of the 25 de Abril Bridge, formerly known as the Salazar Bridge, named after the leader of the authoritarian Estado Novo dictatorship, António de Oliveira Salazar. The bridge opened in 1966.

== The Exhibition ==
B-MAD exhibits an important collection of Art Nouveau and Art Deco objects. This is the first time that the two collections have been presented together, following exhibition of the Art Deco Collection in Azeitão, Porto, Sintra, and the Berardo Collection Museum in Belém, and on the Portuguese island of Madeira, the birthplace of Joe Berardo, as well as in several international museums. The new museum brings together parts of the Berardo collection never before exhibited, plus a number of recent acquisitions. The inaugural exhibition shows decorative arts from the final decade of the 19th century to the outbreak of the Second World War.

The exhibition has works by some of the most notable Art Nouveau and Art Deco designers and artists. They include Émile-Jacques Ruhlmann, Jean-Michel Frank, Jacques Adnet, Maurice Dufrêne, Jules Leleu, Paul Follot, Louis Majorelle, René Lalique, Jean Puiforcat, August Herborth, Edgar Brandt and Eileen Gray. The display includes furniture, ironwork, lamps, glassware, ceramics, tableware and silverware, together with paintings, sculpture, drawings, fashion and jewellery. The exhibition also contains drawings by Émile-Jacques Ruhlmann of the Casa de Serralves in Porto, a major example of art deco civil architecture. Also exhibited are some of more than 5000 original silverware drawings of the Porto-based jewellers Ourivesaria Reis & Filhos. The Association has also preserved furniture from Casa Vicent and Casa Império, both businesses in Porto.

== Gallery ==
Decorative glass vessels and furniture

Iron gates by Paul Kiss, c.1920

Cabinet in the style of Paul Kiss, c.1935, with Murano floor lamps and a Diana panel

Cabinet and fall-front secretary attributed to René Drouet, probably late 1930s

Dining-room furniture by Georges Champion, c.1926

Dining table and chairs with a silver service

Cutlery service and fitted cabinet by Sigvard Bernadotte for Georg Jensen, 1930s

Stylized cat sculpture

Library cabinet by Éric Bagge, c.1935

Cabinet beneath Le Havre by Béla de Kristo, 1956

Display cabinet attributed to Jules Leleu

Desk and chair by Alfred Porteneuve for Olivier & Desbordes, 1935

Dancer sculpture in a mirrored hall

Decorative screen, chair and writing cabinet

Dining furniture and wall painting

Ornamental framed mirror

Settee beneath Baigneurs sous bois by Émile Quentin-Brin, 1940s

Table, chairs, mirror and an iron screen attributed to Paul Kiss

Longcase clock

Display cabinet with decorative vessels

Ornamental glazed cabinet

Writing cabinet flanked by chairs and wall lamps

Glass console table with a decorative vase and framed painting

Display of decorative glass vessels

Mirror by Marcel Kammerer for Otto Wagner Atelier, c.1930, and table lamps with Daum Frères shades

Decorative folding screen, chair and stand

Mirrored cabinet flanked by chairs

Ornamentally decorated wooden cabinet

Cabinet with a circular decorated front panel

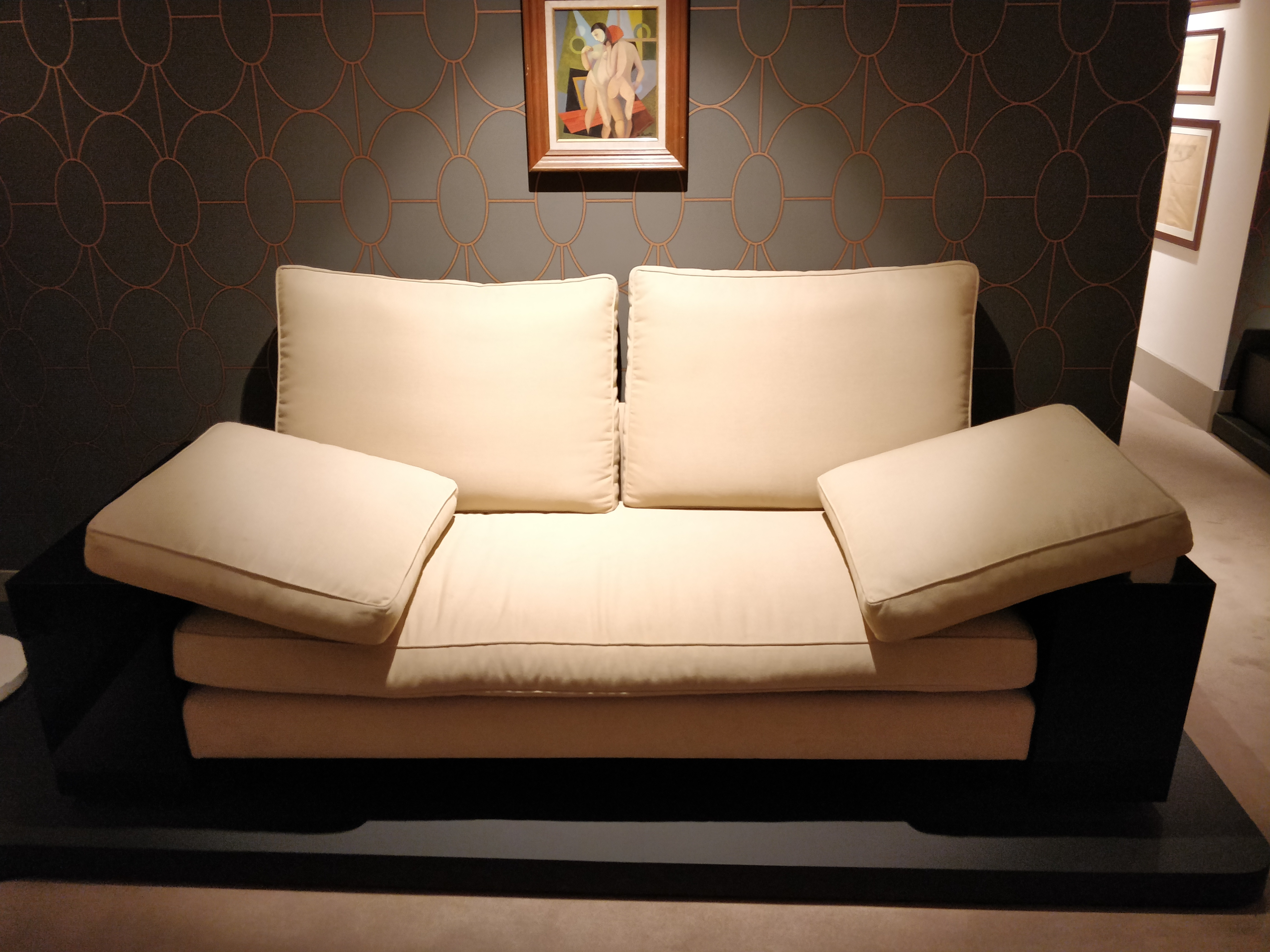
Sofa designed by Eileen Gray
