= Odette Ferreira =

Portuguese microbiologist and HIV researcher

- Born: Maria Odette Santos Ferreira; 4 June 1925; Lisbon, Portugal
- Died: 7 October 2018 (aged 93); Lisbon, Portugal
- Occupation: Microbiologist
- Known for: HIV/AIDS researcher who contributed to identification of HIV-2 virus and headed a Portuguese Government programme to reduce the incidence of AIDS

Maria Odette Santos Ferreira (4 June 1925 – 7 October 2018) was a Portuguese professor of microbiology who played an important role in research on HIV, through the identification of the HIV-2 virus in association with the Pasteur Institute of Paris. She was also the coordinator of the Portuguese programme to fight AIDS, overseeing the "Say no to a second-hand syringe" project, which resulted in the collection and exchange by pharmacies of 43 million used syringes between 1993 and 2008.

== Early life ==
Ferreira was born in Lisbon, Portugal, on 4 June 1925. Her grandfather was the owner of the first pharmacy on the island of Bolama in Portuguese Guinea and her father was a civil servant there. Her uncles were also pharmacists. Ferreira moved to Bolama when she was only three months old. Back in Portugal at the age of 10, she attended the Colégio Moderno in Lisbon.

== Education ==
After obtaining a bachelor's degree, Ferreira had to postpone further academic training. The pharmacy faculty at the University of Lisbon had been closed since 1932, and the only institution able to offer a Pharmacy degree was in Porto. Her father, however, would not let her go alone to Porto to study. In 1968, the pharmacy faculty reopened in Lisbon, enabling her to continue her chosen studies, graduating in pharmaceutical studies in 1970. She then became an assistant professor at the University of Lisbon, responsible for practical instruction in microbiology, bacteriology, and virology. She was soon invited to spend a three-month internship with the Pasteur Institute, leaving her husband, also a pharmacist, and two daughters behind in Lisbon to go to Paris. On completing the internship, where she had been made aware of techniques for identifying the AIDS virus, she started a doctorate on the topic of hospital infections, receiving a PhD from Paris-Sud University in 1977.

== Career ==
In the 1970s, Ferreira began collaborating with the Pasteur Institute to carry out an epidemiological study of hospital infections caused by the Pseudomonas aeruginosa bacillus observed in Lisbon hospitals. Her studies led to the identification of Portuguese lysotypes that had not previously been categorised. After the Carnation Revolution (25 April 1974), in which the authoritarian Estado Novo government was overthrown, she had several different roles in the reorganization of the University of Lisbon, as a member of the Board of Directors and of the Pedagogical Council.

In the 1980s, Ferreira worked continuously with the Pasteur Institute, where she developed detection techniques for the HIV-1 lymphadenopathy-associated virus (LAV), one of the etiological agents of HIV, and made the first diagnoses of cases of AIDS in Portugal, including that of the famous Portuguese singer António Variações. In September 1985, she flew to Paris from Lisbon with test tubes of blood in her coat. She held them close to her body to keep the blood at body temperature, necessary to maintain the stability of the samples, and also to be able to pass through security without inspection. The blood came from a patient from Guinea-Bissau who had been admitted to the Egas Moniz Hospital in Lisbon. It was known that people in Guinea-Bissau had AIDS but researchers could not find antibodies to HIV-1 in their blood. The research Ferreira carried out at the Pasteur Institute in the following two weeks, together with Nobel Prize winners Françoise Barré-Sinoussi and Luc Montagnier, culminated in the identification of a new type of AIDS virus, HIV-2, and paved the way for comparative studies between HIV-1 and HIV-2.

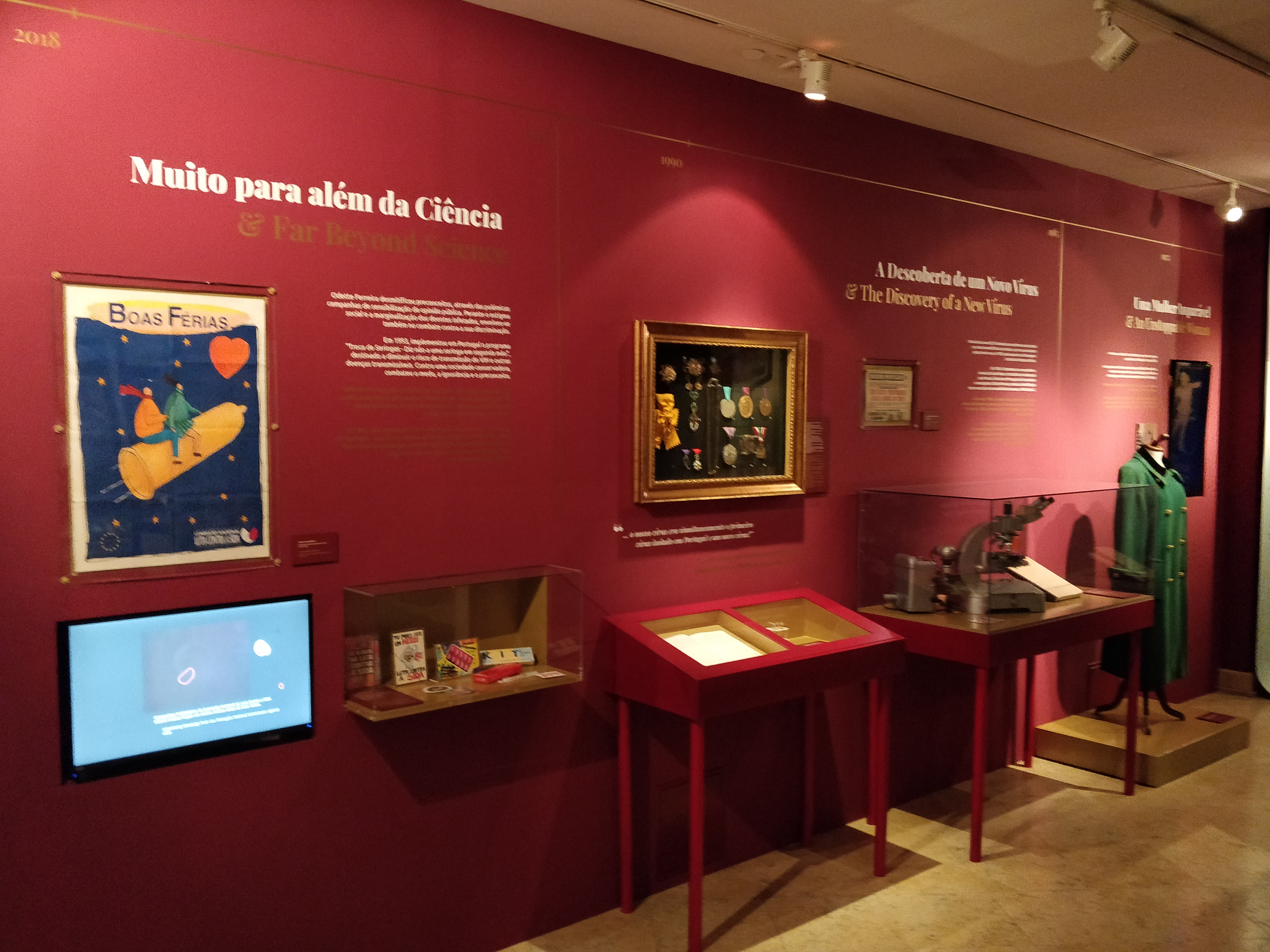
Display at the Lisbon Health and Pharmacy Museum in honour of Odette Ferreira

From this time all of Ferreira's scientific activity was focused on the study of the HIV/AIDS infection, in particular on the less-virulent HIV-2. Her discovery of HIV-2, its epidemiology and diagnosis, made in collaboration with the Pasteur Institute and with José Luis Champalimaud from the Egas Moniz Hospital, came to revolutionize the world of serological diagnosis and helped the Retrovirus and Associated Infections Unit (CPM-URIA) at the University of Lisbon to expand and concentrate important lines of research in the area of retroviruses. Following this discovery, Ferreira and Champalimaud were invited to become consultants to the World Health Organization's AIDS Programme.

Ferreira became Professor of Microbiology at the University of Lisbon in 1986 and played a major role in the creation of the university's microbiology laboratory. In 1992 she was appointed coordinator of the Portuguese National Programme to fight AIDS, a position she held until 2000. Under her, the "Say no to a second-hand syringe" needle-exchange project was introduced, the first such programme in the world. Resulting from a partnership between the Ministry of Health and the National Association of Pharmacies, this project was developed simultaneously throughout Portugal at approximately 2,500 pharmacies. By collecting 43 million used syringes between 1993 and 2008 the programme successfully reduced the risk of intravenous transmission of HIV and other communicable diseases (Hepatitis B and Hepatitis C) to drug addicts. Other projects with significant impact were the establishment of anonymous and free screening centres, and the creation of a centre in Lisbon to provide counselling, analysis, consultation and protection for sex workers.

The work of the National Programme is estimated to have saved several thousand lives. Ferreira visited drug addicts and prostitutes, alerting them to the need to exchange syringes and use condoms. She protested against the "stupidity of fear" and did not hesitate to hug and kiss HIV-positive people, even when she was personally ostracized by people who believed that the AIDS virus was spread like influenza. She promoted several home-support services coordinated by the Solidarity Project of the Santa Casa da Misericórdia de Lisboa, and the construction of a residence to support AIDS patients through provision of palliative care (Residência Madre Teresa de Calcutá).

== Awards ==
In 1975, the French government made Ferreira a Chevalier dans l'Ordre des Palmes Academiques for her role in strengthening scientific cooperation between Portugal and France, and in 1987 she was made a Chevalier de la Légion d'Honneur for her work on HIV. In Portugal, in 1988, she was made a Commander of the Military Order of Saint James of the Sword (Portuguese: Ordem Militar de Sant'Iago da Espada). In 2016, the Ministry of Science, Technology and Higher Education (MCTES) awarded her the Medal of Merit for her "valuable and exceptional contribution to the development of science or scientific culture in Portugal". The Order of Pharmacists (Ordem dos Farmacêuticos) recognized her achievements by awarding her its Medal of Honour and, in 2012, its gold medal. In 2010, the Order of Pharmacists created a scientific research award, which was designated as the "Scientific Research Prize Professor Maria Odette Santos-Ferreira". An award that particularly pleased her was the use of her name for a conference room at the Pharmacy Faculty.

Ferreira died on 7 October 2018. She donated her professional estate to the Lisbon Pharmacy Museum. An exhibition of her work was under preparation with her participation at the time of her death and was held from 21 February 2019 at the museum.
