= André Gonçalves (painter) =

Portuguese painter

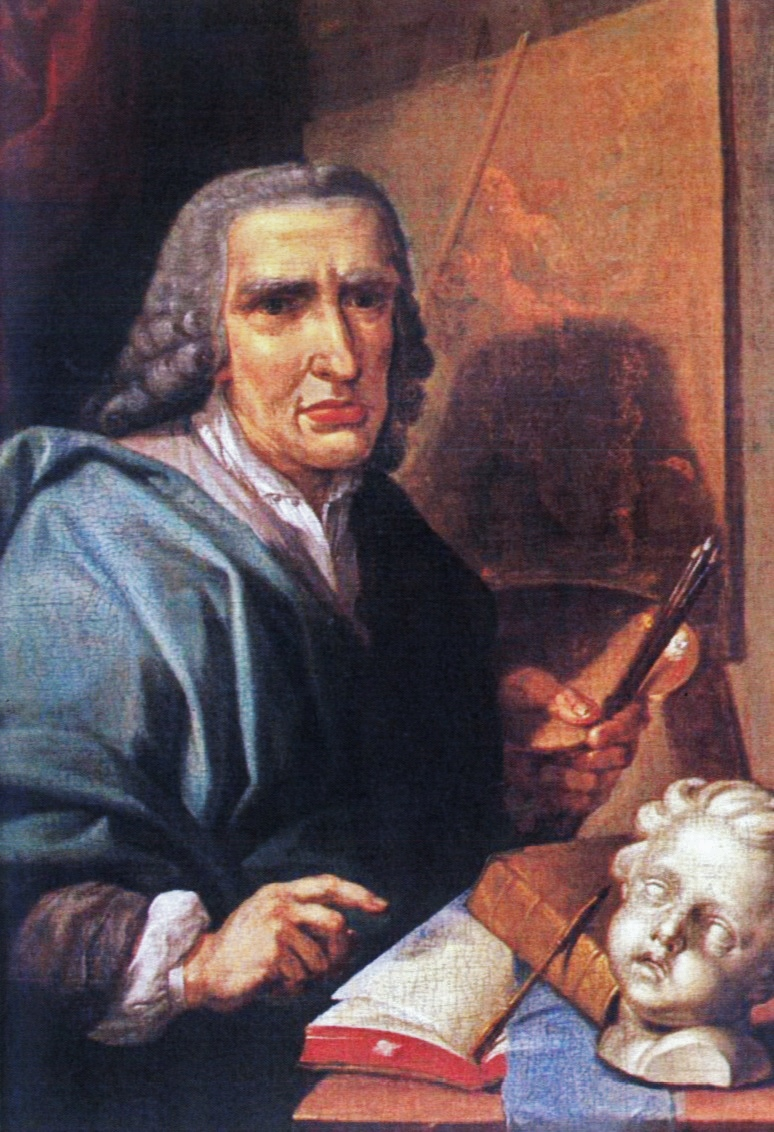
- Portrait of André Gonçalves by Pierre-Antoine Quillard (c.1730), Museum of Évora.
- Born: 1685; Lisbon, Kingdom of Portugal
- Died: 1754 (aged 68–69); Lisbon, Kingdom of Portugal
- Known for: Painting

André Gonçalves (1685 in Lisbon – 1754 in Lisbon), was a Portuguese painter. He was one of the first artists in his country to adopt French and Italian styles of painting, as opposed to the prevailing Spanish styles. Some sources give his years of birth and death as 1692 and 1762, respectively.

== Biography ==
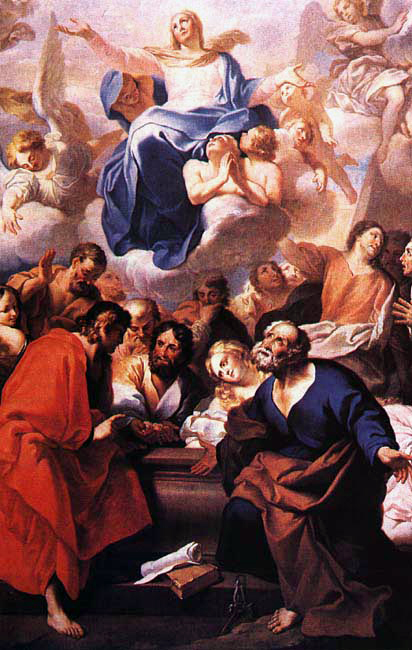
The Assumption (Mafra National Palace)

At sixteen, he began an apprenticeship in the workshops of António de Oliveira Bernardes, where he studied until 1704. In 1711, he joined the local Guild of Saint Luke and remained a member for life. By this time, he had created his first major work depicting a scene from the life of Saint Amaro for the chest in the sacristy of the Saint's namesake chapel in Lisbon.

He began to establish his personal style in the 1720s with work done at the convent of "Our Lady of the Conception of Cardais". At this time, he also appears to have painted the screens in the chapel of "Our Lady Jesuit Church" in Horta on Faial Island, representing the Death of the Virgin and the Apostles at Mary's tomb.

In the early 1730s, he participated in decorating the Mafra Convent at the Mafra National Palace, a major project that brought him into contact with other well-known Portuguese artists, as well as the work of French and Italian Baroque masters. Later, he would work with Vieira Lusitano (who may have been a former student) at the Paulist convent, and the Church of the Child of God.

In the 1740s, he decorated the convent at the Church of Mater Dei. Paintings of Saint Dominic and Saint Joseph at the "Sacred Heart of Jesus Church" in Santa Cruz da Graciosa, have been identified as his.

In the 1750s, he returned to the Church of Mater Dei, where he was commissioned to paint a series of scenes depicting Saint Joseph's life in Egypt for the sacristy and a rendition of The Assumption for the gable in the chancel. Among his final works were a series of portraits of saints for the refectory at the Church of Saint Roch.

Many of his works were destroyed or severely damaged in the Lisbon earthquake of 1755.

== Sources ==
- José Alberto Gomes Machado, André Gonçalves - Pintura do Barroco Português, Estampa, 1996 ISBN 972-331-139-9
- Susana Cavaleiro Ferreira Nobre Gonçalves, André Gonçalves e a Pintura de Cavalete em Portugal no tempo de D. João V (1706-1750). O caminho da Internacionalização (Master of Arts Dissertation, University of Lisbon, 2002) Online
