= Ferreira de Castro =

Portuguese writer and journalist

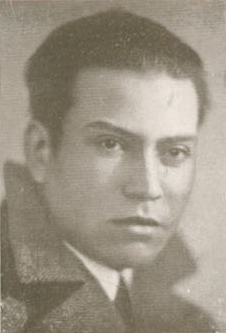
- c. 1933 photograph
- Born: José Maria Ferreira de Castro; 24 May 1898; Oliveira de Azeméis, Portugal
- Died: 29 June 1974 (aged 76); Porto, Portugal
- Burial place: Sintra Mountains
- Occupation: Journalist
- Notable work: A Selva (1930)
- Movement: Neorealism

José Maria Ferreira de Castro (24 May 1898 – 29 June 1974) was a Portuguese writer and journalist. Ferreira de Castro had a long career in journalism, and considered his fiction writing to be an extension of his documentary reporting; in that regard, he is considered to be one of the fathers of contemporary Portuguese social-realist (or neorealist) fiction, a forerunner of socially committed literature about the rural and working classes later further established by Alves Redol, and more than once a nominee for the Nobel Prize in Literature.

Ferreira de Castro was part of the group of noted public intellectuals that were opposed to the authoritarian Estado Novo regime; despite his participation in almost every peaceful action directed against the regime, his national and international recognition as an acclaimed novelist meant he was never a victim of excessively violent repression, such as prison, torture or loss of political rights.

== Life ==
The eldest son of José Eustáquio Ferreira de Castro, a poor peasant, and Maria Rosa Soares de Castro, he lost his father at the age of 8. At 12 years old, he decided to emigrate with the intention of supporting his family. On January 7, 1911, he embarked on the steamship Jerôme bound for Belém do Pará, in Brazil. There, he would publish his first novel, Criminoso por Ambição, in 1916.

Later, for four years, he lived in the rubber plantation of Paraíso, in the middle of the Amazon rainforest, on the banks of the Madeira River. After leaving Paraíso, he lived in precarious conditions, having to resort to jobs such as pasting posters, or as a deckhand on Amazonian ships.

Later, in Portugal, he was editor of the newspaper O Século, director of the newspaper O Diabo and contributor to the magazines O Domingo Ilustrado (1925-1927), Renovação (1925-1926), and Ilustração (started in 1926). While working for O Século he penned vibrant chronicles, such as his purposeful arrest in Limoeiro Jail to witness the lives of prisoners in Portuguese prisons, or his exclusive Dublin interview of Éamon de Valera, leader of Sinn Féin, in 1930.

In 1930, he published A Selva, the work that earned him recognition on an international level, including his nomination to the Nobel Prize in Literature. The book received positive reviews in The New York Times, introduced him to Hollywood and allowed him to join the French Pen Club. At that time, his wife, Diana de Liz, died. The novel is dedicated to her.

After the death of his wife, Ferreira de Castro left for England by boat, in the company of the writer Assis Esperança. He fell ill, diagnosed with sepsis, but was treated by the doctor and art historian Reynaldo dos Santos. As a result of his profound state of mourning, in December 1931, Ferreira de Castro unsuccessfully attempted suicide. He travelled to Madeira for his convalescence, where he wrote the novel Eternidade (1933), on the theme of the obsession with death.

He was also famous for his travel literature, namely his book A Volta ao Mundo, recounting his travels around the world in the outset of World War II.

== Death ==
He suffered a stroke and died shortly after the Carnation Revolution, which he welcomed enthusiastically, having marched on the historic first demonstrations of the International Workers' Day the week that followed the revolution. His remains were buried, following his express wishes, on the Sintra Mountains, by a winding lane that goes up to the Castle of the Moors.

The Ferreira de Castro Museum is in Sintra, where he wrote many of his novels.
