= Sintra Natural History Museum =

Museum in the Lisbon Region of Portugal

Coordinates: 38°47′53.36″N 9°23′23.64″W

- Established: 2009, 1 August
- Location: Sintra, Rua do Paço, 20
- Type: Paleontology, mineralogy, malacology, petrography
- Website: www.cm-sintra.pt

The Sintra Natural History Museum (Portuguese: Museu de História Natural de Sintra) is a museum of natural history located in the historic center of the village of Sintra. The museum has both at national and international level due to the quality and rarity of many of its exhibits.

== History ==
The museum was established in 2009 in the building of the 19th century (1893), and displays thousands of pieces having scientific importance gathered by the collector Miguel Barbosa and his wife Fernanda Barbosa. Children of Eduardo and his wife donated this entomological and malacological estate to the Municipality of Sintra, and then they are placed in the Sintra Natural History Museum.

== Overview ==
The museum has a temporary exhibition room prepared for hosting exhibitions and events; reserve and laboratory for treatment and study of the pieces; a small specialized documentation service; as well as a store in addition to a permanent exhibition room. The educational service of the museum displays presentation permanent exhibition to “tell a story” – the formation of the primitive Earth and mutations it has undergone over the millions of years of the different geological epochs, from Precambrian to Quaternary. It shows the whole evolution of life through the municipal collections of paleontology, mineralogy, malacology and petrography from the most diversified parts of the world.

== Collections ==
It is the 4th natural history museum in the region of Great Lisbon (Portuguese: Região da Grande Lisboa) and differs with its uniqueness having pieces covering all the continents of the Earth. There are more than 10000 fossils, a collection of trilobites and some rare and well preserved specimens of dinosaurs. Minerals with parts of rock, isolated and stoned minerals are also exhibited.

The museum is composed of a collection of paleontology (9416 fossils); a collection of mineralogy (900 minerals); A collection of malacology (1347 shells); A collection of petrography (544 samples of rocks).

Bivalves and some gastropods from diverse origins are exhibited In malacology collection. In the petrography collection, not only the main rocks from the national areas, but also the Nantan meteorite and others are displayed to visitors.

== Exhibits ==
- Dinosaurs and nests of dinosaur eggs (from the Gobi Desert, China)
- Fragments of the Nantan meteorite (16th century, China)
- Flying reptile, Braseodactylus (from Brazil)
- Simulation of the Big Bang, and the evolution of life on earth from the Precambrian to the Quaternary periods.

== See also ==
List of museums in Portugal
