= Tebosa =

- Civil parish
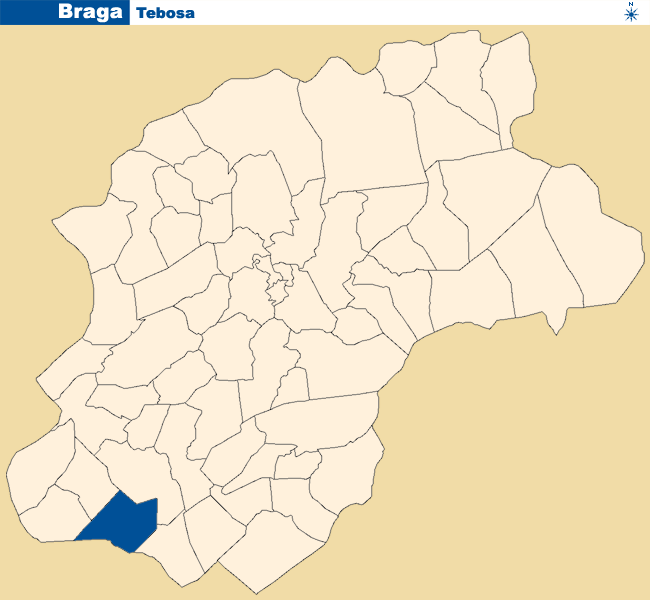
- Coordinates: 41.483°N 8.483°W
- Country: Portugal
- Region: Norte
- Intermunic. comm.: Cávado
- District: Braga
- Municipality: Braga

Area
  - Total: 2.59 km^{2} (1.00 sq mi)

Population (2011)
  - Total: 1,129
  - Density: 436/km^{2} (1,130/sq mi)
- Time zone: UTC+00:00 (WET)
  - Summer (DST): UTC+01:00 (WEST)

Tebosa is a Portuguese parish, located in the municipality of Braga. The population in 2011 was 1,129, in an area of 2.59 km^{2} (1.00 sq mi).

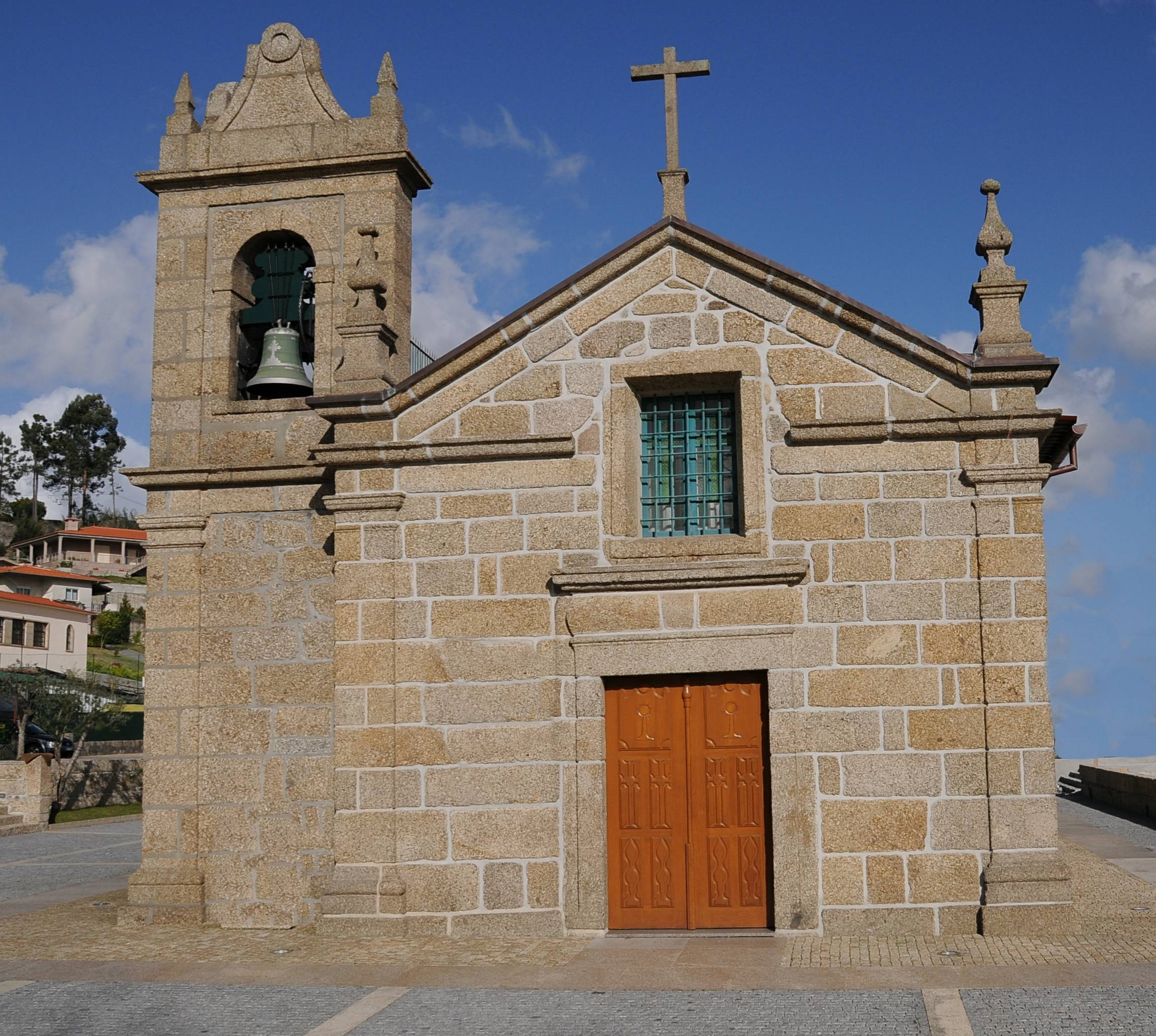
Tebosa Church

== Main sights ==
- Stringed Instruments Museum
