= Port Wine Museum =

Museum in Porto, Portugal

- Museu do Vinho do Porto
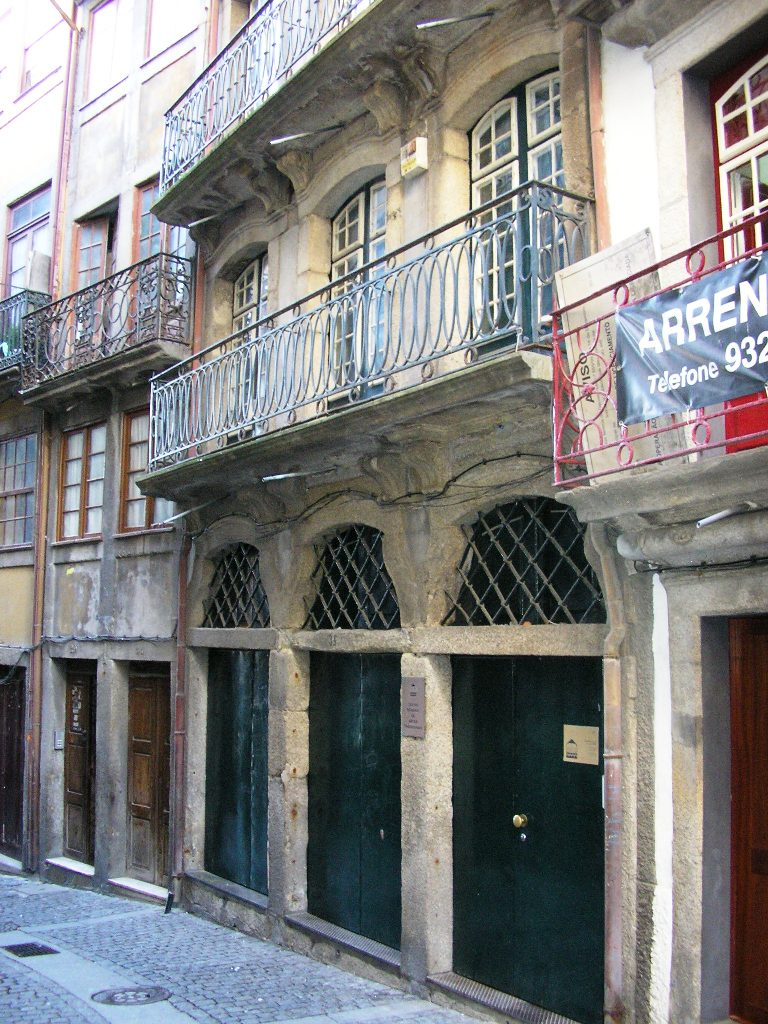
- Established: 2004
- Location: Rua Reboleira 37, Porto, Portugal
- Coordinates: 41.1450°N 8.6267°W

The Port Wine Museum (Museu do Vinho do Porto) is a museum located in Porto, Portugal. The museum recounts the history of port wine and its relevance to the city and the country. The museum is located in an 18th-century warehouse, the Companhia Geral da Agricultura das Vinhas do Alto Douro, next to Douro River.

== History ==
The Port Wine Museum was founded in 2004. In March 2019, the Port Wine museum was transferred to the New Port Wine Museum on Rua Reboleira 37.
