= Casa-Museu Marta Ortigão Sampaio =

Museum in Porto, Portugal

Coordinates: 41.1593°N 8.6255°W

The Casa-Museu Marta Ortigão Sampaio (Marta Ortigão Sampaio's House Museum) is a small museum located in the city of Porto, Portugal. Marta was born in Porto into an upper-class family in end of 19th century, her father being a prominent intellectual, Vasco Ortigão Sampaio. She never actually lived in this house; her husband died prematurely during the construction of the house. Instead, she remained in the neighboring city of Matosinhos and became a collector of art in the vibrant bourgeois environment of Porto of the 19th century. The house exhibits impressive pieces of furniture as well as jewelry, painting and other art objects, including works of the Portuguese painters Silva Porto, Aurélia de Souza, Sofia Martins de Sousa and Marques de Oliveira.
