= Pharmacy Museum, Lisbon =

Museum in Portugal

Pharmacy Museum
- Museu da Farmácia
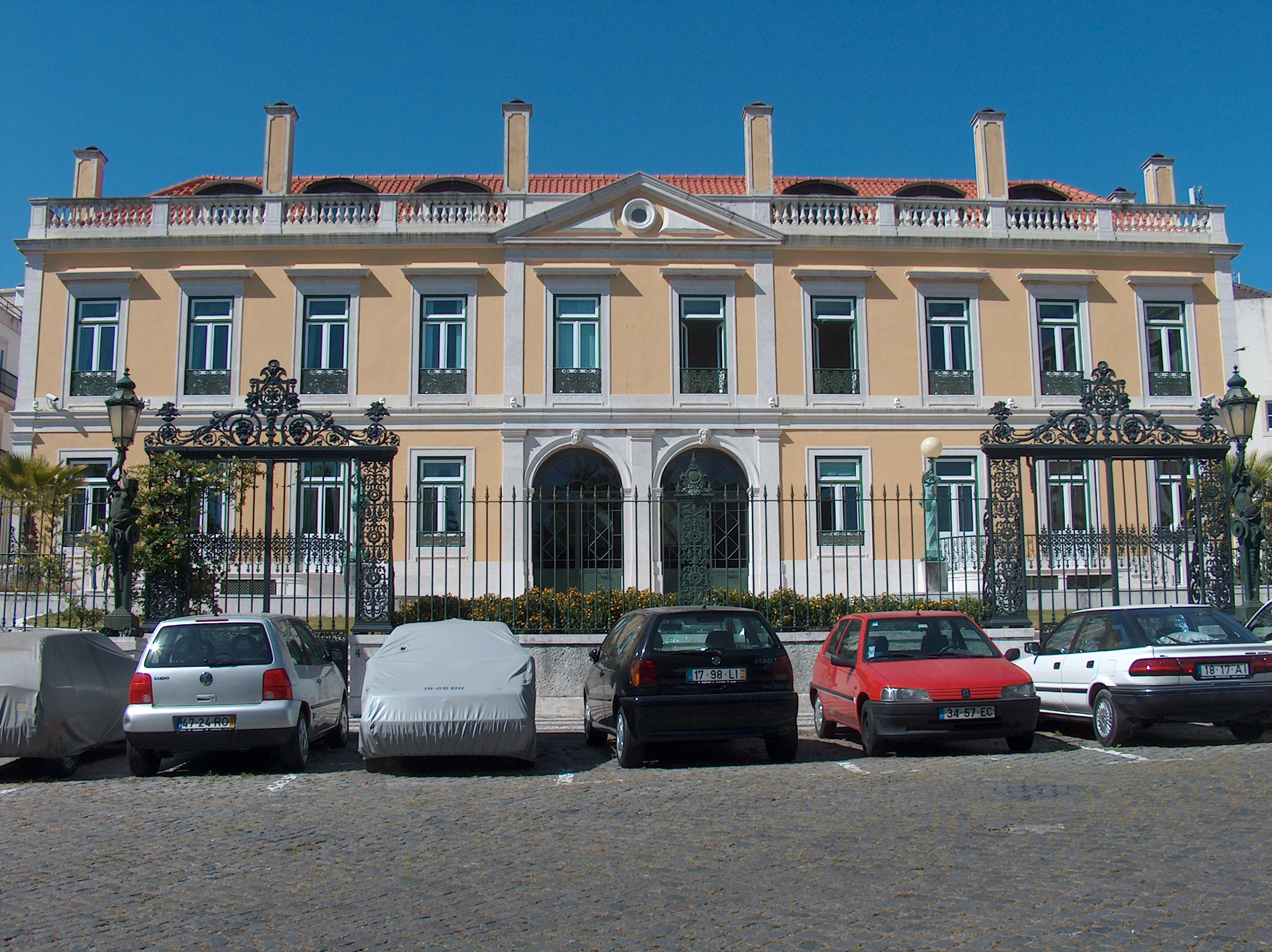
- Outside view of the museum
- Interactive fullscreen map
- Established: June 1996
- Location: R. Mal. Saldanha 1, 1249-069, Lisbon, Portugal
- Coordinates: 38°42′37″N 09°08′50″W
- Type: Health and Pharmacy museum
- Director: Dr Joao Neto
- Website: https://www.museudafarmacia.pt/pagina.aspx?lang=en&id=12

The Pharmacy Museum of Lisbon is a museum dedicated to the history of pharmaceutical activity. It was established in the building of the National Association of Pharmacies, in the Santa Catarina district of the Portuguese capital, and was inaugurated in June 1996. A branch of the museum was created in the city of Porto in 2010. The first pieces that formed the Lisbon museum were those donated from the private collection of Dr. Salgueiro Basso. These were followed by several donations from other pharmacists and institutions, following a request sent out by the association, which were augmented by purchases worldwide. The collection represents over 5,000 years of health history.

== Collection ==
The collection consists of over 15,000 pieces from various locations together with recreations of three pharmacies from Portugal and one from the former Portuguese colony of Macau, the only authentic Chinese pharmacy displayed in the western world. There is also a military pharmacy, and portable pharmacies used by King Carlos on his yacht, the Portuguese racing driver Carlos Sousa in the 2006 Dakar Rally, Roald Amundsen on his 1911 expedition to the North Pole, and by American astronauts on the Space Shuttle. Items include those from the Pre-Columbian era, which identified analgesic and hallucinogenic plants; Egypt, Mesopotamia and the Arab world, which introduced pharmaceuticals that included syrups and other confections that used sugar or honey; the Tibetan approach that valued having a thorough knowledge of the human body; the Middle Ages, which saw the separation of the medical and pharmaceutical professions; and the modern age, which saw the emergence of instruments such as microscopes and thermometers. There are also exhibitions devoted to African medicine, which has developed rituals for the treatment of the body and spirit of patients, using sacrifices and dances as healing methods, as well as traditional Chinese medicine.

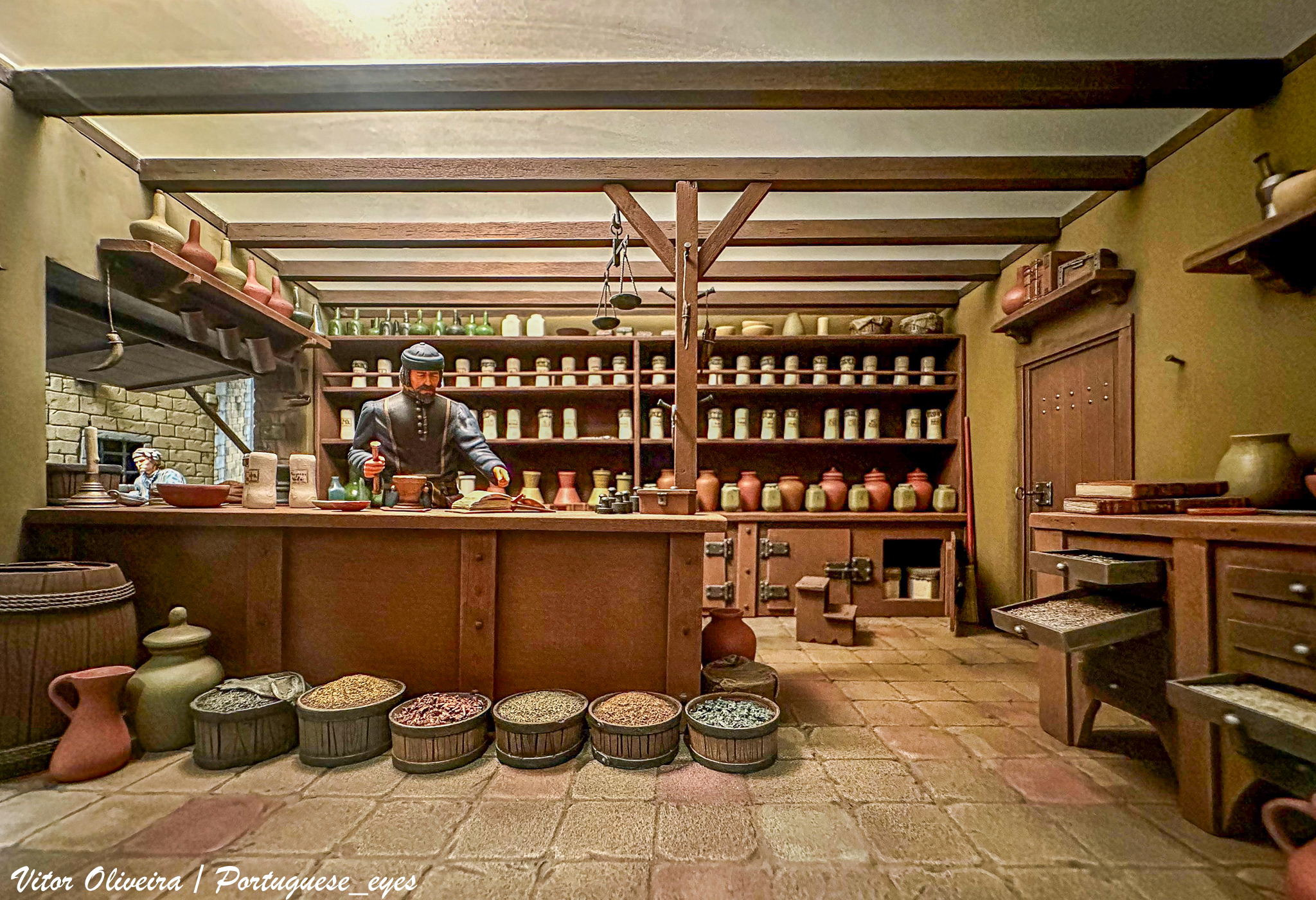
One of the recreated pharmacies at the museum

Specific items on display include tools used by pharmacies to manufacture medicines, such as mortars and scales, as well as many storage vessels and bottles, including ancient Greek storage jars, Roman glass ointment bottles, and Ottoman carafes. A major exhibit is an Egyptian sarcophagus. Products sold in early Portuguese pharmacies in the 18th and 19th centuries, such as Água de Inglaterra a cure for malaria, are exhibited. The museum has a good display of laboratory equipment such as distillers, a furnace, scales, copper and cast-iron pots and retorts. Another display shows embalmed animals or animal parts, tiger bones, snake venom and other items used to prepare remedies. Notable in the exhibition of storage vessels are pictures on the containers that enable us to identify the usage of the various medicinal powders that they contained. A collection of household remedies is stored in drawers that show the relevant parts of the human body for treatment with the cure contained inside. Other items to be seen include chastity belts and early condoms.

In addition, the museum focuses on important Portuguese chemists, such as Odette Ferreira who played a significant role in identifying the HIV-2 virus.

== Awards received ==
The Pharmacy Museum in Lisbon has won numerous awards, including:

- Best Portuguese Museum in 1996, 1997, 1998
- Best Pharmaceutical Project in 1999
- Premio Almofariz 1999
- National Design and Communication Award in 2002
- Nominated for the European Museum of the Year Award in 2004
- Best Cultural Extension Service Award in 2008
