= Casa da Rua de D. Hugo =

Coordinates: 41.1430°N 8.6105°W

Residence Rua D. Hugo
- Casa da Rua D. Hugo
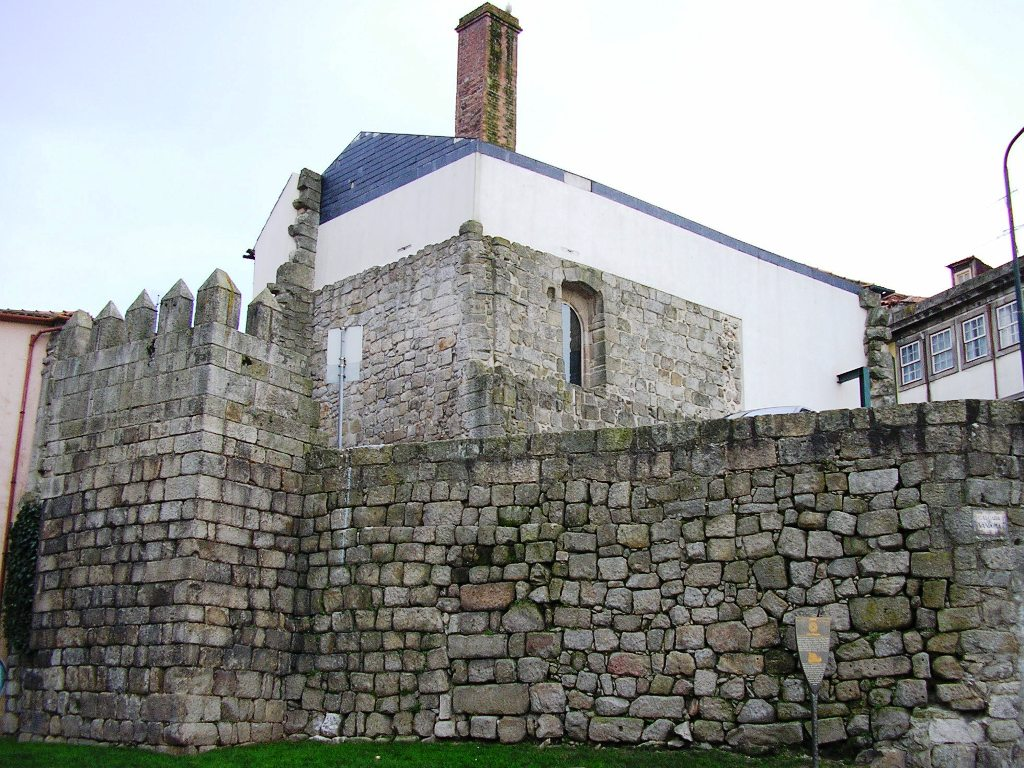
- An exterior view of the Residence on Rua D. Hugo showing a mix of typologies
- Interactive map of the Residence Rua D. Hugo area

General information
- Type: Residence
- Architectural style: Medieval
- Location: Cedofeita, Santo Ildefonso, Sé, Miragaia, São Nicolau e Vitória, Portugal
- Owner: Portuguese Republic

Technical details
- Material: Granite

Design and construction
- Architect: Maria Helena Rente

The Residence Rua D. Hugo (Portuguese: Casa da Rua D. Hugo, 5/Arqueossítio da Rua de D. Hugo) is a residence and archaeological site in the civil parish of Cedofeita, Santo Ildefonso, Sé, Miragaia, São Nicolau e Vitória, in the municipality of Porto, in the Portuguese district of Porto.

== History ==
Traces unearthed in the 1980s, trace antecedents to a proto-historic redoubt, that may have assisted in early Roman occupation, leading to a late medieval successor. The original "residence" was Gothic but destroyed; the owners took advantage of the original walls to construct a new building.

In 1871, the residence was owned by Manuel Cardoso Corte Real.

In the 1980s, archeological excavations were undertaken in the interior of the building, revealing that the site was likely occupied far earlier than originally expected; human occupation remotes to the 4th or 5th century.

In 1993, the building was recuperated and the seat of the Secção Regional do Norte da Ordem dos Arquitectos (North Regional Section of the Order of Architects) was transferred to site. The following year the site won the João de Almada prize for the onsite architectural design.

== Architecture ==
The residence is located in an urban area, adjacent to a visible medieval wall, alongside the Sé Cathedral, with a small parking area in the northwest.

The interior, at 3 metres (9.8 ft) depth, through 20 layers of archaeological excavations, archaeologists discovered integrated architectural ruins dating to the 4th century. These included the vestiges of a proto-historic Castro that lead to the formation of the city, as well as Roman and late Medieval periods.
