= Madre de Deus Convent =

Monastery in Lisbon, Portugal

Coordinates: 38.7247°N 9.1141°W

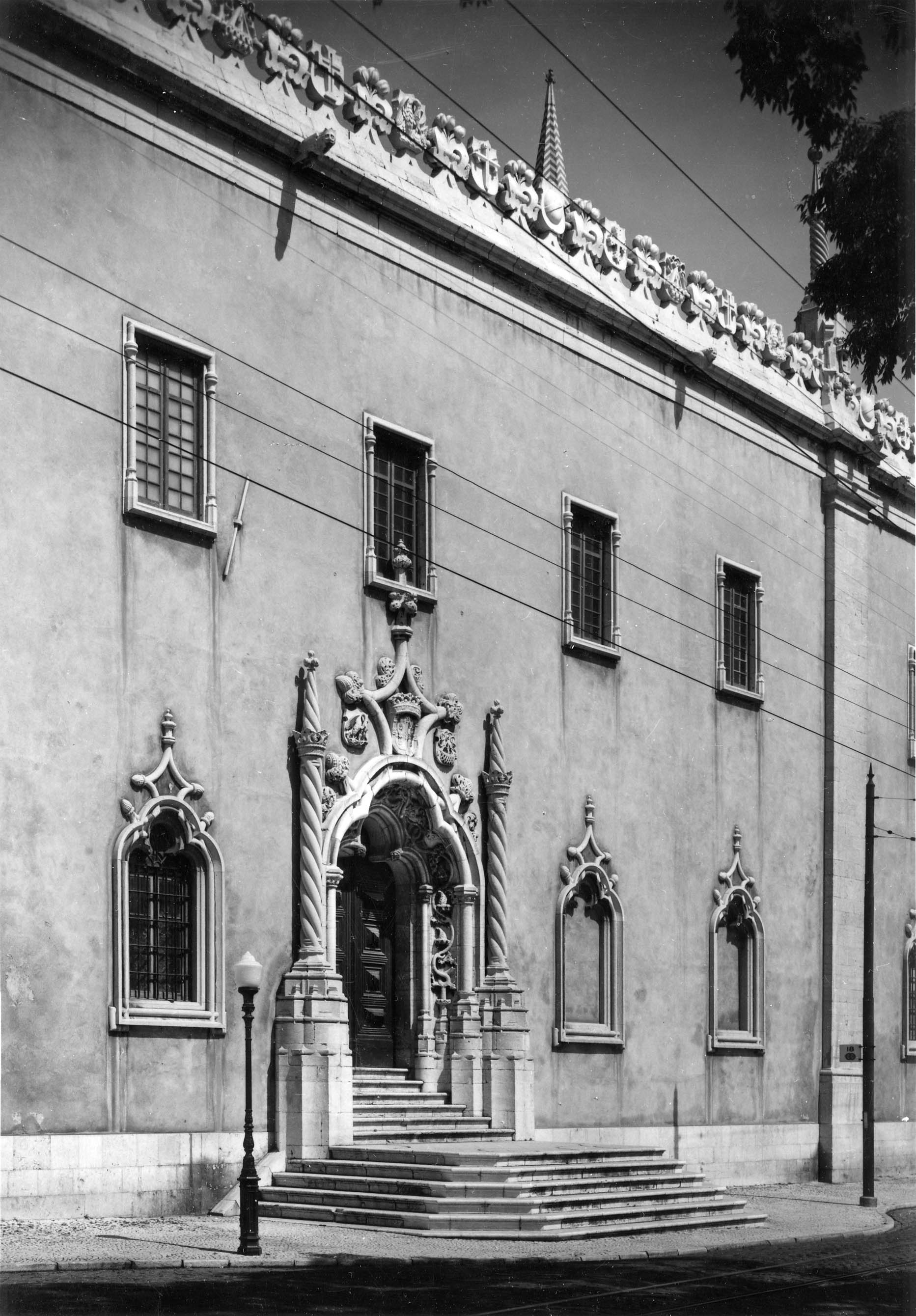
Igreja da Madre de Deus

The Convento de Madre de Deus, or Madre de Deus Convent, is a former convent and church in Lisbon, Portugal, which houses the National Museum of the Azulejo. It is classified as a National Monument.

== Overview ==
Located in Xabregas (formerly Enxobregas) in the eastern part of Lisbon, the Church of the Mother of God was part of the Convent of the same name, founded in the early sixteenth century. National Tile Museum is housed in this building. The church is composed of the rectangular nave and the square main chapel, which adjusts to the size of the sacristy, built in the upper left angle in the shape of an inverted L. The main facade, erected on the side of the temple (as was common in the conventional female churches), is divided into three sections.

== History ==
The Convent of the Mother of God, or Royal Monastery of Enxobregas, was founded in 1509 by the initiative of the queen D. Leonor, wife of D. João II. There were several reforms and restoration done in the building during the reign of D. João III, D. Pedro II, D. João V. The church was partly destroyed by the 1755 earthquake. The church was closed to cult in 1868 with the intend to transform it into a museum. Only in 1957-1958 the works were carried out to realize this project on the occasion of the 500th anniversary of the Birth of Queen Leonor. The Museum was founded in 1965, and the first director became Santos Simões.

== See also ==
- National Azulejo Museum
- Churches in Portugal
- National Monuments of Portugal
- The Engagement of St Ursula and Prince Etherius
