= Museu Militar do Porto =

Military Museum of Porto
- Museu Militar do Porto
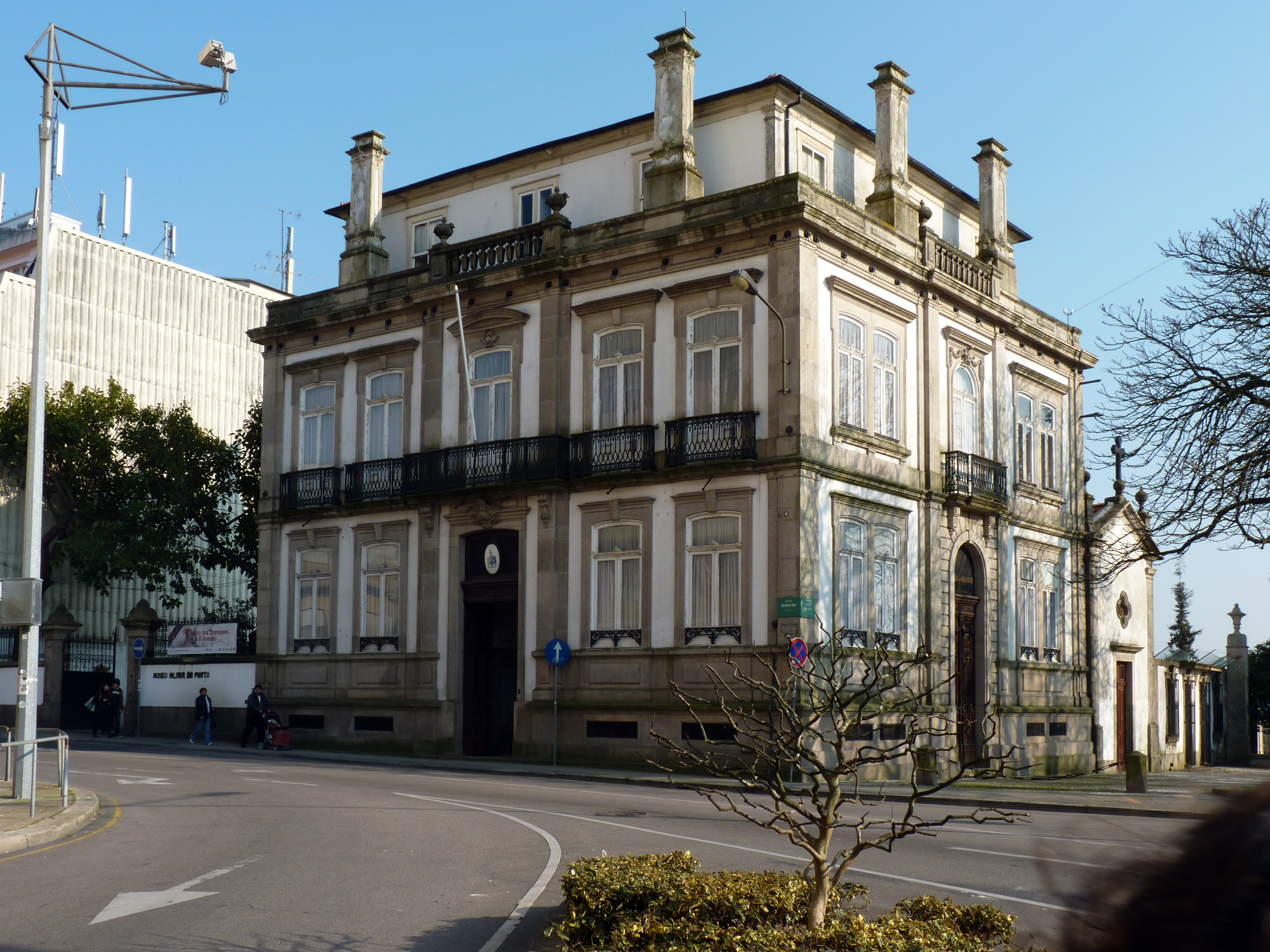
- Main building of the museum
- Established: April 1, 1977
- Location: Bonfim, Porto, Portugal
- Coordinates: 41.1459°N 8.5953°W
- Type: Military museum
- Director: Carlos de Oliveira Andrade
- Owner: Portuguese Army
- Website: exercito.pt/sites/MusMilPORTO

The Museu Militar do Porto (translated: Military Museum of Porto) is a pertaining institution to the Portuguese Army, dedicated for the preservation of military history, located in Porto, Portugal.

== History ==
The creation of a military museum in the city of Porto dates back to the late 19th century, when a portuense painter, Joaquim Vitorino Ribeiro, started collecting pieces and documents related to military history. This collection was then the base of an exposition inaugurated on August 24, 1920, by President António José de Almeida, marking the centenary of the Liberal Revolution of 1820. The exposition resulted in an interest by the City Council in creating a permanent military museum in the city.

By 1957 the commandant-in-chief of the Military Region of Northern Portugal, based in Porto city, conducted a study in order to adapt the Castle of São João da Foz, at Foz do Douro parish, for a museum. However, the idea was definitively abandoned by 1970, due to the high cost of the adaptation of the building. A new location was identified in 1977, in a building in the Rua do Heroísmo, where the delegation of the former secret police PIDE/DGS used to be located between the 1940s up to 1974.

In 1977, the Revolutionary Council, created after the Carnation Revolution of 25 April 1974, legislated the founding of the Museu Militar do Porto. After the proper adaptation of the building and installation of all the contents, the inauguration took place on 21 March 1980 by the President of the Republic, Ramalho Eanes.

In 2025, a proposal by the Portuguese Communist Party was approved to relocate the Military Museum to make way for the creation of a Museum of Anti-Fascist Resistance in Porto.

== Collections ==
The material of the museum has two proveniences: particular offers and obsolete material from the Army, with historical relevance. In 2023, questions arose about the authenticity of a sword on display in the museum that was purportedly wielded by Afonso Henriques.

The collection of miniature figures, displaying the evolution of soldiers since pre-history times till nowadays, is the museum's main attraction. This collection is represented by around 16,000 miniatures, proceeding from the most famous producers of European miniatures, such as Britains, CBG Mignot, Segom, Heyde, Elastolin and Lineol.

The museum also holds a room dedicated to the Revolution of January 31, 1891, the first attempt to establish a Republic in Portugal.

The museum collection also includes several artillery pieces and combat vehicles, from the 15th to the 20th centuries, located in the Park of Heavy Weapons and the Pavilion of Weapons. In this last space, it can also be observed the evolution of the cutting weapons and some collections of firearms.

Moreover, the museum possesses a small thematic library available to the public.

== Building ==
The building where the Military Museum of Porto is installed, located in the nr. 329 of the Rua do Heroísmo, at Bonfim parish, was initially destined to the habitation of D. Maria Coimbra, and was built by the end of the 19th century. It is a characteristic construction of that period. During the Spanish Civil War, it lodged Spanish nuns, and, by 1948, the building was bought by the Portuguese State by 450,000 escudos (equivalent to approx. 2,250 euros) to install the secret police in Porto, the PIDE.
