= Casa Museu Fernando de Castro =

Historic house in Porto, Portugal

Coordinates: 41°09′59″N 8°35′45″W

Visiting only by booking, the Casa Museu Fernando de Castro (Fernando de Castro's House Museum) is a historical house, located in the city of Porto, Portugal, that belonged to Fernando de Castro, a Portuguese poet, caricaturist, merchant and collector. It contains several paintings from the 17th to the 20th century, sculptures and ceramic pieces. The museum is now under administration of the Soares dos Reis National Museum.

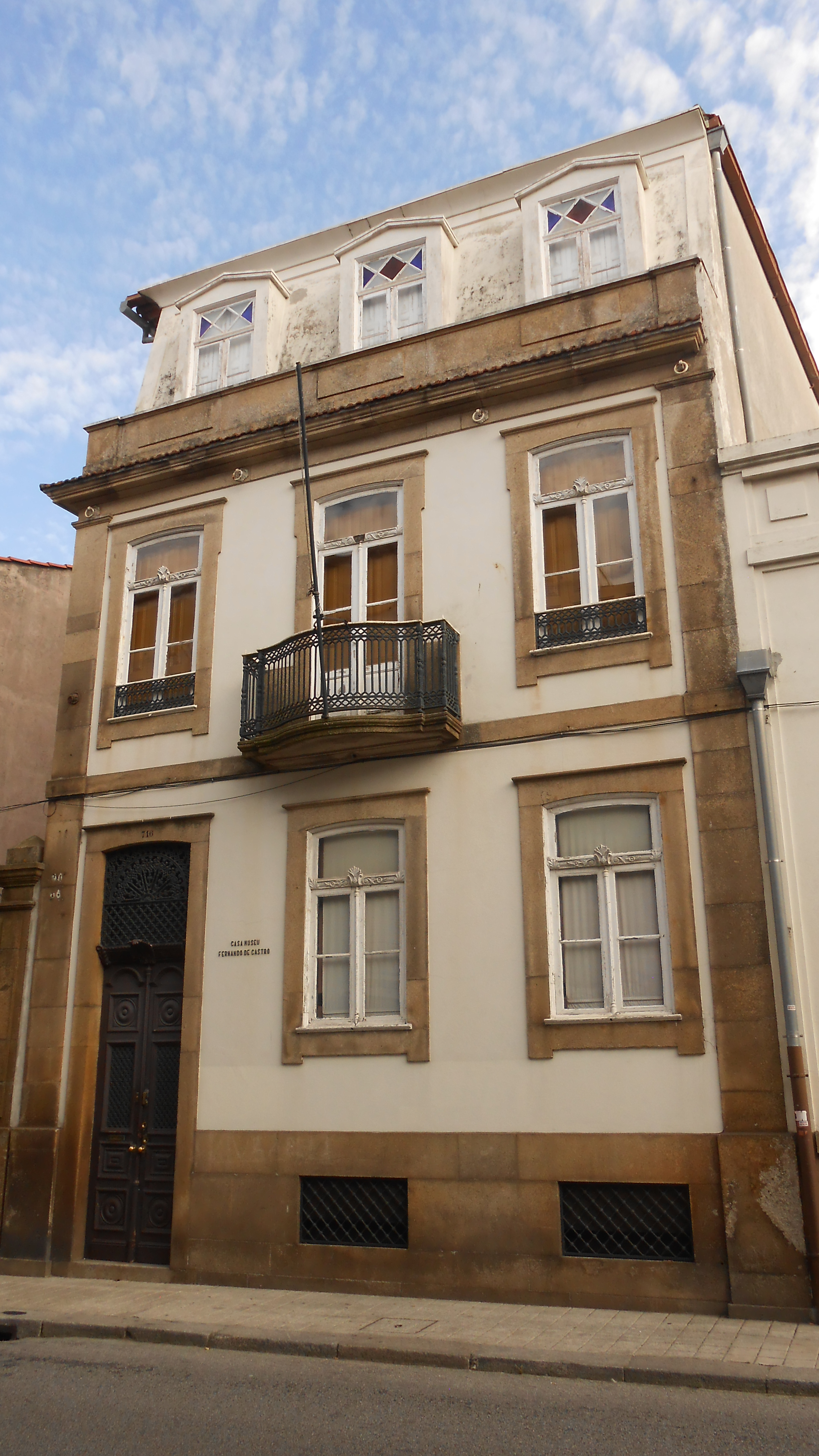
The Casa Museu Fernando de Castro is located in the Rua de Costa Cabral in Paranhos, a parish of the city of Oporto (Porto)

== History ==
Born in 1889 into a family of wealthy merchants, Fernando de Castro inherited a partnership from his father in a commercial company, with shops and offices in several parts of Porto. However, de Castro was not very fond of administrative and business affairs. He dedicated himself to writing and drawing, producing a vast number of cartoons and caricatures. He also published some verse and prose works. De Castro was also an eager collector and lover of art, managing to gather several national and international pieces spanning from the 17th to the 20th century. After his death, in 1952, his sister donated his collection and house to the Portuguese state.

== House ==
Located in Paranhos, a parish of the city of Porto, the house is quite humble from the outside. The interior is finely elaborated and decorated in baroque style, with extensive use of gilded woodcarving resembling that in the majority of churches of the city. It contains several sacred art statues and ceramics of Rafael Bordalo and Teixeira Lopes. The paintings on exhibit include works of several Portuguese painters, including José Malhoa, António Carneiro, Henrique Pousão and Silva Porto.
