= Stringed Instruments Museum =

Coordinates: 41.488385°N 8.472480°W

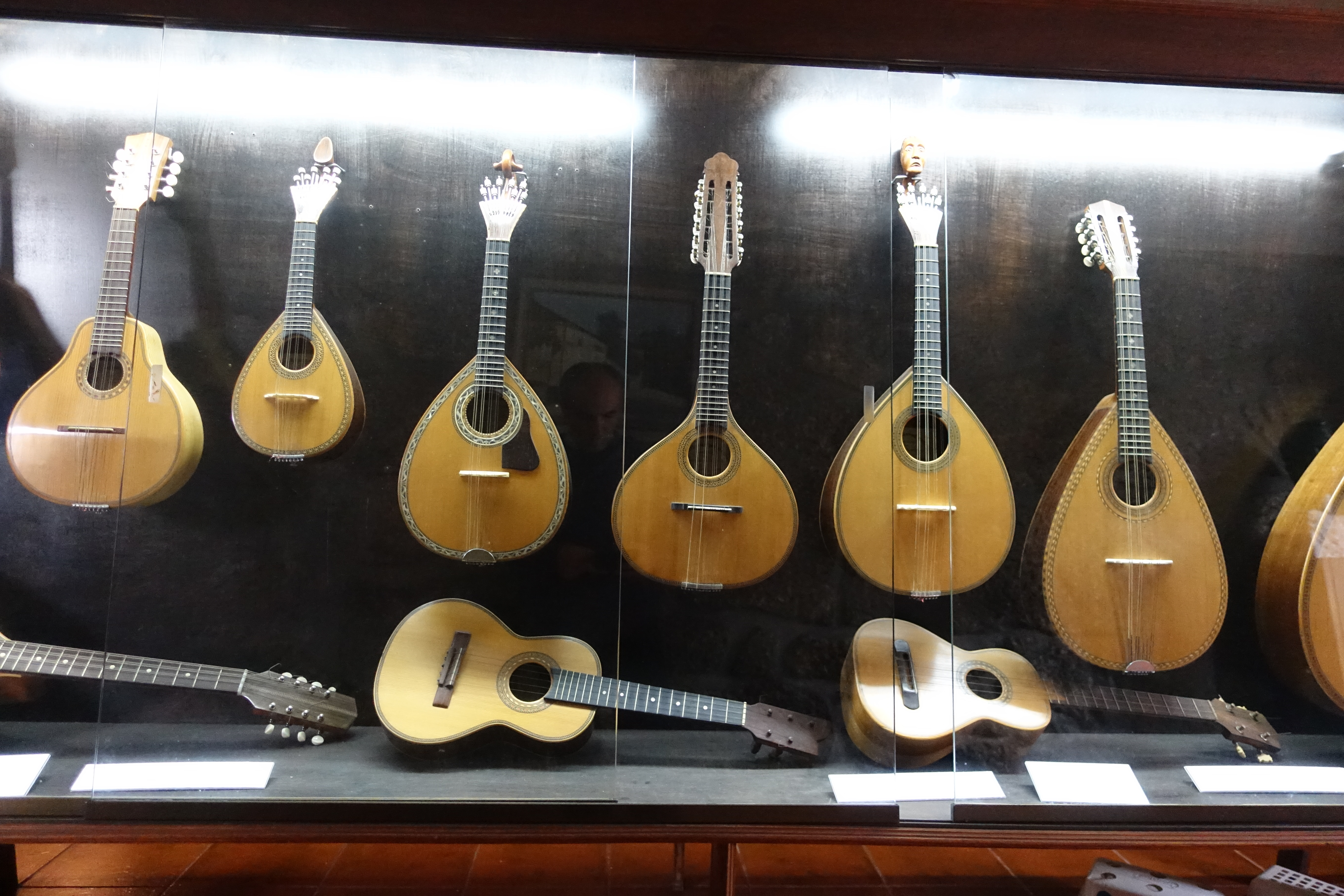
- Established: 1995
- Location: Tebosa, Braga, Portugal
- Type: Music museum
- Director: Domingos Machado

The Stringed Instruments Museum in Portuguese: Museu dos Cordofones is located in Tebosa, in the surroundings of the city of Braga, Portugal dedicated to traditional Portuguese string instruments. The museum opened in 1995.

The collection features Portuguese instruments from the Middle Ages through to modern times, some have fallen into disuse.

In the exhibit are Cavaquinhos, Portuguese guitars, Mandolins, banjos among others.

== See also ==
- List of music museums
