= Ferreira de Castro Museum =

Museum in Sintra, Portugal

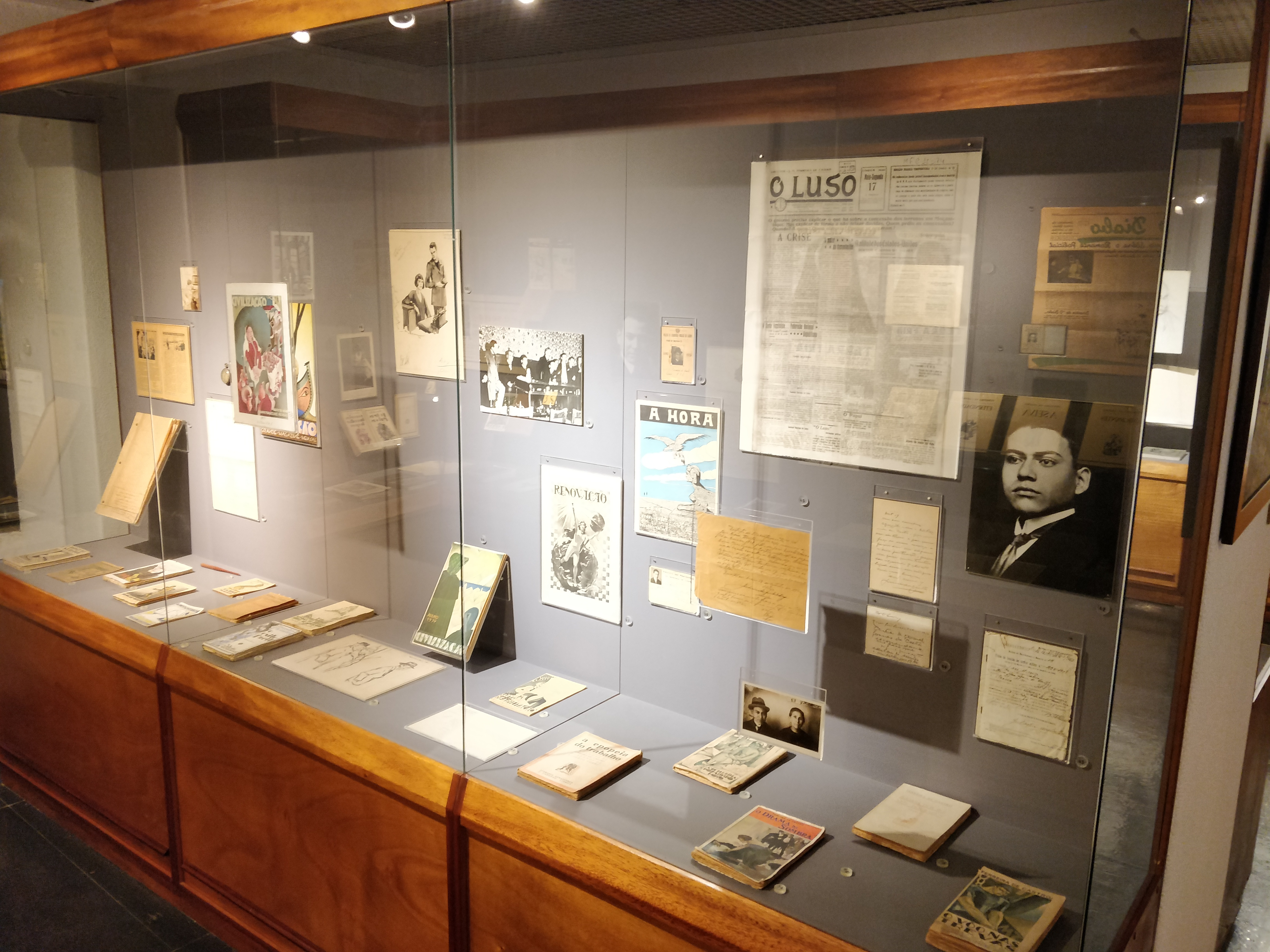
- Established: 1982; 44 years ago
- Location: Rua Consiglieri Pedroso 34, 2710-550 Sintra
- Coordinates: 38.7961°N 9.3926°W
- Website: https://cm-sintra.pt/atualidade/cultura/museus-municipais-de-sintra/museu-ferreira-de-castro

The Ferreira de Castro Museum is a museum in Sintra, Portugal devoted to the life of José Maria Ferreira de Castro, a Portuguese journalist and writer, who was buried in the hills overlooking the city. The museum is run by the municipality of Sintra and admission is free.

== Life of Ferreira de Castro ==
Ferreira de Castro's father died when he was eight. At the age of 12, in 1911, he decided to go to Brazil with the intention of supporting his family. Finding life difficult there he first worked on a rubber plantation on the banks of the Madeira River in the Amazon. In this time he began to write, publishing his first novel in 1916 and collaborating with friends to publish a weekly magazine in 1917.

In 1919 he returned to Portugal, virtually penniless, and succeeded in getting work from various newspapers. In 1926 he was elected president of the Lisbon Press Professionals' Union. This was shortly before the military coup that established the Estado Novo dictatorship. His reaction against censorship imposed by the Estado Novo led to the closure of the union a year later. He would remain a prominent critic of the dictatorship. Eventually he became editor of the daily newspaper, O Século. He became a well-known writer, with novels such as A Selva (The Jungle), his best-known, Emigrantes (Emigrants), Eternidade (Eternity), and Terra Fria (Cold Land), which won the Ricardo Malheiros Prize, in 1934, He also wrote several travel books.

In 1973 Ferreira de Castro devoted a large part of his intellectual estate to the city of Sintra.

I love that town deeply, for the immense poetry of Sintra's nature, where I meditated and dreamed so much, for its people who are such friends of mine, I did so because it was in Sintra that I wrote, for about thirty years, most of the work I produced in that long period, the most fruitful of my life.

He died in 1974 shortly after the Carnation Revolution of 25 April 1974, which overthrew the Estado Novo. Following his wishes, his remains were buried in the Sintra Mountains.

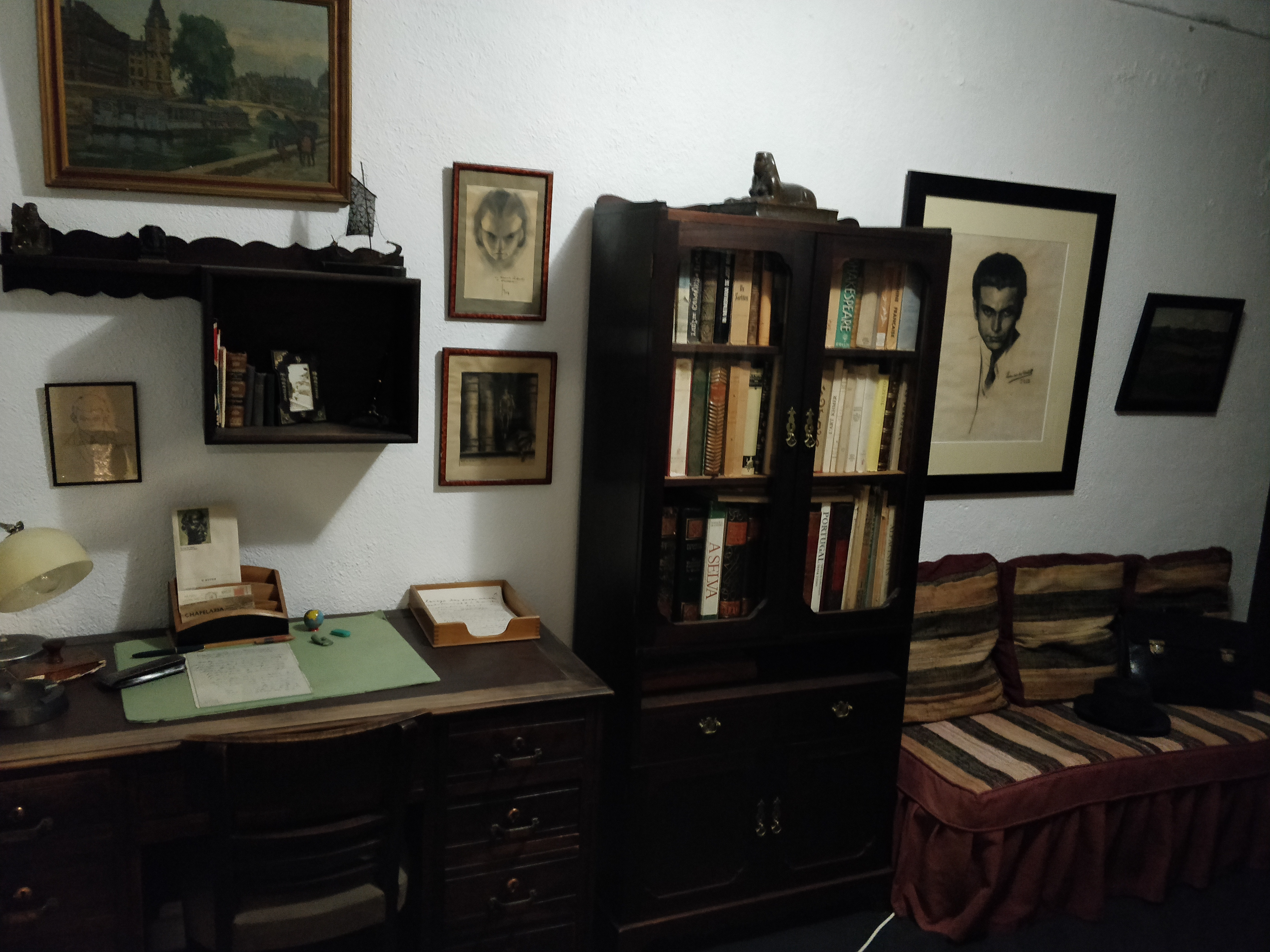
Recreation of Ferreira de Castro's study

== The museum ==
The Ferreira de Castro Museum is situated to the immediate west of the centre of Sintra, a UNESCO World Heritage Site. It is next to Lawrence's Hotel, the oldest still-functioning hotel in Iberia. The museum opened on 6 June 1982. It was subsequently closed for remodelling, re-opening on 22 July 1992. The writer's life is presented in chronological order, covering his early life, his emigration to Brazil, his return to Portugal and the subsequent development of his journalistic and writing career. Rare editions, translations of his work, manuscripts, personal objects, and original illustrations for his works can be seen. His study was reconstructed from items found in his home in Lisbon. There are also portraits of him by Eduardo Malta, Roberto Nobre, and Stuart Carvalhais, with sculptures by Anjos Teixeira and Júlio de Sousa.

Ferreira de Castro's collection consists of over 20,000 documents, including letters, periodicals, manuscripts, and photographs. These are accessible to researchers.
