= Casa-oficina António Carneiro =

House in Porto, Portugal

Coordinates: 41°8′58.69″N 8°35′37.93″W

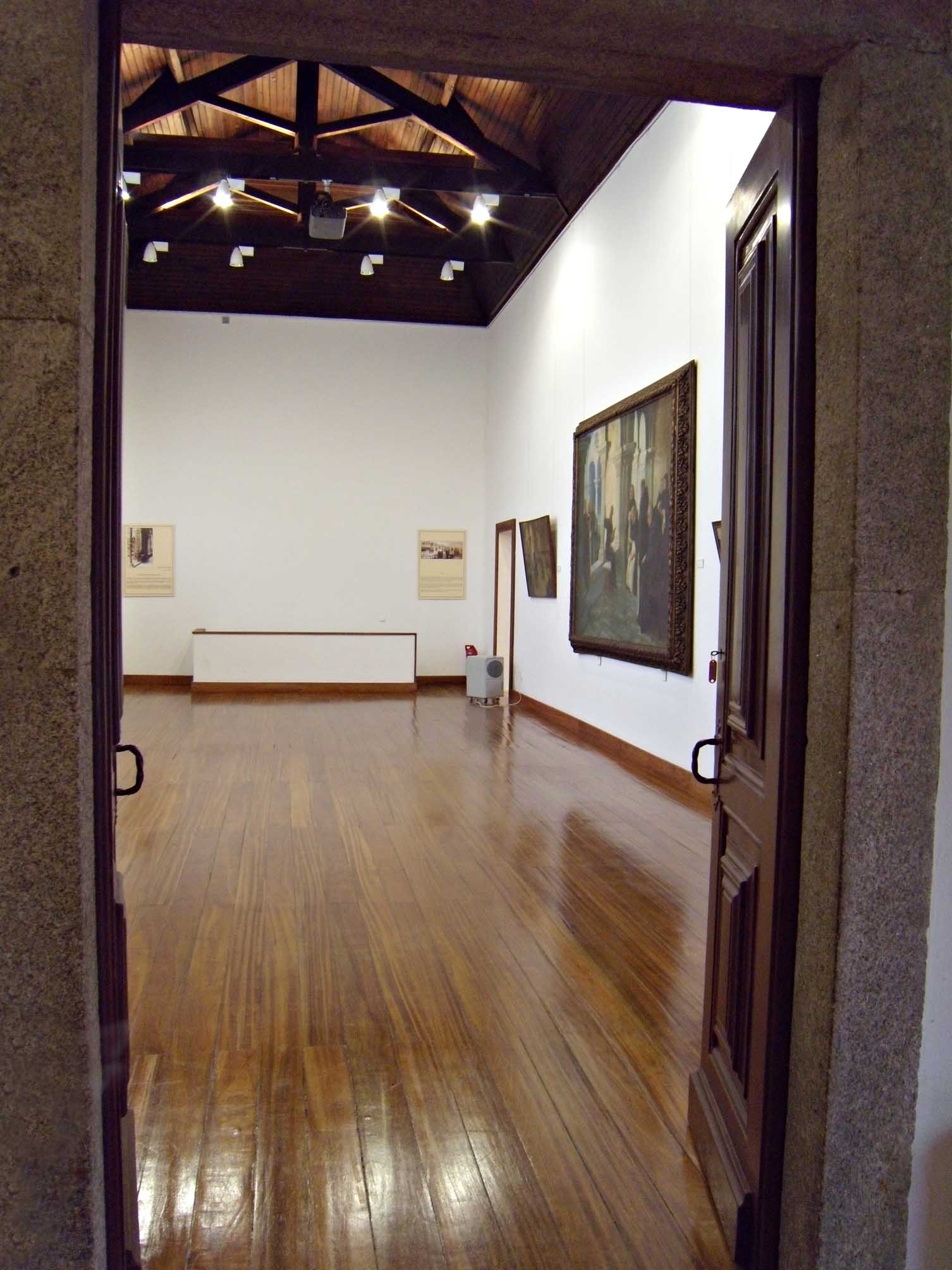
- Location: Bonfim, Porto
- Director: António Almeida
- Website: www.cm-porto.pt

The Casa-Oficina António Carneiro (António Carneiro's House-Workshop) is located in the city of Porto, Portugal.

== History ==
This house belonged to the Portuguese painter António Carneiro and was built in the 1920s. It served as both his residence and workshop. Later on, the same workshop was by his son, Carlos Carneiro, also a painter. Furthermore, his other son, Cláudio Carneyro, a Portuguese composer, also lived here.

After a period in which the house was closed to the public, the building was largely ignored and vandalized.
The House-Workshop reopened in 2009, now rehabilitated, with a temporary exhibition of some of the most relevant works of António Carneiro including "A Vida", "Camões" and the interiors of a few churches. The main purpose of this museum is to show work collection of António Carneiro.

== See also ==
- António Carneiro
