= Casa Vicent =

Vincent House
- Casa Vicent
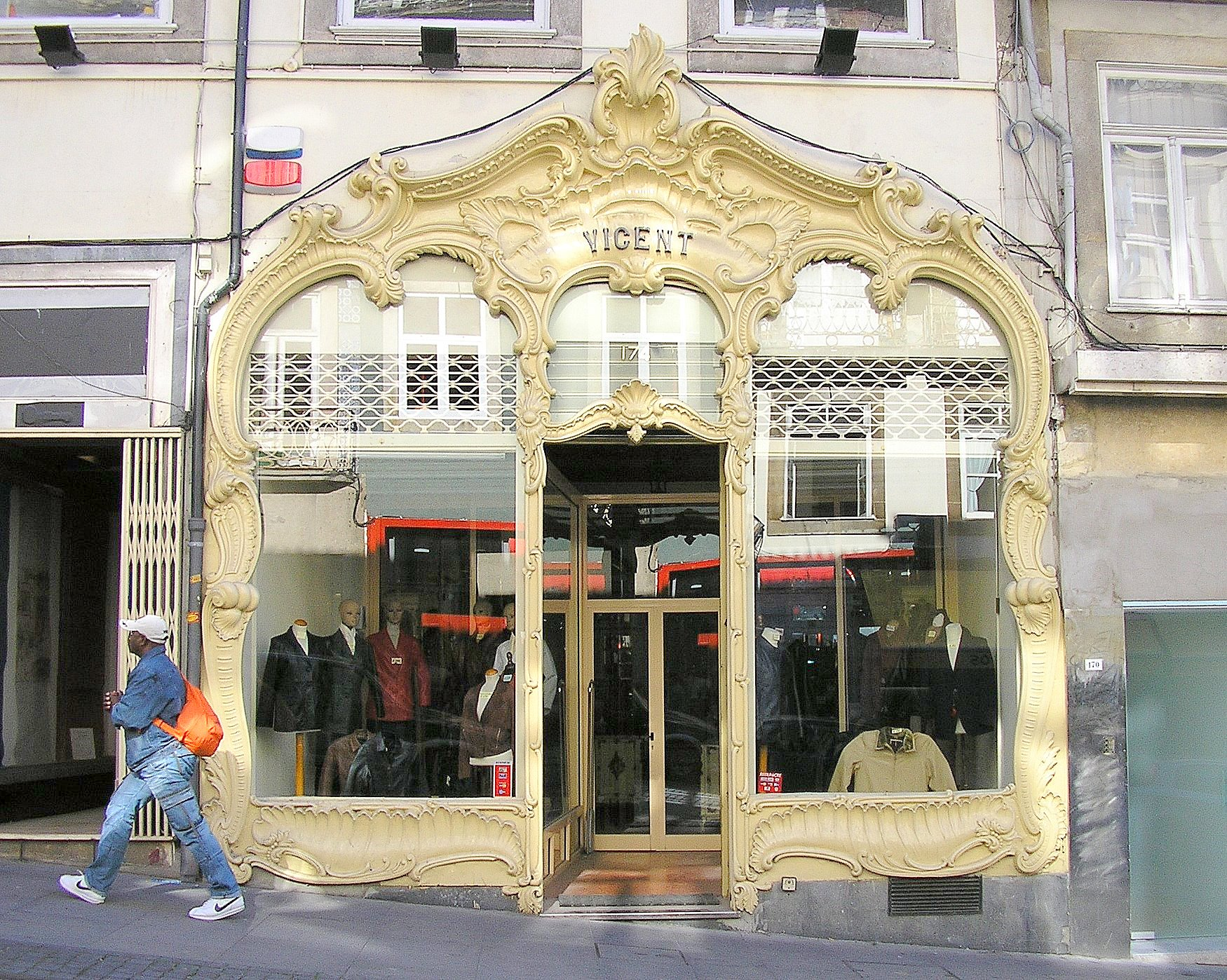
- The front facade of Casa Vicent, comparable to the front facade of the Café Majestic
- Interactive map of the Vincent House area

General information
- Type: Commercial Shop
- Architectural style: Rococo
- Location: Santo Ildefonso, Portugal
- Coordinates: 41°8′46″N 8°36′30″W
- Opened: 20th century

Technical details
- Material: Iron

Design and construction
- Architect: Companhia Aliança

Casa Vicent is a historic building in the civil parish of Santo Ildefonso, in the Portuguese city of Porto. Located in the historic lower town (Portuguese: Baixa), the shop is notable for the Art Nouveau and Rococo elements and undulating forms of its iron facade; it is similar to the facades of the Ourivesaria Cunha and Ourivesaria Reis along the same road, all constructed by the Companhia Aliança.

== History ==
At the beginning of the 20th century, Porto boasted several refined and well provided for cosmopolitan neighbourhoods, largely due to the development of the Port wine trade and the strong British influence upon the city.

As in the main European cities of the day, it was at the dawn of the 20th century that Porto experienced the blossoming of the Art Nouveau movement. Its architects tried to harmonize decorative expression with plants and flowers, often choosing commercial buildings and cafés for their work. New materials such as iron and glass evoked the power of industry and advances in science and technology since the previous century. Some examples of such emblematic buildings are the Café Majestic, the Ourivesaria Cunha (Goldsmiths) and Reis & Filhos, where techniques used with carved and chiseled silver were replicated with cast iron.

Founded in Porto around 1852, Companhia Aliança was established by the Baron of Massarelos and Gaspar da Cunha Lima. The Rua 31 de Janeiro became an important commercial artery, where many foreign merchants installed their businesses, including Vicent, Delage, Buisson, etc. The building's name came from the foreign occupant, who early on installed his business in the spaces, a Spanish merchant named Vicent.

Between 1914 and 1915, Companhia Aliança offered to the first occupants of the Casa Vicent several artifacts to Ourivesaria Miranda & Filhos.

On 24 August 1995, a dispatch was opened in order to begin the process to classify the property as patrimony. The classification process expired on 23 October 2009, under terms of article 78, decree-law 309/2009.

== Architecture ==
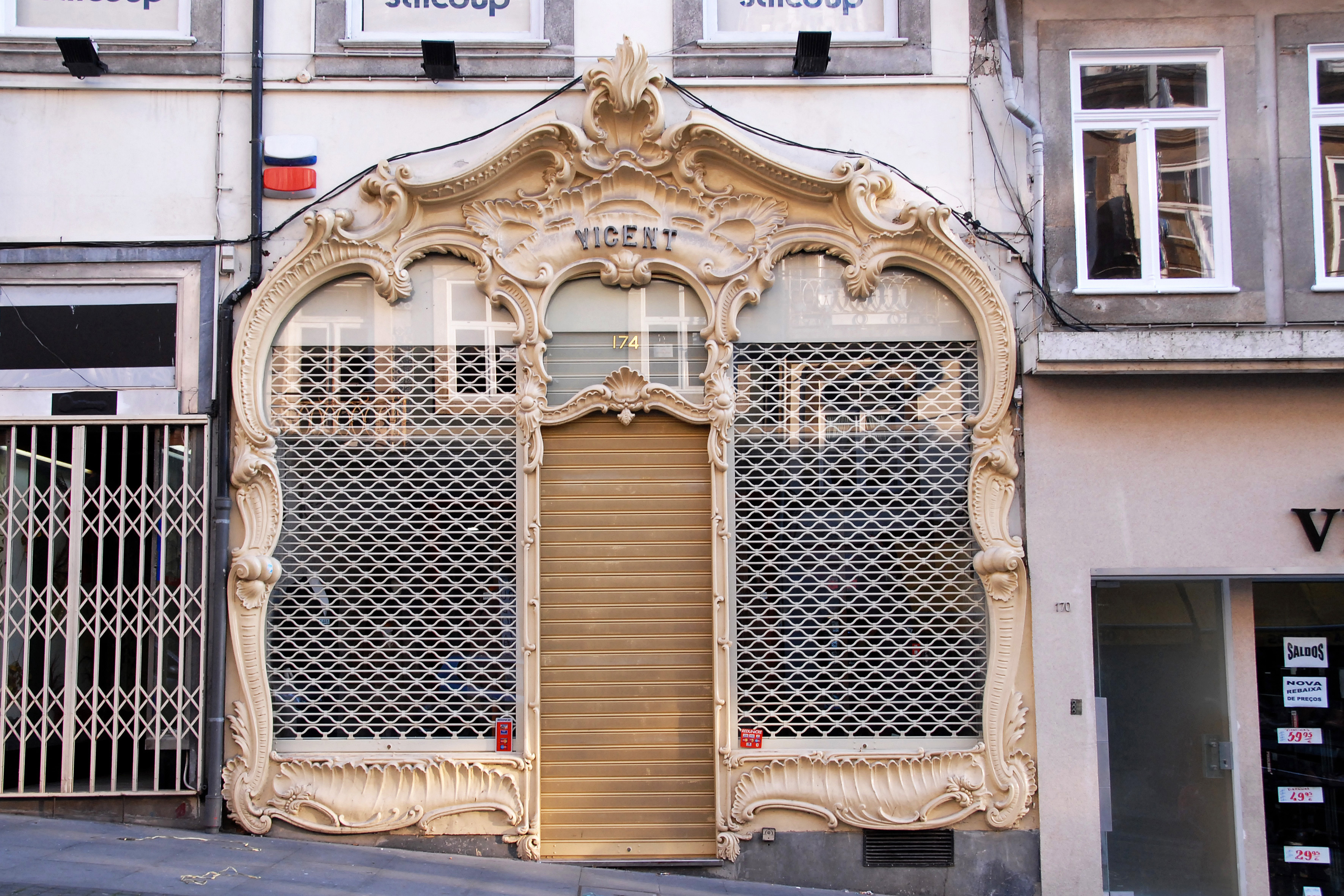
Grating covering the front facade of the Casa Vicent

Located in the urban expanse of Porto, it is flanked by several buildings that define the Rua 31 de Janeiro, a two-story building, constructed at the beginning of the 20th century. To the west of the building is a two-story structure, while a three-story building stands to the west; the rear of the building is aligned with the Rua da Madeira.

The principal facade is oriented to the south, along Rua 31 de Janeiro; a structure made of golden cast iron, with contours made up of a variety of ornate floral motifs. These are crowned with shell-like forms complemented by decorative plant designs of Rococo inspiration. It includes a central portico along its main axis, surmounted by flag, flanked by two large undulating frames. Its perimeter is constituted by large curved pieces, vegetal or shell-like in form, decorated in the center. Between the shell and door flag is a sign stating VICENT. The interior spaces still maintain the furniture and furnishings of the period including gilded counters, lamps and windows. Further notable features include the original wallpaper, decorated ceilings and wooden floors.

Casa Vicent constitutes one of the rare examples of ironwork commercial architecture referencing the Art Nouveau period. Similar styles were constructed along the same roadway, including the Ourivesaria Cunha and Ourivesaria Reis & Filhos. The ironwork is comparable the styles of these buildings in worked silver and polished metal.
