= Exiles Memorial Center =

- Espaço Memória dos Exílios
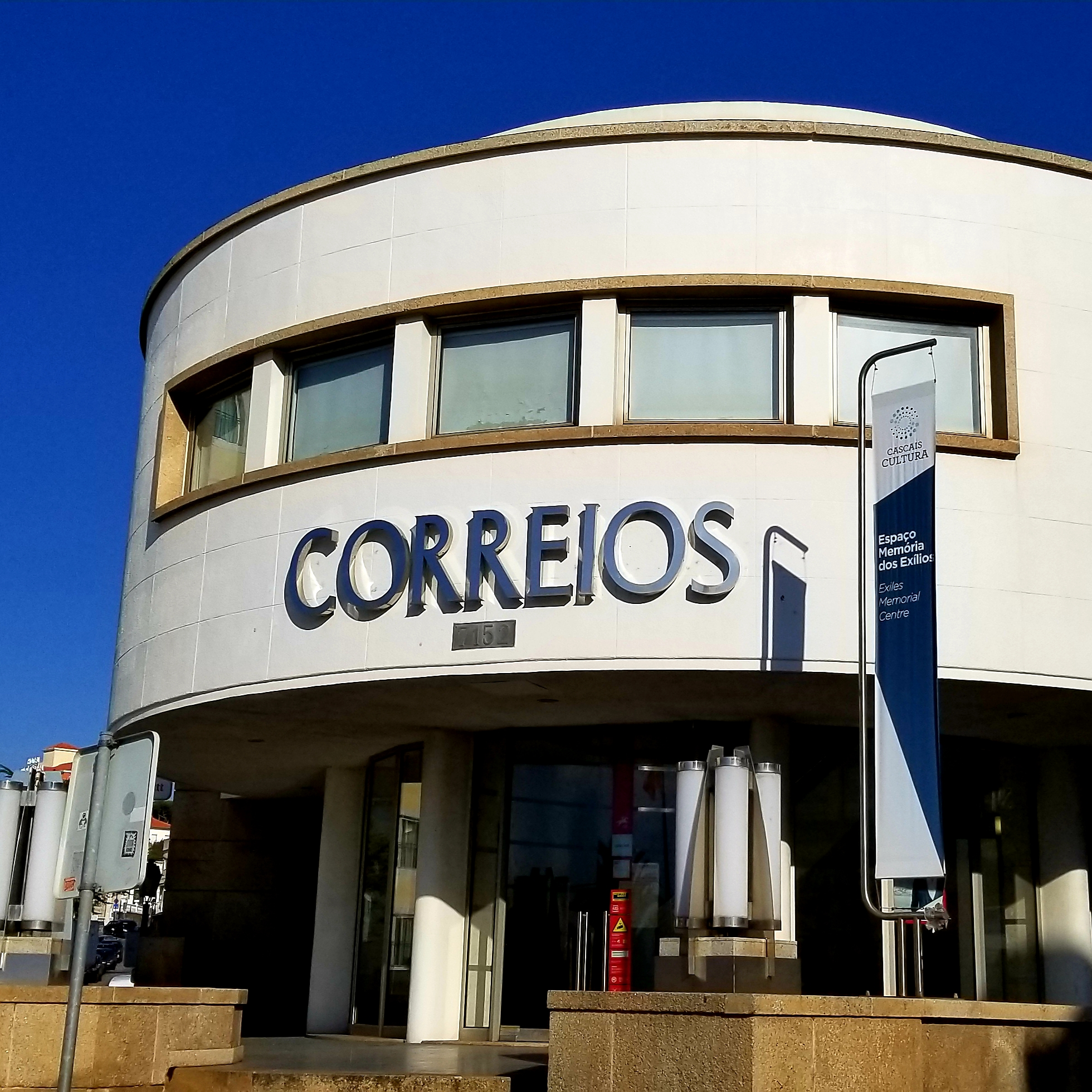
- Location: Av. Marginal 7152, Estoril, Portugal
- Coordinates: 38.70358°N 9.39626°W
- Public transit access: Estoril Station, Linha de Cascais

The Exiles Memorial Center (Portuguese: Espaço Memória dos Exílios) was located in Estoril, Portugal and housed a permanent exhibition of photographs, documentation and objects related to the history of refugees who stayed in the Cascais/Estoril area of Portugal during the period between 1936 and 1955. The Memorial Center, inaugurated in February 1999, was situated above the Estoril post office in a building designed by Portuguese architect Adelino Nunes. The building opened in 1942. The main objective of the Memorial Center was to "evoke the memory of one of the most important events in [Portugal's] history: to have represented a place of refuge, waiting and passage of thousands of exiles and refugees in the context of European conflicts" most notably during World War II. The Memorial Center was open to the public until its closure on 24 April 2023 by the city council. It is unknown at this time whether the closure will be permanent or whether the memorial space will be relocated.

== List of refugees ==
List (not exhaustive) of notable people who resided in Cascais by profession, place and duration.

=== Artists ===
- Jean-Claude van Itallie (playwright). Pensão Royal, 08.07.1940 – 28.09.1940.
- Franz Werfel (author, songwriter). Grande Hotel d'Itália, 18.09.1940 – 04.10.1940.
- Alma Mahler (author, songwriter). Grande Hotel d'Itália, 18.09.1940 – 04.10.1940.
- Max Ernst (painter, sculptor). Grande Hotel d'Itália, 12.06.1940 – 24.07.1940.
- Peggy Guggenheim (art collector). Grande Hotel d'Itália, 12.06.1940 – 24.07.1940.
- Margret Boveri (author, journalist). Hotel Atlântico, 16.01.1944 – 07.02.1944.
- Miloš Crnjanski (Milos Crujanski) (author). Hotel de Inglaterra, 19.05.1941 – 20.08.1941
- Max Ophüls (Max Ophuls) (director). Pensão de Luxo Casa Mar e Sol, 21.07.1941 – 1941.

=== Chess players ===
- Alexander Alekhine. Hotel Palácio, 18.01.1940 – 11.02.1940.

=== Industrial/Aviation/Engineering ===
- Paul-Louis Weiller. Grande Hotel Monte Estoril, 15.08.1940 – 23.08.1940; Hotel Atlântico, 23.08.1940 – 25.09.1940.

=== Models ===
- Aliki Diplarakou. Grande Hotel Monte Estoril, 15.08.1940 – 23.08.1940; Hotel Atlântico, 23.08.1940 – 01.10.1940.

=== Philosophers ===
- Isaiah Berlin. Hotel Palácio, 19.10.1940 – 24.10.1940.

=== Politicians ===
- Victor Bodson. Pensão Zenith, 30-08-1940 – 2.10.1940.
- Joseph Bech. Chalet Posser de Andrade, 2.10.1940 – 25.09.1940.
- Pierre Dupong. Chalet Posser de Andrade, 25.06.1940 – 25.09.1940.
- Jacques Stern. Hotel do Parque, 21.08.1940 – 01.09.1940.

=== Royalty ===
- Charlotte, Grand Duchess of Luxembourg (Grã-Duquesa Carlota do Luxemburgo). Casa Santa Maria and Chalet Posser de Andrade, 25.06.1940 – 03.10.1940.
- Prince Felix of Bourbon-Parma (Príncipe Félix de Bourbon-Parma). Casa Santa Maria and Chalet Posser de Andrade, 25.06.1940 – 10.07.1940.
- Jean, Grand Duke of Luxembourg (Príncipe herdeiro Jean do Luxemburgo). Casa Santa Maria and Chalet Posser de Andrade, 25.06.1940 – 10.07.1940
- Infanta Marie Anne of Portugal (Grã-Duquesa Marie-Anne do Luxemburgo). Casa Santa Maria and Chalet Posser de Andrade, 25.06.1940 – 10.07.1940.
- Princess Elisabeth, Duchess of Hohenberg (Princesa Elisabeth do Luxemburgo). Casa Santa Maria and Chalet Posser de Andrade, 25.06.1940 – 10.07.1940.
- Princess Marie Adelaide of Luxembourg (Princesa Marie Adelaide do Luxemburgo). Casa Santa Maria and Chalet Posser de Andrade, 25.06.1940 – 10.07.1940.
- Princess Marie Gabriele of Luxembourg (Princesa Marie Gabrielle do Luxemburgo). Casa Santa Maria and Chalet Posser de Andrade, 25.06.1940 – 10.07.1940.
- Prince Charles of Luxembourg (Príncipe Charles do Luxemburgo). Casa Santa Maria and Chalet Posser de Andrade, 25.06.1940 – 10.07.1940.
- Alix, Princess of Ligne (Princesa Alix do Luxemburgo). Casa Santa Maria and Chalet Posser de Andrade, 25.06.1940 – 10.07.1940.
- Duke and Duchess of Windsor. Home of Ricardo Espírito Santo, Cascais, 03.07.1940 – 31.07.1940.
- Umberto II (Umberto Nicola Tommaso Giovanni Maria di Savoia), last King of Italy, who lived in Cascais for 37 years. The building he occupied now forms part of the Grande Real Villa Itália hotel.

== See also ==
- Portugal during World War II
- Aristides de Sousa Mendes
- History of the Jews in Portugal
- Vilar Formoso Fronteira da Paz

== Audiovisual ==
- A YouTube playlist of conversations with former exiles.
