= Joaquim António Velez Barreiros =

Portuguese noble, diplomat, minister and soldier

- Born: November 25, 1802.
- Died: October 1, 1865 (aged 62)
- Other names: Viscount of Nossa Senhora da Luz
- Occupations: Soldier, minister of state, diplomat
- Known for: Role in developing Cascais as a summer resort

Joaquim António Velez Barreiros (1802–1865) was a Portuguese soldier, a minister of state and a prominent supporter of the liberal cause during the Portuguese Civil War. In 1853, he was made a Baron and in 1854 elevated to the title of Viscount of Nossa Senhora da Luz (Visconde de Nossa Senhora da Luz, better known as Visconde da Luz). He is also notable for his contribution to the growth of the town of Cascais as a popular summer resort.

== Early life ==
Barreiros was born on 25 November 1802 in São Julião da Barra, to the west of Lisbon, the capital of Portugal. After studying at the military academy, he became a soldier and was sent overseas in January 1823, returning to Portugal in September of that year. In July 1827 he was promoted to lieutenant.

== Civil War ==
Supporting the liberal cause in the Portuguese civil war, he joined the defenders of the island of Terceira in the Azores, where D. Pedro had set up a government in exile, later taking part in the taking of the islands of Pico, São Jorge, Faial and São Miguel by the liberals. He took part in the landing at Mindelo, north of Porto, which proved to be a decisive event in the war, and served during the Siege of Porto under the command of the Duke of Saldanha.

== Later career ==
Having risen to the rank of lieutenant colonel during the civil war, he was sent to Spain in November 1834, remaining until the end of 1837 and taking part in several battles against the Carlists, who were seeking the establishment of a separate line of the House of Bourbon on the Spanish throne. He was wounded at the Battle of Arlabán in 1836. While in Spain he met his wife, D. Rosa Montufar Infante, daughter of the 3rd Marques de Selva Alegre, and they married in Spain on 30 August 1837. She was a renowned beauty who in Lisbon would become the lover of the playwright and politician of Irish descent, Almeida Garrett, and is said to have inspired his poems published as Fábulas e Folhas Caídas (Fables and Fallen Leaves). They exchanged numerous love letters, some of which were preserved on Garrett's death.

In 1840 Barreiros went to London on behalf of the Portuguese government. Returning to Portugal in December 1843, he was put in charge of the general inspectorate of public works. In 1847, he was made a baron by Queen Maria II and in the same year he was promoted to brigadier and was briefly minister of foreign affairs. As a result of the Regeneration that followed the military insurrection of 1 May 1851 that led to the downfall of Costa Cabral, Barreiros became acting Minister of the Kingdom, Foreigners and the Navy, but shortly afterwards took over the functions of chief of staff of the commander- in-chief of the army together with those of director-general of public works. In 1854 he was elevated to a viscount by King Pedro V.

== Cascais ==
The town of Cascais, which is situated on the Atlantic to the west of Lisbon, has a street, a travessa (cross street) and a garden or park all named after the Visconde da Luz. In 1862, when Cascais was just a small fishing village, Barreiros decided to build a modern summer home there. He, together with some other distinguished residents, had agreed in 1860 to build a road between Cascais and Oeiras, which would effectively connect Cascais with Lisbon. This improved communication with Portugal's capital eventually attracted the Portuguese Royal Family to spend part of the summer in Cascais, which thus became the country's leading seaside resort. At the same time, the municipality agreed to fine all transport that failed to stay on the cobblestoned roads of the town. Trees were planted along the streets and the poles that were used to protect the growing trees were paid for by Barreiros.

== Death ==
Barreiros died in Lisbon on 1 October 1865.
