= Fernando Gonçalves =

Portuguese footballer

Gonçalves
Personal information
- Full name: Fernando Moreira Gonçalves
- Date of birth: 4 December 1967 (age 58)
- Place of birth: Cascais, Portugal
- Height: 1.75 m (5 ft 9 in)
- Position: Forward

Senior career*
Years	Team	Apps	(Gls)
1986–1994	Beleneneses	128	(26)
1994–1996	Estrela Amadora	39	(4)
1996–1997	Campomaiorense	24	(3)
1997–1999	Torreense	55	(10)
1999–2000	Atlético CP		

International career
1992	Portugal	1	(0)
- * Club domestic league appearances and goals

Fernando Moreira Gonçalves (born 4 December 1967, in Cascais) is a former Portuguese footballer. He played as forward. He began playing football professionally in 1986 and retired in 2000.
