= Palácio dos Condes da Guarda, Cascais =

Historic palace with a museum about the history of Cascais, Portugal

- Location within Portugal
- Established: August 2015; 11 years ago
- Location: Praça 5 de Outubro, Cascais, Portugal
- Coordinates: 38.6970°N 9.4208°W

The Palácio dos Condes da Guarda (Palace of the Counts of Guarda) is located in Cascais, Lisbon District, Portugal. The building now functions both as the headquarters of the Municipality of Cascais and, on the ground floor, as a museum that explains the history of the town.

== History of the building ==
The two-storey building dates back to the 18th century. It has since been enlarged by work carried out in the 20th century, particularly in 1918 when three separate buildings were joined together. The most distinctive feature of the building is the external use of decorative tiles of saints, specifically Saint Sebastian, Saint Anthony, Saint Martial, Saint Matthew, Mark the Evangelist, Saint Jerome, Luke the Evangelist and Saint John. These are considered to be the largest collection of such tiles ever applied to the facades of a single property. The oldest are believed to have been produced at the Real Fábrica de Louça do Rato in 1790. This was a ceramic factory in Lisbon that was founded by the Marquis of Pombal and, between 1767 and 1835, pioneered the manufacture of modern pottery, particularly tableware, in Portugal.

The interior of the building, although much altered, also has some elements from the original structure, namely the entrance patio with vaulted roof and the access staircase and landing to the first floor, which is decorated with tiles from the end of the 18th century. On the first floor there are decorations in neo-baroque style. Archaeological work carried out in 1992 in the area of the main entrance revealed traces of occupation by fishing communities between the 13th and 17th centuries with the land believed to have been used for manufacture and repair of nets.

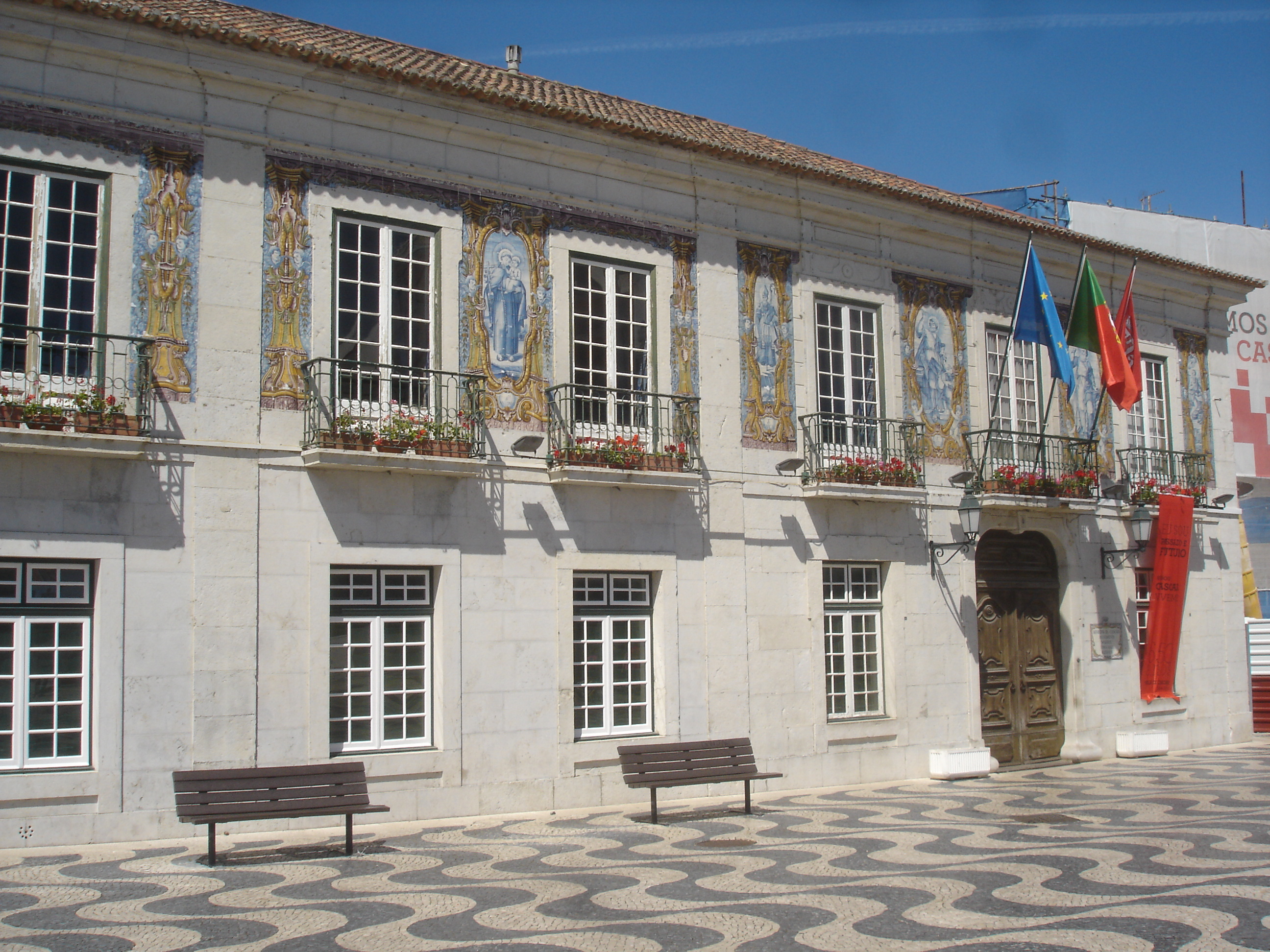
The front of the building

The first written information about the existence of the palace dates back to the end of the 18th century during the Napoleonic Wars when the house was chosen by the governor of Cascais to house the British Navy Admiral Sir Charles Cotton. In 1810, the property was sold to João Lopes Calheiros de Menezes, who settled there. In 1860, when one of his heirs received the title of the first Count of Guarda the house became known as the Palácio dos Condes da Guarda. In 1918 the building was acquired by the lawyer Herlander Ribeiro who had plans to use it as a hotel and casino. However, these plans failed to eventuate and in 1932 the building was sold to the Municipality of Cascais.

== The museum ==
The small museum is divided into five thematic areas, illustrating the main moments of the history of the region. It includes items from prehistory up to a set of photographs from 1900 that show the first steps in the transformation of a fishing village into an important town. The Museum also uses some innovative multimedia techniques.
