= Palácio dos Condes de Castro Guimarães =

Historic summer house in Cascais, Portugal built by the O'Neill family. Now a museum

Condes de Castro Guimarães Museum
- Established: 1931; 95 years ago
- Location: Av. Rei Humberto II de Itália, Cascais, Portugal
- Coordinates: 38.6920°N 9.4214°W

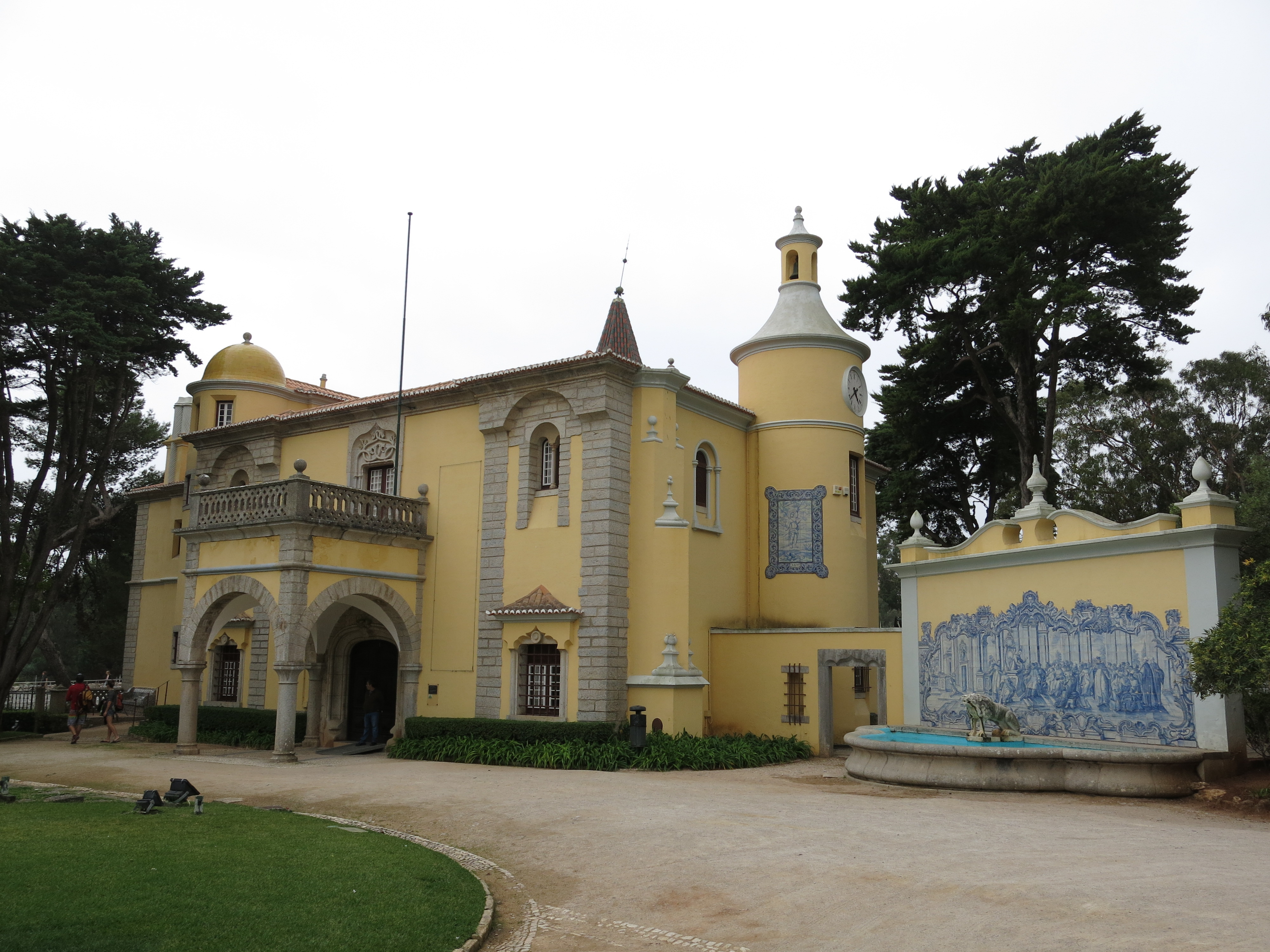
Back view

The Palácio dos Condes de Castro Guimarães, originally known as the Torre de São Sebastião (St Sebastian's Tower), was built in 1900 as an aristocrat’s summer residence in Cascais, Lisbon District, Portugal. It became a museum in 1931. The building follows an eclectic architectural style, while the museum includes paintings of national and international significance, furniture, porcelain, jewellery and a neo-Gothic organ.

== History ==
Jorge O'Neill built the Torre de São Sebastião in 1900, to the designs of Francisco Vilaça. O'Neill was a Portuguese aristocrat of distant Irish descent who had multiple business interests including Portugal's match monopoly. The nearby Casa de Santa Maria was also constructed at his behest.

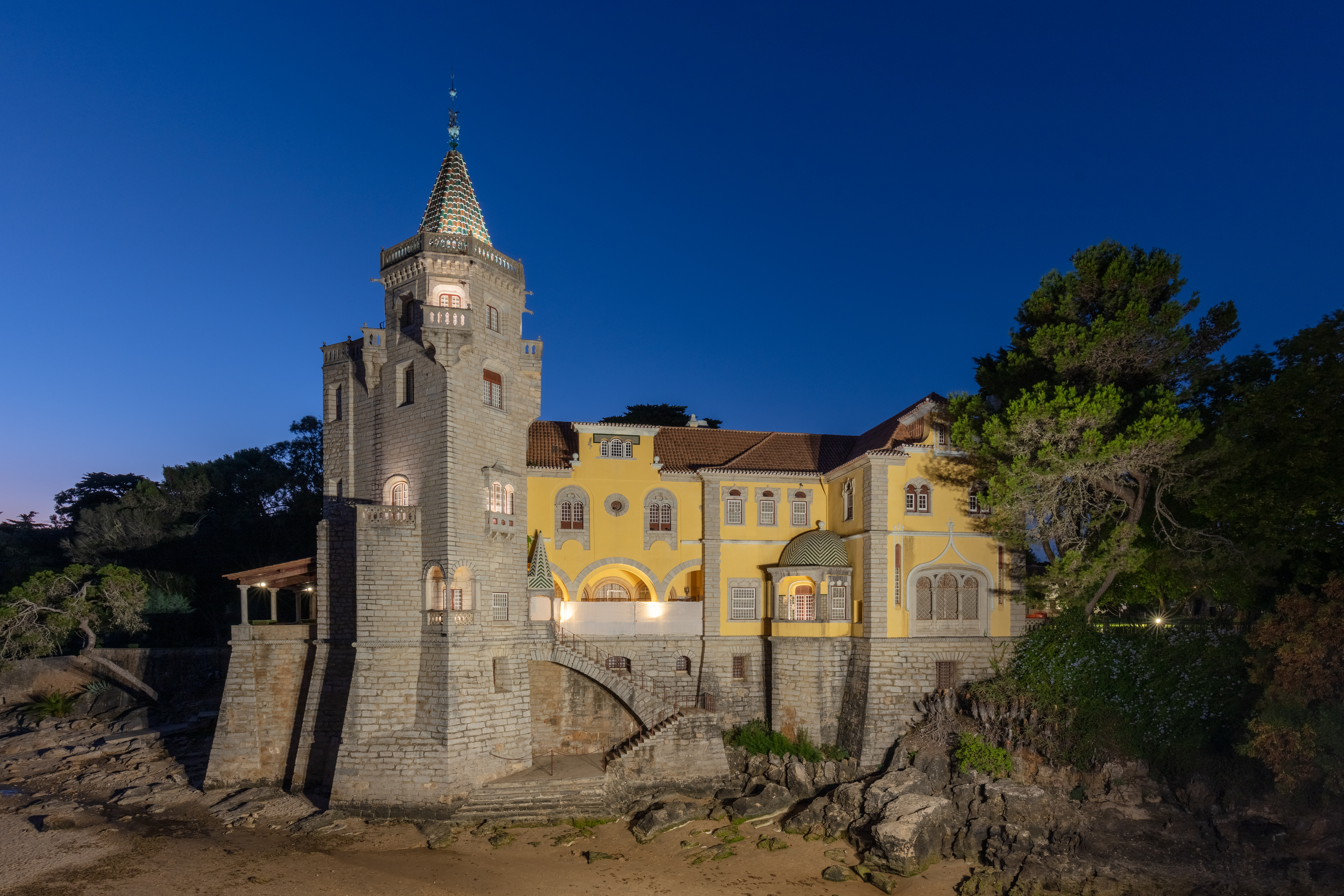
Night view

The building employs several architectural styles, adopting a Revivalist approach that includes Neo-romanticism, Neo-Gothic, Neo-Manueline and Neo-Moorish. The overall impression is of a medieval castle. References to O'Neill's Irish heritage can also be found scattered throughout the building, particularly in the so-called Shamrock Room.

The building's most striking feature is the tower, the base of which juts out into a small cove. The house has an irregular rectangular plan, in two, three and four floors, with several main and triple windows. There are several gargoyles, protruding eaves and porches. The interior is built around a quadrangular cloister. The main rooms are intercommunicating and have beamed ceilings with floors in ceramic tiles with Polychromatic patterns, as well as some tiled walls. Almost all rooms also have tiled stoves, some of which were brought from other buildings.

In 1910 the house was sold to the 1st Count of Castro Guimarães who, with his wife, lived there until 1927. Many of the pieces now in the museum were acquired during that period. Notable were the purchases of a neo-Gothic organ, built for the Count, and rare 16th Century manuscripts including the valuable "Chronicle of Don Afonso Henriques", the first king of Portugal, written by Duarte Galvão (1446-1517).

The Count died in 1927, donating the house and its garden to the state, with the request that the house be used as a museum and art gallery. The Condes de Castro Guimarães Library Museum was inaugurated on July 12, 1931, and for many years was the only museum in Cascais. Directors have included João Couto, Carlos Bonvalot, Branquinho da Fonseca and Maria Alice Beaumont. In 1932, the famous Portuguese writer, Fernando Pessoa, applied for the position of curator, but was turned down for lack of qualifications.
