= Cascais Marina =

Marina in Cascais, Portugal

Coordinates: 38.693°N 9.418°W

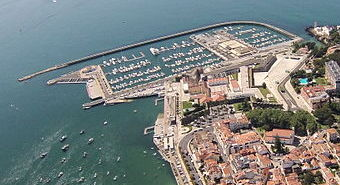
- Aerial view of the Cascais Marina.
- Click on the map for a fullscreen view

Location
- Country: Portugal
- Location: Cascais, Portuguese Riviera
- UN/LOCODE: PTCAS

Details
- Type of harbour: Artificial
- No. of berths: 650 mooring stations

Statistics
- Website; Official website

The Cascais Marina, in Cascais, Portugal, is the largest marina on the Portuguese Riviera and the third largest marina in the country.

Located on the Bay of Cascais along the shore of the Citadel of Cascais, the marina plays host to numerous high profile sailing events, such as the America's Cup World Series, the World Match Racing Tour, and the Audi MedCup. In 2018, the city announced the marina will be redeveloped, featuring a €60 million green roofs scheme, that when complete would be a mixed-use luxury and environmentally conscious destination.

== History ==
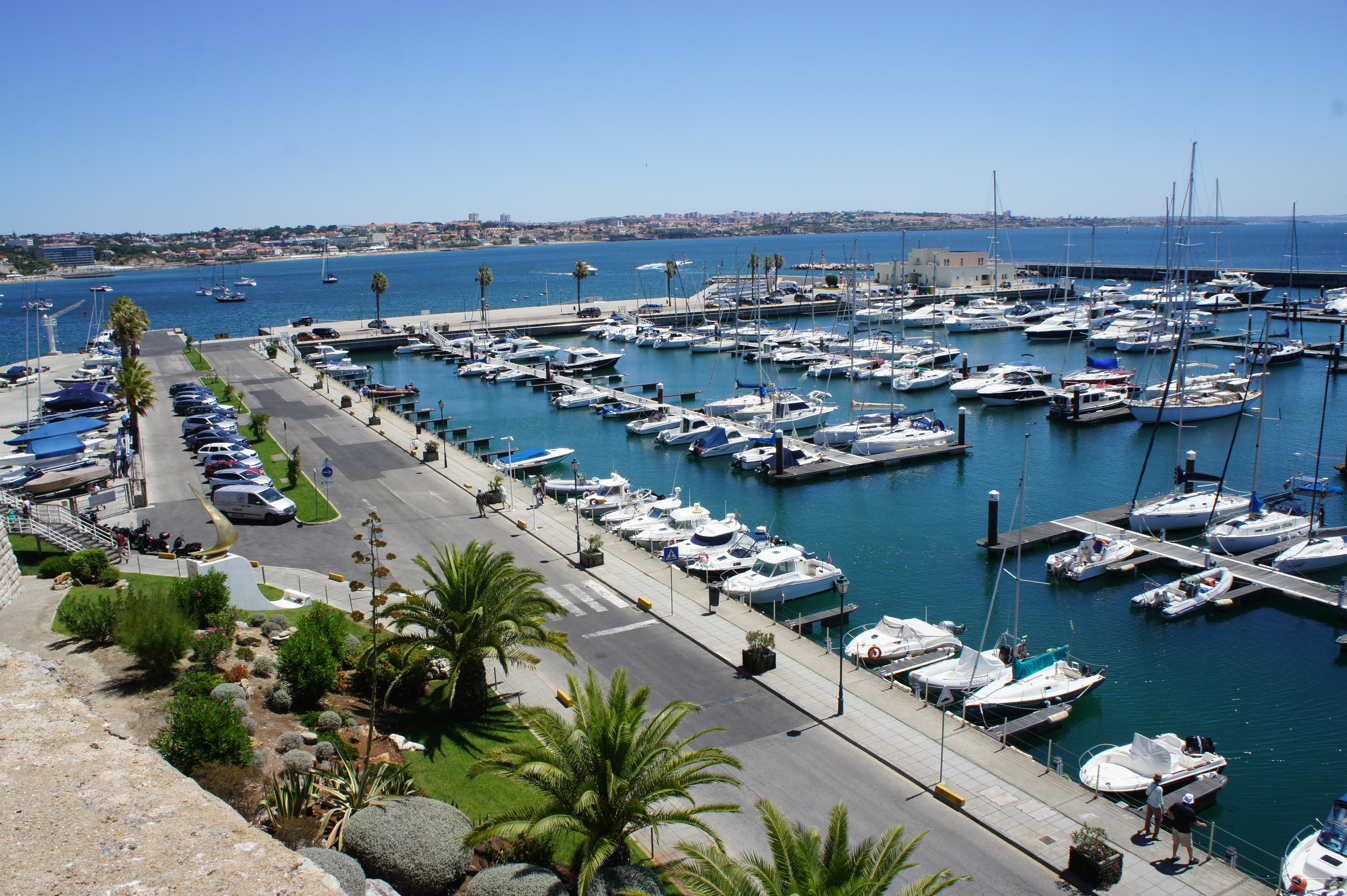
Cascais Marina has over 650 mooring stations, 125 of which are reserved for short stopovers.

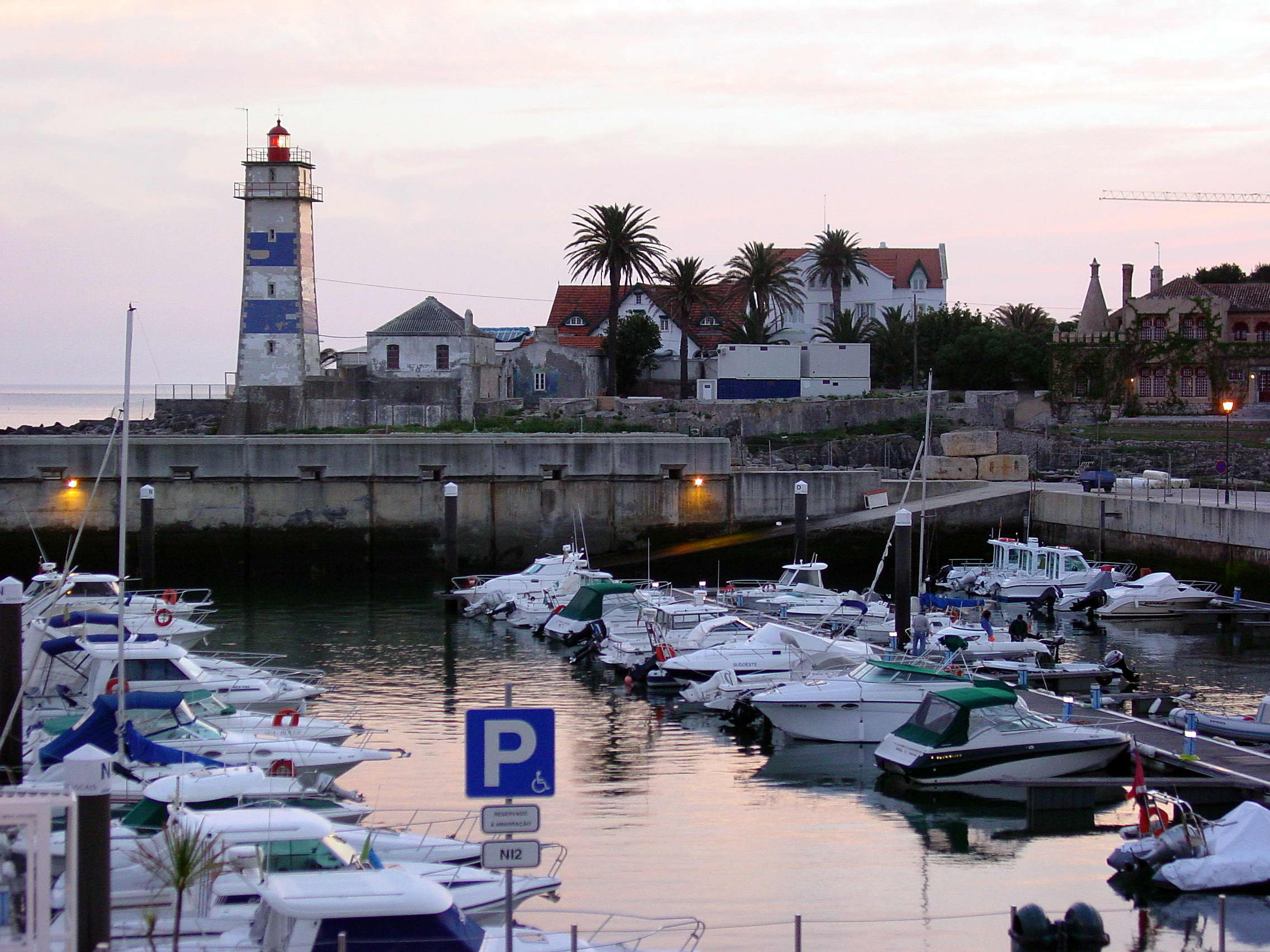
View of Santa Marta Lighthouse from the marina.

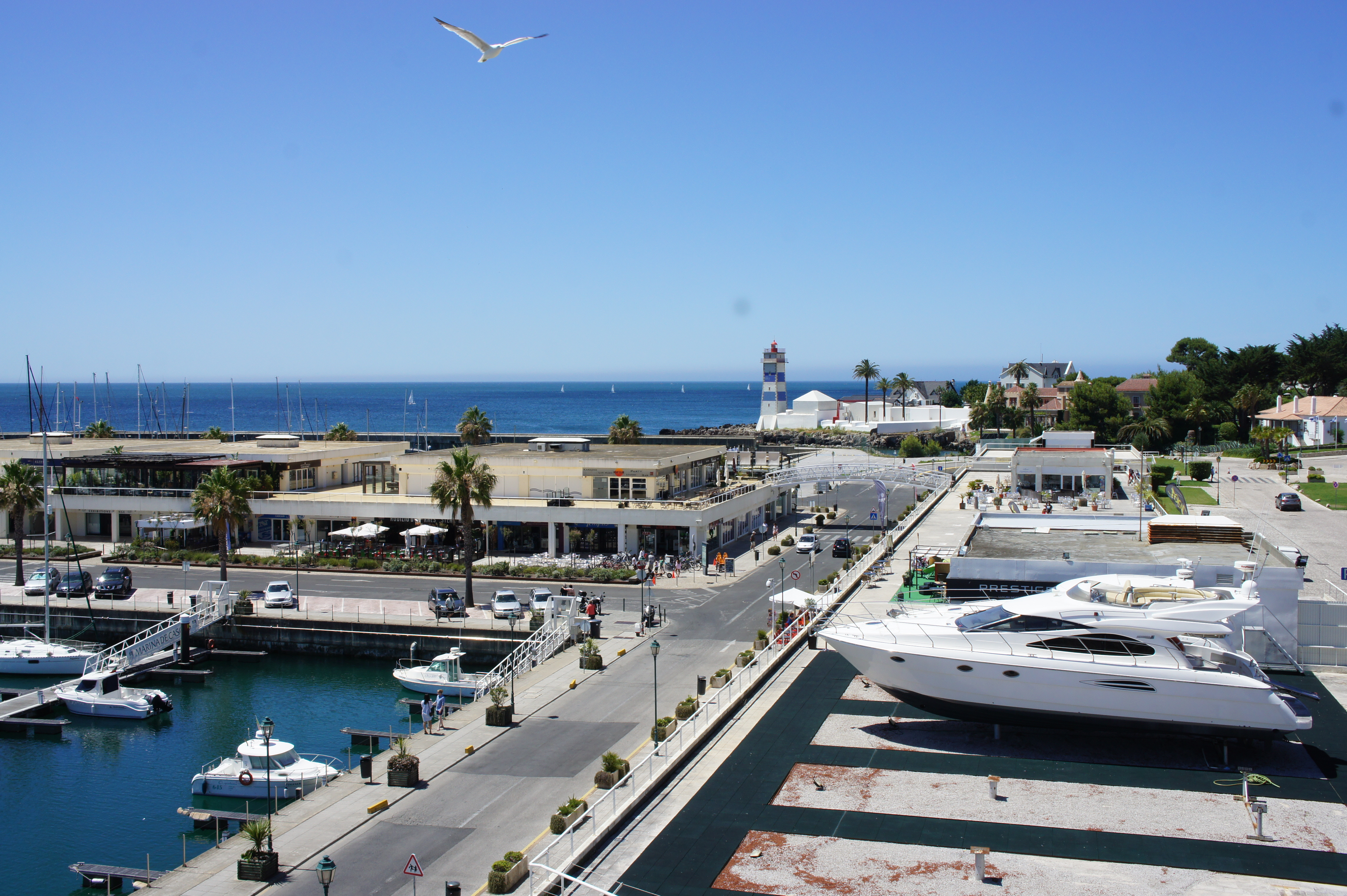
The marina has over 20,000 m2 of entertainment space, regularly hosting luxury and high profile events.

The Marina was planned both as a base for boats cruising the coast and wanting to visit Lisbon as well as for the boats of the local inhabitants, for which there were inadequate moorings in Cascais. The concession for the construction and operation of the marina was awarded for 75 years to a private company, by contract with the Portuguese State, on September 21, 1995.

There were considerable criticisms of the development. These centered on the potential environmental impact; the change to the nature of the landscape; and the difficulty in predicting the behavior of the currents, especially with regard to the deposit of sand, potentially forming new beaches and removing others. Such fears came, in part, to be realised, particularly in regard to the visual impact of the marina on the cove of Santa Marta, and the Casa de Santa Maria and the Santa Marta Lighthouse on the cove’s banks. In addition, it has been argued that the chosen architectural model collides with that of the old walls of the Citadel, situated immediately above the marina and that the commercial areas of the marina, such as shops and restaurants, are unattractive and should be rebuilt. Proponents of the marina argue that it has not affected the visual appeal of Cascais, that all the surrounding historical and architectural heritage was preserved and carefully integrated, and that it has led to further regeneration of the area, particularly in the citadel.

== Organization ==
Cascais Marina has 650 mooring stations able to receive vessels up to 36 meters in length. Of these berths, 125 are reserved for short stopovers. The marina was officially opened on 6 August 1999. It has a total area available for events of 20,000m2 of open, multi-use spaces and has hosted several important sailing events, such as the America’s Cup World series, the Swedish Match Tour, the Audi MedCup (2010 and 2011), the 2007 ISAF Sailing World Championships, and the 49er & 49er FX World Championships. The marina is also used for non-sailing events, such as the Ironman 70.3.
