= Casa de Santa Maria, Cascais =

Building in Cascais, Lisbon District, Portugal

Casa de Santa Maria
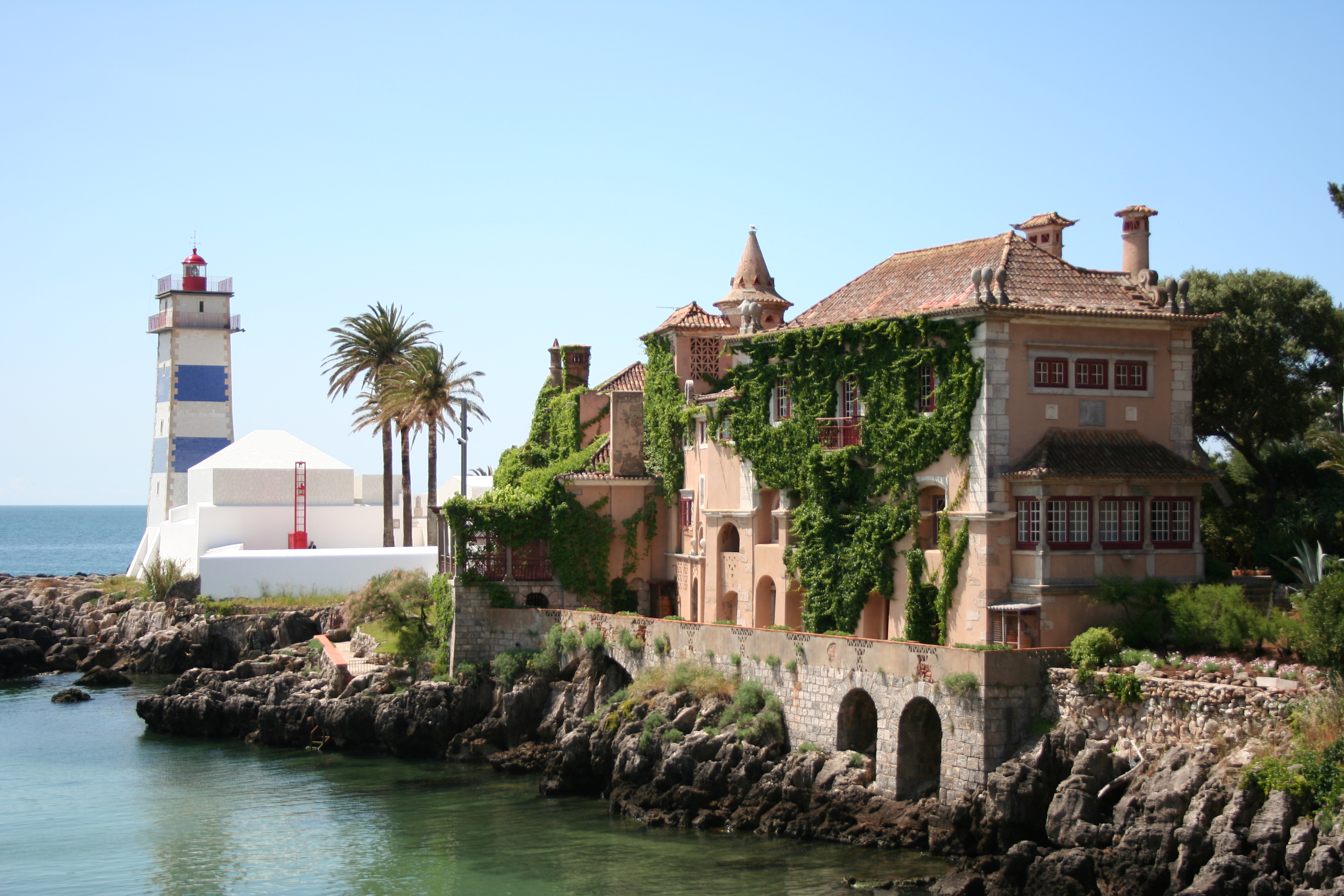

- Location within Portugal
- Established: 1902; 124 years ago
- Location: Cascais, Portugal
- Coordinates: 38.6912°N 9.42133°W

The Casa de Santa Maria (House of Saint Mary) is a historic house museum in Cascais, Portugal, located on the Portuguese Riviera. Designed by famed architect Raul Lino, Casa de Santa Maria is a notable exemplar of both Portuguese Summer architecture and Lino's Casa Portuguesa school.

== History ==
In the late 19th century, Jorge O'Neil, an aristocrat with many business connections, purchased some land near the Santa Marta area of Cascais. He first had built what is now the Condes de Castro Guimarães Museum and, a little later, commissioned the Casa de Santa Maria as a wedding present for his daughter. This dates from 1902 and was designed by the architect Raul Lino, who began his career in Cascais, designing a series of houses for friends. In the case of Santa Maria, he was instructed to disregard the popular styles of the time and design the house using only materials found within Portugal. The eventual design was heavily influenced by the Moorish style of construction, which had shaped many of Portugal's finest buildings. This influence is most visible inside the building, with horseshoe arches connecting the central rooms.

Around 1914, the property was sold to the engineer José Lino Júnior, the older brother of Raul Lino, the architect. Lino, a major collector and art lover, purchased, from an old chapel in Frielas, a set of 17th century Azulejo tiles and a wooden oil-painted ceiling, which has been attributed to António de Oliveira Bernardes. He expanded the building by adding parts at each end, with the work also being designed by Raul Lino.

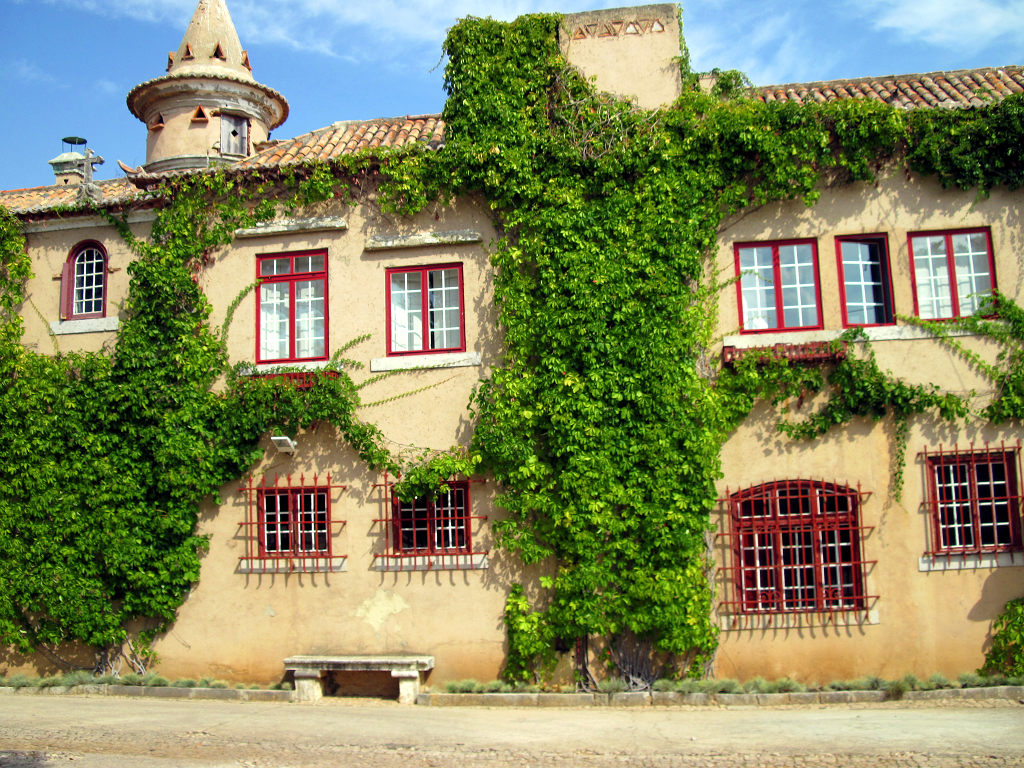
A view from the front of the house

In 1934, the house was acquired by the Espírito Santo family, who received famous visitors such as Charlotte, Grand Duchess of Luxembourg, King Umberto II of Italy, and the Duke and Duchess of Windsor. Other visitors to the house have included the former US President, Richard Nixon.

== Contents ==
The house can now be visited from Tuesdays to Sundays. It has no movable artefacts but contains a rich collection of tiles and painting, primarily from the Portuguese Baroque. On the ground floor the walls of the rooms are covered with polychrome blue and yellow painted tiles, originally from the Marvila Convent in Lisbon. On the first floor, the Chapel contains tiled narrative scenes from the Virgin Mary's life, produced in Talavera, Spain at the end of the 16th Century. Floral motifs painted on the ceiling are by Raul Lino. Next door is the Great Hall with a painted ceiling and tile-lined walls. The basement contains avant-garde painted tiles from around 1920, also designed by the architect.
