= Judite Teixeira =

Portuguese writer

Judith Teixeira
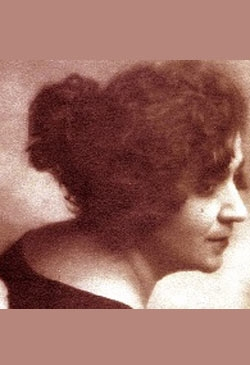
- Born: Judite Teixeira; 25 January 1880; Viseu, Portugal
- Died: 17 May 1959 (aged 79); Lisbon, Portugal
- Occupations: writer, publisher
- Writing career
- Language: Portuguese

Judith Teixeira (25 January 1880 - 17 May 1959) was a Portuguese writer. She published three books of poetry and a book of short stories, among other writings. In 1925, she founded the magazine Europa, of which three issues were published (April, May and June). Her book Decadência (1923) was seized, along with the books of António Botto and Raul Leal, by the Civil Government of Lisbon as a result of a campaign led by the conservative Liga de Acção dos Estudantes de Lisboa (Action League of the Students of Lisbon) against "decadent artists, poets of Sodom, the publishers, authors and sellers of immoral books." She disappeared from public life in 1927, dying in Lisbon in 1959.

== Biography ==
Judith Teixeira was born on 25 January 1880 in Viseu, and was baptized on February 1 of the same year, in the Viseu cathedral, as the natural daughter of Maria do Carmo; the name of the father was not included in the certificate of baptism. In 1907, she was recognized as the legitimate daughter of Francisco dos Reis Ramos, an ensign in the infantry. At the time, she resided in Lisbon, at number 70 of Rua do Arco do Carvalhão, with Jaime Levy Azancot, a Sephardic Jewish businessman.

On 3 August 1908, she married Jaime Levy Azancot, with whom she lived with in Rua Rodrigo da Fonseca. On 8 March 1913 the marriage was dissolved, the wife being accused of adultery and abandonment of the conjugal domicile. On 22 April 1914 in Bussaco, she married Álvaro Virgílio de Franco Teixeira, 26, a lawyer and industrialist. In 1931, Álvaro Teixeira initiated divorce proceedings but withdrew due to insufficient evidence. He died on September 9, 1937, of arteriosclerosis, without a will.

Judith Teixeira was the lover of the writer and feminist Maria Olga de Moraes Sarmento da Silveira, who is mentioned in the Azancot divorce proceedings. Another woman, Júlia de Moraes Sarmento, is also mentioned.

It was in her forties, between 1922 and 1927, that Teixeira published all her books and directed the magazine Europa. Due to the lesbian themes of some of her poems, she was violently attacked in the conservative and moralist press for "sexual shamelessness" and "ignoble doggerel". In 1927, she was absent from Portugal, as indicated by a note inserted at the end of her short-story collection Satânia, the last book she published.

She died on 17 May 1959 at age 79. At the time of death, she resided in Lisbon, at number 3 of Praceta Padre Francisco, Campo de Ourique. According to her death certificate, she died a widow, was childless, owned no property, and did not leave a will.

== Selected works ==
- Decadência. Poemas (1923)
- Castelo de Sombras. Poemas (1923)
- Nua. Poemas de Bizâncio (1926)
- De Mim. Conferência (1926)
- Satânia. Novelas (1927)
