= Alice Lawrence Oram =

Portuguese journalist and translator

- Photo of Oram taken inside Aljube prison in Lisbon
- Born: 1864; Lisbon, Portugal
- Died: 1948 (aged 83–84); Sintra, Portugal
- Occupation: Journalist
- Known for: Lisbon-based correspondent for English-language media

Alice Lawrence Oram (1864 – 1948) was a British journalist and translator living in Portugal. As a journalist, she broke the news overseas of the 5 October 1910 revolution that overthrew the Portuguese monarchy.

== Early life ==
Alice Lawrence Oram was born in 1864 in Lisbon. Her parents, William Oram and Jane Lawrence, were the owners of Lawrence's Hotel in Sintra, reputedly the oldest still-functioning hotel on the Iberian Peninsula, which became famous as a place where, in 1809, Lord Byron wrote part of his work Childe Harold's Pilgrimage. It was also featured in novels by the Portuguese writer, José Maria de Eça de Queirós, as being the place to stay when people from Lisbon visited nearby Sintra. At an early age, Oram was meeting many of the writers and artists of Portugal who visited the hotel.

== Career ==
Oram became a correspondent for a wide variety of foreign news agencies and papers, such as the Associated Press, Reuters and the British Daily Mail, often using the pseudonym of Célia Roma, with which she signed short stories and poems that appeared in several newspapers and magazines. For the Daily Mail she prepared a report on the 5 October 1910 Republican revolution in Portugal, which was the first news of the event to be released abroad. Anecdotally, she walked around Lisbon under gunfire in order to get full details of the story.

Oram had a home in Lisbon close to the Palace of the Dukes of Palmela, which gave her a privileged position to watch the movements of Lisbon's elite before the Revolution and the protests held in the nearby Largo do Rato after the event. In 1912 she was arrested for alleged participation in a conspiracy to restore the monarchy. Her arrest attracted overseas coverage, including in the New York Times. The period after the overthrow of the monarchy was one of great political and social instability, marked by daily riots, attacks and explosions. This environment led many people to be jailed on suspicion of participating in pro-monarchist or counter-revolutionary movements, often with little evidence. Oram was accused of promoting political meetings aimed at restoring the monarchy. She was briefly held at the Aljube women's prison in the centre of Lisbon, often being released and then re-arrested. Her trial was held together with that of another women, Constança Teles da Gama, who had been accused of feeding troops loyal to the monarchy who were, according to her, held under starvation conditions. The trial, which became a cause célèbre in Lisbon, quickly collapsed. Oram freely admitted to having been in contact with royalists but explained that this was necessary for her work as a journalist. Searches of her house in Lisbon, and her parents' home in Sintra revealed nothing to incriminate her.

In May 1916, Oram accompanied Virgínia Quaresma, the first Portuguese woman to be a professional journalist and a noted feminist and lesbian, on a trip on a submarine, which included a dive. The voyage, on NRP Espadarte ("Swordfish"), the first modern submarine in the Portuguese navy, was said to have been the first trip by female reporters in a submarine, at least in Portugal. Towards the end of her life, she was involved with the first press agency in Portugal, Lusitânia. The agency was established by Luís Caldeira Lupi who wanted to create a news agency that would connect the entire Portuguese-speaking world.

Alice Lawrence Oram died in Sintra on 7 September 1948. She was buried in the British Cemetery, Lisbon. Before her death she had become a naturalized Portuguese.

== Publications ==
Oram translated several works into Portuguese, including Oliver Twist by Charles Dickens, and works by Gabriele D'Annunzio, and Freeman Wills Crofts. She also translated into English O Livro das Crianças (The Children's Book) by António Botto, a best-selling collection of short stories for children that would be officially approved as school reading in Ireland.
