= Maria Luísa de Sousa Holstein, 3rd Duchess of Palmela =

Portuguese artist and charity founder

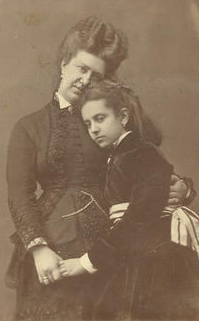
- The Duchess of Palmela with her daughter
- Born: Maria Luísa Domingas Eugénia Ana Filomena Josefa Antónia Francisca Xavier Sales de Borja de Assis and Paula de Sousa Holstein; 4 August 1841; Lisbon, Kingdom of Portugal
- Died: 2 September 1909 (aged 68); Sintra, Kingdom of Portugal
- Occupations: Sculptor; watercolour painter
- Years active: 40
- Known for: Establishment of charity to supply food to the poor of Lisbon
- Notable work: Sculpture of Diogenes

Maria Luísa de Sousa Holstein, 3rd Duchess of Palmela (4 August 1841 – 2 September 1909) was a member of the Portuguese nobility who became known for her sculptures, which were exhibited at the Paris Salon, as well as for her charitable work, which included the establishment of soup kitchens for the poor of Lisbon.

== Early years ==
Maria Luísa Domingas Eugénia Ana Filomena Josefa Antónia Francisca Xavier Sales de Borja de Assis and Paula de Sousa Holstein was born on 4 August 1841, in Lisbon, in the Palace of the Dukes of Palmela. She had blonde hair and blue eyes, presumably inherited from Maria Anna Leopoldina von Schleswig-Holstein-Sonderburg-Beck, the grandmother of the first Duke of Palmela. She attended a school in France, where the daughters of the European aristocracy received a religious education taught by nuns, but also had classes in fine arts, and visits to museums, monuments and concerts.

In what was the Lisbon society wedding of the year, in April 1863 she married D. António de Sampaio e Pina de Brederode, the second son of the Viscount of Lançada, who was a soldier who had volunteered for the British army and fought in the Crimean War (1853–56). On the death of her father in 1864 three years after her mother's death, she became the Duchess of Palmela and her husband became the 3rd Duke. At the age of 24, the new Duchess was in control not only of a vast fortune but also an artistic heritage consisting of the family's many properties and the numerous works of art they contained.

== Artistic work ==
Appreciated as a sculptor, she was also a significant patron of the arts, both by awarding scholarships and financial grants and by commissioning and buying works of art to modernize the already notable Palmela collection. She started her artistic career soon after the birth of her two children, D. Helena Maria Domingas in 1864, and D. Pedro Maria Luís Eugénio in 1866. Important initial influences were Victor Bastos of Portugal’s Academy of Fine Arts in Lisbon, which had been founded in 1836, and the Frenchman, Célestin-Anatole Calmels, an artist of the Romantic school who had arrived in Lisbon in 1858. Calmels painted and sculpted the Palmela family and in 1865 and 1866 worked with the Duchess on the redesign of the late-18th-century Palmela palace in Lisbon, continuing to provide works of art for the palace until the turn of the century. He was also responsible for the decoration of a summer house that the Duke and Duchess built in Cascais at the time when the royal family were spending part of their summers there.

De Sousa Holstein's artistic training was not just restricted to formal lessons by Bastos and Calmels. Affluent, cosmopolitan, and enlightened, she surrounded herself with some of the most respected artists of the time. She was a friend of the actresses Sarah Bernhardt, who visited Lisbon in 1895, and Eleonora Duse. In the field of sculpture, she worked in Paris with Auguste Rodin and Jean-Baptiste Claude Eugène Guillaume. Guillaume sculpted a bust of her in 1889.

With a favourable reception at her first two showings in Lisbon, the Duchess exhibited at the 1878 Exposition Universelle (1878) in Paris, possibly using her connections to secure a place. Exhibiting at the annual exhibitions of the "Society for the Promotion of Fine Arts" (Sociedade Promotora das Belas-artes-SPBA) as well as at smaller exhibitions of paintings often held in Lisbon's bookshops, she continued to gain favourable comment for her sculptures and watercolours. The writer Ramalho Ortigão said that she was "no longer a simple amateur, a dilettante, but an artist in the most beautiful sense of the word", and the journalist Rangel de Lima noted that "the art of sculpture in Portugal can, therefore, be exalted for having among its cultivators such a noble and distinguished amateur in the works to which she connects her name". Her first presentation at the Salon of the Société des Artistes Français in Paris was in 1884, where her sculpture of Diogenes was very favourably received. It became sufficiently popular to be subsequently reproduced in smaller versions in brass.

While her works received considerable acclamation, the willingness of a member of the nobility to put in the hard work required to reach a stage of competence that, were she poor, would have enabled her to live on her work was often commented on. Some observers were suspicious and gave her the nickname of the "Duchess of Calmels", implying that her teacher Célestin-Anatole Calmels had more to do with the production of the works of art than just her training. Others disagreed, noting that her work was too "feminine" to have been helped by Calmels. She remained unaffected by the criticism and her work as a sculptor was finally recognized by Portugal with the award of the Order of Santiago (Portuguese: Ordem Militar de Sant'Iago da Espada) in 1909, the year of her death. The order is awarded for exceptional and outstanding merit in literature, science, and the arts. While many female painters emerged in Portugal in the second half of the 19th century, De Sousa Holstein remained the predominant Portuguese woman sculptor of the time.

== Charitable work ==
At the end of the 19th century, Lisbon had many poor people and the streets were full of beggars, particularly children. The Duchess of Palmela, together with Maria Isabel de Lemos Saint-Léger, Marchioness of Rio Maior, thought of promoting an institution that would serve meals, at reasonable prices, to the most deprived sections of the population. They decided to form the "Society to Promote Economic Kitchens" (Portuguese: Sociedade Promotora das Cozinhas Económicas). With the support of several other aristocratic families, banks and other donors guaranteed, the Duchess of Palmela visited Switzerland and England to see how such charitable organizations operated. On her return she ordered, at her own expense, all necessary equipment, including kitchen utensils, ovens, tables and chairs, and cutlery. She also arranged for some Sisters of Charity to travel to Lisbon from France to run the operation. The first soup kitchen opened on 8 December 1893, an important day for the Catholic Church as it is the Feast of the Immaculate Conception. Seven other Economic Kitchens were to follow. The first meal consisted of a bowl of grain soup with rice, stewed cod, 200 g (7 oz) of bread, and a glass of wine. Subsequent meals did not include wine. King Carlos I of Portugal often contributed food, such as animals shot during his hunts and surplus fish caught by the royal yacht Amélia IV.

In her life, the Duchess of Palmela had become such an important and well-known personality that when people in Lisbon spoke of "the Duchess" everyone knew who they were talking about, even though there were many others with the same title. Following the assassination of King Carlos in Lisbon on 1 February 1908, she remained in seclusion. The final exhibition of her art was in Rio de Janeiro, Brazil in the same year. She died on 2 September 1909, at her farm in Sintra, of angina pectoris at the age of 68. The Society for the Promotion of Economic Kitchens continued after the Duchess's death and would eventually pass to the control of the Santa Casa da Misericórdia de Lisboa, a Portuguese charity connected to the Catholic Church.
