= Bernardo Pinheiro Correia de Melo =

Portuguese noble, writer and soldier

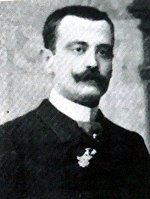
- Born: 27 May 1855; Guimarães, Kingdom of Portugal
- Died: 21 May 1911 (aged 55); Vila Nova de Famalicão, Portuguese Republic
- Occupation: Writer/Government Official/Soldier
- Writing career
- Pen name: Bernardo Pindela

Bernardo Pinheiro Correia de Melo, first Count of Arnoso, (1855 –1911), was a Portuguese writer and personal secretary to King Carlos.

== Early life ==
Bernardo Pinheiro Correia de Melo was born in Guimarães, Portugal on 27 May 1855. He was the second son of João Machado Pinheiro Correia de Melo, 1st Viscount of Pindela, and of Eulália Estelita de Freitas Rangel de Quadros. At the age of seven he was sent to the Portuguese capital of Lisbon to stay with family friends and study at the English College, a school attached to a Catholic monastery. He studied mathematics at the University of Coimbra, completing his studies at the Army School. He joined the army in November 1871, eventually reaching the rank of Brigadier General in 1908. For much of the time he was Chief Officer of the Royal House under Kings D. Luiz I and King Carlos.

== Career ==
In 1887, he was appointed Secretary of the Extraordinary Embassy of Portugal to the Imperial Court of Beijing. He took the opportunity to visit many places, both in China and during his journeys there and back, including Egypt, Singapore, Macau, Hong Kong, Shanghai, Tianjin, Japan and the United States. Using the pseudonym of Bernardo Pindela, his impressions were initially published in the Revista de Portugal, founded and directed by the novelist José Maria de Eça de Queirós and, later, in a volume entitled Jornadas pelo Mundo (Journeys around the World), published in Porto, by Livraria Magalhães & Moniz, in 1895. Correia de Melo also wrote for other magazines such as A Imprensa, A Semana de Lisboa, and Brasil-Portugal.

Correia de Melo was appointed to be the personal secretary of King Carlos and for this work was made the first Count of Arnoso, in 1895. He accompanied D. Carlos I on visits to France, Germany and Spain and was part of the official delegation for the funeral of Queen Victoria in London. He also accompanied Prince D. Luís Filipe to London for the coronation of Edward VII. He was made a member of the Chamber of Most Worthy Peers in 1901.

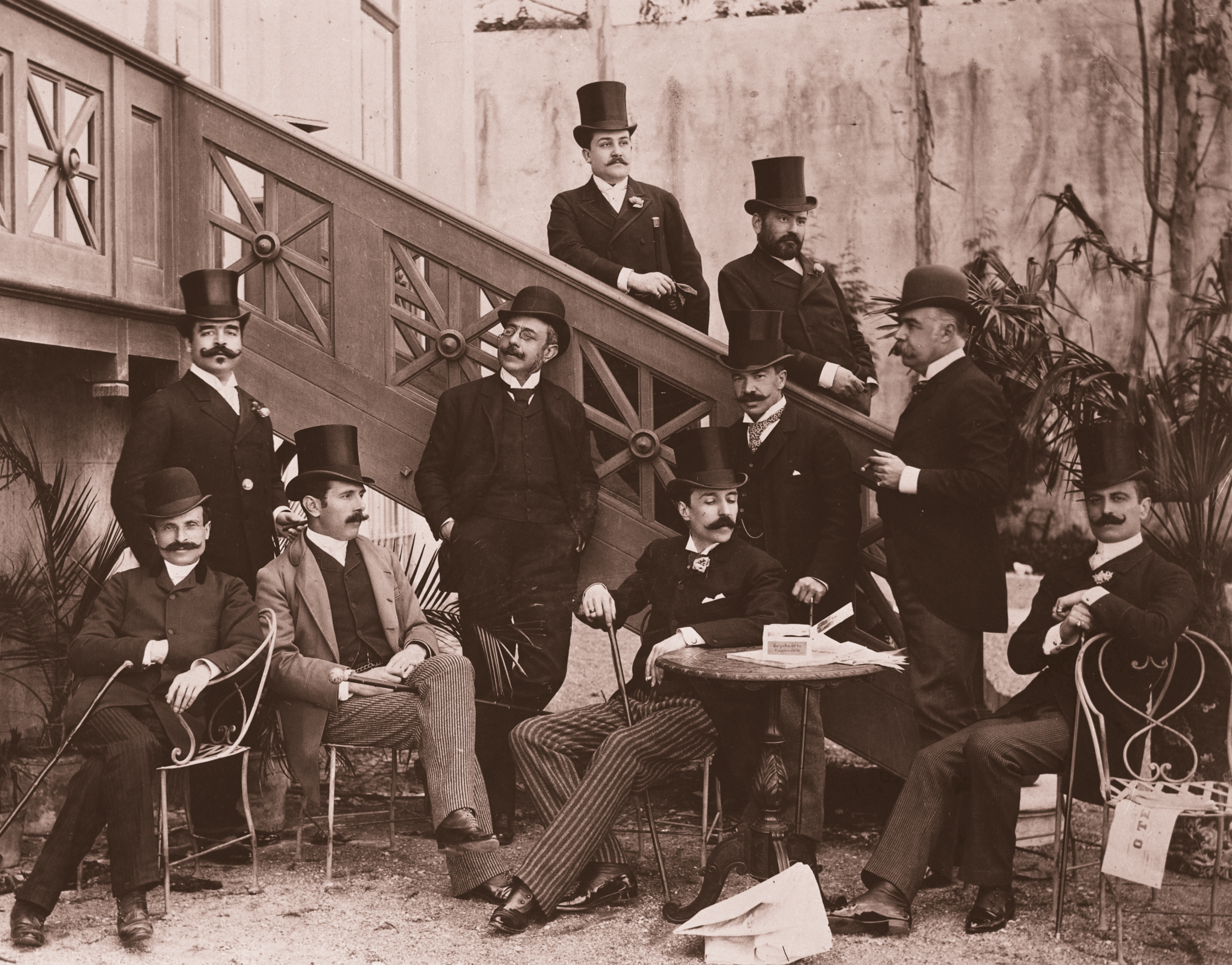
The Vencidos da Vida. The Count of Arnoso is seated on the right

He became a member of the Vencidos da Vida (Life's Vanquished), a group of aristocratic intellectuals, which included the writers Eça de Queirós and Ramalho Ortigão, who had strived to modernise the country in their youth but by the late 1800s perceived that they had failed. Correia de Melo hosted some of the meetings of the Vencidos de Vida, including at his summer home in Cascais, known as Casa de São Bernardo, which, based on traditional houses in the Minho Province where he was born, is considered to be a good example of what is known in Portugal as summer architecture. A close friend of Eça de Queirós, he presented a bill to Parliament in 1901 to grant a pension to his widow and children. He also organised a statue in Lisbon in memory of the author.

== Retirement from public life and death ==
After the Lisbon Regicide in 1908, when King Carlos and Prince Luís Filipe were killed, and the declaration of a Republic in 1910, Correia de Melo withdrew from public life, returning to his house near Vila Nova de Famalicão. He died there on 21 May 1911. He is remembered by a statue in Guimarães and by a bust in the gardens of the library of Vila Nova de Famalicão.

== Publications ==
Correia de Melo's publications were:

- Azulejos (1886), with a preface by Eça de Queirós.
- De Braço Dado (Arm in Arm - 1894) in collaboration with his brother-in-law the Count of Sabugosa.
- Jornadas pelo Mundo, 1895. Companhia Portugueza Editora, Porto. (Published in the name of Count of Arnoso).
- O Talisman (1897)
- A Primeira Nuvem (The First Cloud – 1902), play.
- O Suave Milagre (The Mild Miracle – 1902), in collaboration with Alberto de Oliveira, an adaptation of a short story by Eça de Queirós, for which he was rewarded by King Carlos with one of his own watercolours, depicting a scene from the play.
- Elogio do Conde de Ficalho (In Praise of the Count of Ficalho -1903).
- Vila Viçosa, a chapter of Art and Nature in Portugal, 1904.
- Justice! His speech to Parliament following the Regicide, 1909.
