= Chalet Ficalho =

19th century summer residence in Cascais, Portugal

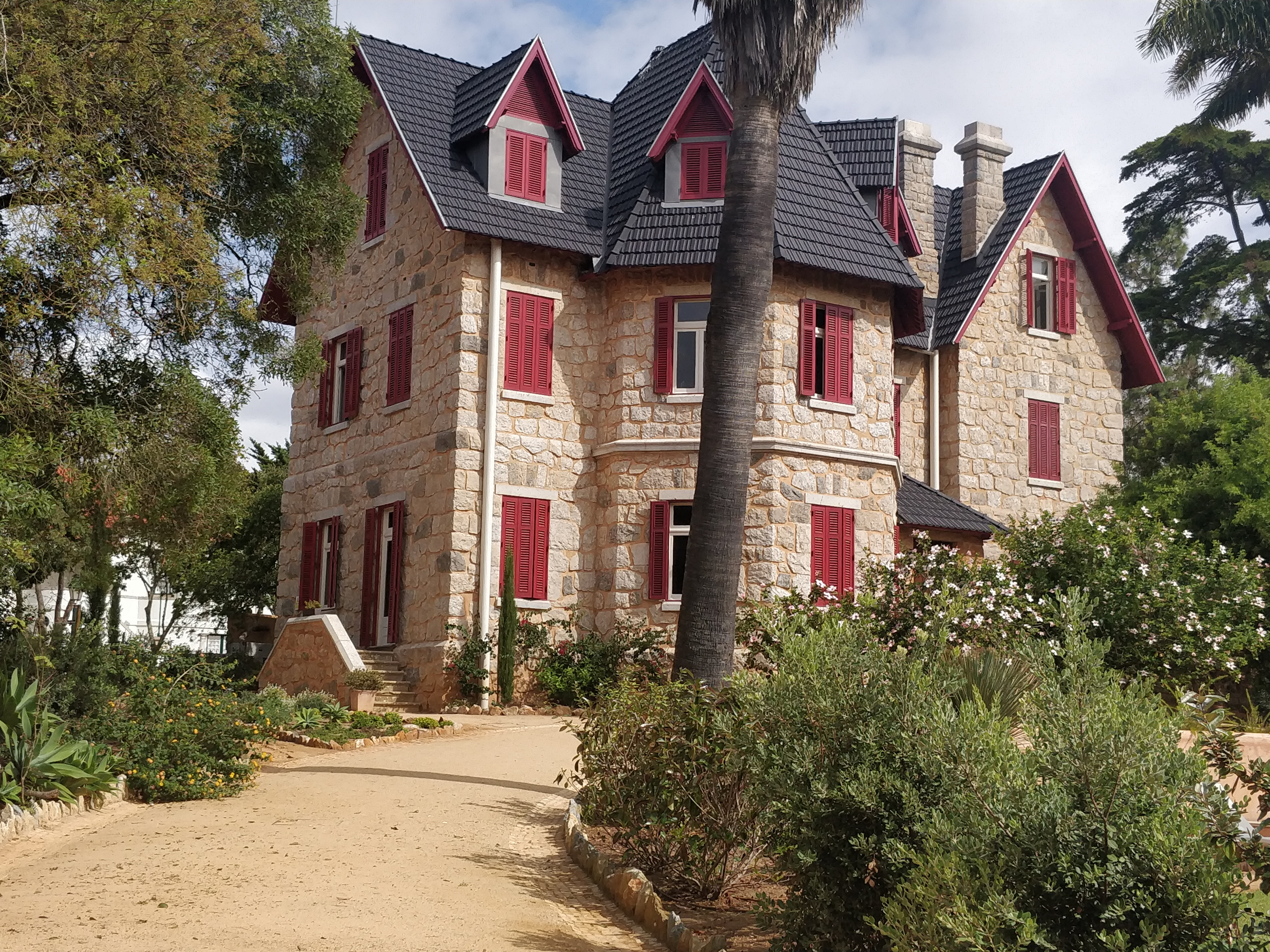
- View of Chalet Ficalho in Cascais
- Interactive map of the Chalet Ficalho area
- Former names: Chalet Costa e Silva

General information
- Type: Summer residence
- Architectural style: Swiss
- Location: Cascais, Portugal, R. José Inácio Roquette, Cascais
- Coordinates: 38°41′46″N 09°25′29″W
- Construction started: 1887 (some sources say 1897)
- Completed: 1888 (some sources say 1898)
- Renovated: Completed 2023
- Client: Viscount of Ovar

Design and construction
- Architect: Manuel Ferreira dos Santos
- Awards and prizes: Maria Tereza and Vasco Vilalva Prize for heritage restoration, 2023

The Chalet Ficalho was a summer residence in Cascais in the Lisbon District of Portugal that was built in 1887–1888 for the Viscount of Ovar and his wife, who would later become the Countess of Ficalho. It is one of the finest examples of the so-called summer architecture of the Cascais area. The building is now a hotel.

== History ==
In the late 1800s many members of the nobility built houses in Cascais, in order to be close to the Portuguese royal family, which had decided to spend the latter part of each summer in the town. In the case of António Máximo da Costa e Silva, Baron and Viscount of Ovar, and his wife Maria Josefa de Melo, future Countess of Ficalho, there was an additional reason for spending time in Cascais as their daughter, Helena, suffered from respiratory problems, and her doctor had prescribed sea air. Originally known as Chalet Costa e Silva, the building was inaugurated on 21 October 1898 with a large party that was reported in the national press.

The building was constructed on land owned by the future countess that was conveniently close to the Sporting Club of Cascais, which had been founded by King Carlos when he was Prince Carlos, and where he was often to be found playing tennis. After the assassination of the King in 1908, the house was left abandoned for some time as the family went into exile, fearing further attacks on the aristocracy.

The house, which has remained in the family to the present, was designed by Manuel Ferreira dos Santos. The garden, which contains many exotic species, was designed by the father of Maria Josefa de Melo, Francisco Manuel de Melo Breyner, 4th Count of Ficalho, a professor of botany who was also one of the founders of the Lisbon Botanical Garden, and a member of the Life's Vanquished group of intellectuals who frequently met in Cascais.

== Rehabilitation ==
In 2023 Chalet Ficalho was unanimously awarded the Maria Tereza and Vasco Vilalva Prize for heritage restoration, administered by the Calouste Gulbenkian Foundation. The jury noted its "deep respect for the original design of the building". The restoration was planned and supervised by the architect, Raúl Vieira. In addition to converting the building to serve as a small hotel, the main features, both interior and exterior, were restored, including the woodwork, furniture, tiles, paintings, glass, chandeliers, and the building's distinctive red shutters.
