= António Champalimaud =

Portuguese banker and businessman (1918 - 2004)

António de Sommer Champalimaud (19 March 1918 in Lapa, Lisbon – 8 May 2004 in Lapa, Lisbon) was a Portuguese banker and industrialist. He was the wealthiest man in Portugal, gaining his fortune through insurance, banking, iron ore mining and cement industries which were predominant both in mainland Portugal and throughout its colonial empire. His companies were nationalized after the Carnation Revolution of 1974. After living in exile in Brazil for seven years, he returned to Portugal and rebuilt his companies.

== Biography ==
Born in 1918, the eldest child and son of Carlos Montez Champalimaud (Peso da Régua, Godim, 13 November 1877 – Cascais, 4 May 1937), a military doctor, Lord of the ancestral home of Quinta do Cotto in the Douro region (great-great-grandson in female line of French Paul Joseph Champalimaud, seigneur de Nussane, who came to Portugal and here married Clara Maria de Sousa Lira e Castro), and wife (m. Lisbon, 2 June 1917) Ana de Araújo de Sommer (Lisbon, 23 April 1885 – ?) (great-granddaughter in male line of German Franz Joseph Freiherr von Sommer and wife Klara Werlein von Ascheberg, who came to Portugal during the Liberal Wars).

He attended the La Guardia Jesuit High School before enrolling at the Faculdade de Ciências da Universidade de Lisboa to study Chemistry. António never finished his college education, for at 19, after his father's death, he took over the family's construction company. Later, at the age of 28 he took over his uncle's (Henrique de Araújo de Sommer, one of Portugal most important industrialists, who had died without issue, as did two of his brothers, two of his sisters and his niece) cement business.

In Cascais, Estoril, at the Igreja de Santo António, on 16 December 1941 he married Dona Maria Cristina da Silva José de Mello (Lapa, Lisbon, 6 March 1920 – Lisbon, Prazeres, 25 August 2006), daughter of the major industrialist Dom Manuel Augusto José de Mello (of the Counts do Cartaxo, Counts and Marquesses of Sabugosa, Counts of São Lourenço and Alferes-Majors of the Realm), and Amélia de Resende Dias de Oliveira da Silva. They had seven children together. Maria Cristina was an heir to the Grupo CUF, a company that was a conglomerate with interests in chemical, textiles, banking, insurances, shipbuilding and repairing, shipping and tobacco industries. They were divorced by 1957, after which he started competing with his ex-brother-in-law in the banking and insurance markets. His ex-wife married secondly in Lisbon, São Mamede, on 29 March 1980 Amaro de Azevedo Gomes (Cascais, São Domingos de Rana, 22 June 1917 – Lisbon, São Mamede, 1 January 2008), without issue.

He bequeathed 500 million euros to establish the Champalimaud Foundation in order to support biomedicine. The foundation also administers a yearly 1 million euro prize for outstanding research related to vision, an appropriate prize, as late in life António lost his eyesight.

== Business ==
Champalimaud expanded the cement business he took over from his uncle Henrique de Sommer in 1946 and expanded it in Portugal to the point of a near monopoly. He also expanded his cement industry into Africa, to the Portuguese overseas territories of Angola and Mozambique. Champalimaud held a more or less monopolistic position on cement production in the colonies as well.

In the early 1960s, he bought the Banco Pinto & Sotto Mayor (BPSM) and the insurance companies Confiança, Mundial and Continental Resseguros. In 1969 he fled to Mexico to avoid an arrest warrant related to an inheritance case over shares of the Empresa de Cimentos de Leiria, his uncle's old company. The warrant was revoked in 1973, after which Champalimaud returned to Portugal.

In 1975, a year after the Carnation Revolution, his companies were nationalized by the new government. Champalimaud first fled to France and ultimately to Brazil. Without his fortune, he restarted building his wealth, first establishing a cement company in Brazil, and later by also operating commercial farms. In 1992, Champalimaud returned to Portugal and started to buy back his old companies.

In a series of transactions, Champalimaud sold the Champalimaud Group to the Banco Santander Central Hispano, BSCH, Spain's largest bank as of 2004.

== See also ==
- Champalimaud Foundation
- "Battle of Aljubarrota Foundation - Official Website".- A foundation created in March 2002, under the initiative of António Champalimaud.
