= Raul Leal =

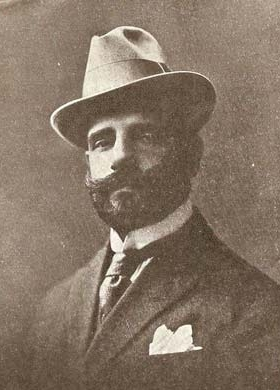
- Raul Leal
- Born: Raul d'Oliveira Sousa Leal; 1 September 1886; Lisbon, Portugal
- Died: 18 August 1964 (aged 77); Lisbon, Portugal
- Occupations: Poet, writer, occultist
- Writing career
- Pen name: Henoch
- Notable work: Sodoma Divinizada
- Literary movement: Modernism, futurism

Raul d'Oliveira Sousa Leal (pseudonym: Henoch; 1 September 1886 – 18 August 1964) was a Portuguese writer, poet, and occultist. A figure associated with modernism and futurism, he was also one of the contributors to the Portuguese avant-garde literary magazine Orpheu. He is best known for his controversial work Sodoma Divinizada.

== Biography ==
Raul Leal graduated in law from the University of Coimbra in 1909. In 1915, he went into exile in Spain due to political reasons.

=== Autobiographical note ===
In my parents' house, I received a most luxurious education, becoming well-acquainted with all the splendours and refinements; it was therefore natural that I should want to maintain that lifestyle—even if it meant stooping to the greatest ignominies—especially since my ambitions for luxury were always intense, and my desires and greed unrestrained. Yet I crushed all that within me, because only in shame could such desires be fulfilled, and I refused in any way to shatter my dignity—always intact, always immaculate. Despite everything, I chose misery and hunger!

— Raul Leal, Sodoma Divinizada (1989), p. 109

Leal was among the first to introduce futurism to Portuguese literature. In 1915, he published the "vertiginous novella" Atelier in the second issue of Orpheu, intended as part of an unpublished collection titled Devaneios e Alucinações ("Reveries and Hallucinations"). Uniquely in Portuguese literature, he wrote all his poetic work in French. In 1923, he planned to write a "metaphysical drama" titled O Incompreendido ("The Misunderstood").

He contributed widely to various modernist publications:

- In 1916, he published A Aventura dum Sátiro ou a Morte de Adónis in the magazine Centauro.
- In 1917, he contributed the article L'Abstraccionisme Futuriste to Portugal Futurista, analyzing a work by Santa-Rita Pintor.
- He collaborated in the magazines Pirâmide (1959–1960), Athena (edited by Fernando Pessoa), and Sudoeste (1935), edited by Almada Negreiros.

=== Life of Sacrifice ===
During four horrible years of hunger and poverty, I never let myself fall into degradation. Despite my suffering, I always found the inner strength to work on my Work. So many times, frozen and barely able to stand from sheer hunger, I climbed the grand staircase of the Madrid Library—scarcely heated in winter—to seek in metaphysical study a vague forgetting of my pain, giving higher meaning to my existence.

— Raul Leal, Sodoma Divinizada (1989), pp. 108–109

== Sodoma Divinizada and Controversy ==
In 1923, Leal published Sodoma Divinizada with the Olisipo publishing house, managed by Fernando Pessoa. The book became central to the literary scandal later known as the "Literature of Sodom", which also involved António Botto’s poetry book Canções (second edition, 1922).

The controversy was sparked by Pessoa's article António Botto e o Ideal Estético em Portugal in the magazine Contemporânea (No. 3, July 1922). The ensuing public debate involved several figures, including journalist Álvaro Maia and junior politician Pedro Teotónio Pereira.

In March 1923, the civil governor of Lisbon ordered the **seizure and public burning** of Canções, Sodoma Divinizada, and Decadência by Judite Teixeira. In response, Leal published the pamphlet Uma Lição de Moral aos Estudantes de Lisboa e o Descaramento da Igreja Católica ("A Moral Lesson for the Students of Lisbon and the Impudence of the Catholic Church").

== Works ==
=== Selected publications ===
- (1909) A Apassionáta de Beethoven e Viâna da Móta. Coimbra: França Amado.
- (1913) A Liberdade Transcendente. Lisbon: A. M. Teixeira.
- (1915) "Atelier. Novela vertígica", in Orpheu No. 2.
- (1916) "A Aventura dum Sátiro ou a Morte de Adónis", in Centauro No. 1.
- (1917) "L'Abstraccionisme Futuriste", in Portugal Futurista (single issue).
- (1920) Antéchrist et la Gloire du Saint-Esprit. Lisbon: Portugalia.
- (1923) Sodoma Divinizada. Lisbon: Olisipo.
- (1923) Uma Lição de Moral aos Estudantes de Lisboa e o Descaramento da Igreja Católica.
- (1943) Repetidor de Filosofia. Porto: Livraria Educação Nacional.
- (1960) Sindicalismo Personalista. Lisbon: Editorial Verbo.
- (1961) Sodoma Divinizada, 2nd ed. Lisbon: Contraponto.

=== Posthumous Editions ===
- (1970) O Sentido Esotérico da História, ed. Pinharanda Gomes.
- (1970) Problemas do Desporto, ed. Pinharanda Gomes.
- (1977) Textos de Raúl Leal, Natália Correia, Lima de Freitas, ed. Mário Cesariny.
- (1989) Sodoma Divinizada, 3rd ed., ed. Aníbal Fernandes. Lisbon: Hiena.
- (2007) O Caso Mental Português (Fernando Pessoa), followed by A Loucura Universal (Raul Leal). Almargem do Bispo: Padrões Culturais.
- (2010) Jorge de Sena / Raul Leal: Correspondência 1957–1960, ed. José Augusto Seabra. Lisbon: Guerra & Paz.

== See also ==
- Fernando Pessoa
- Orpheu
- Portuguese modernism
- António Botto
- Judite Teixeira
