= Diurnal temperature variation =

Variation between a high and low air temperature during the same day

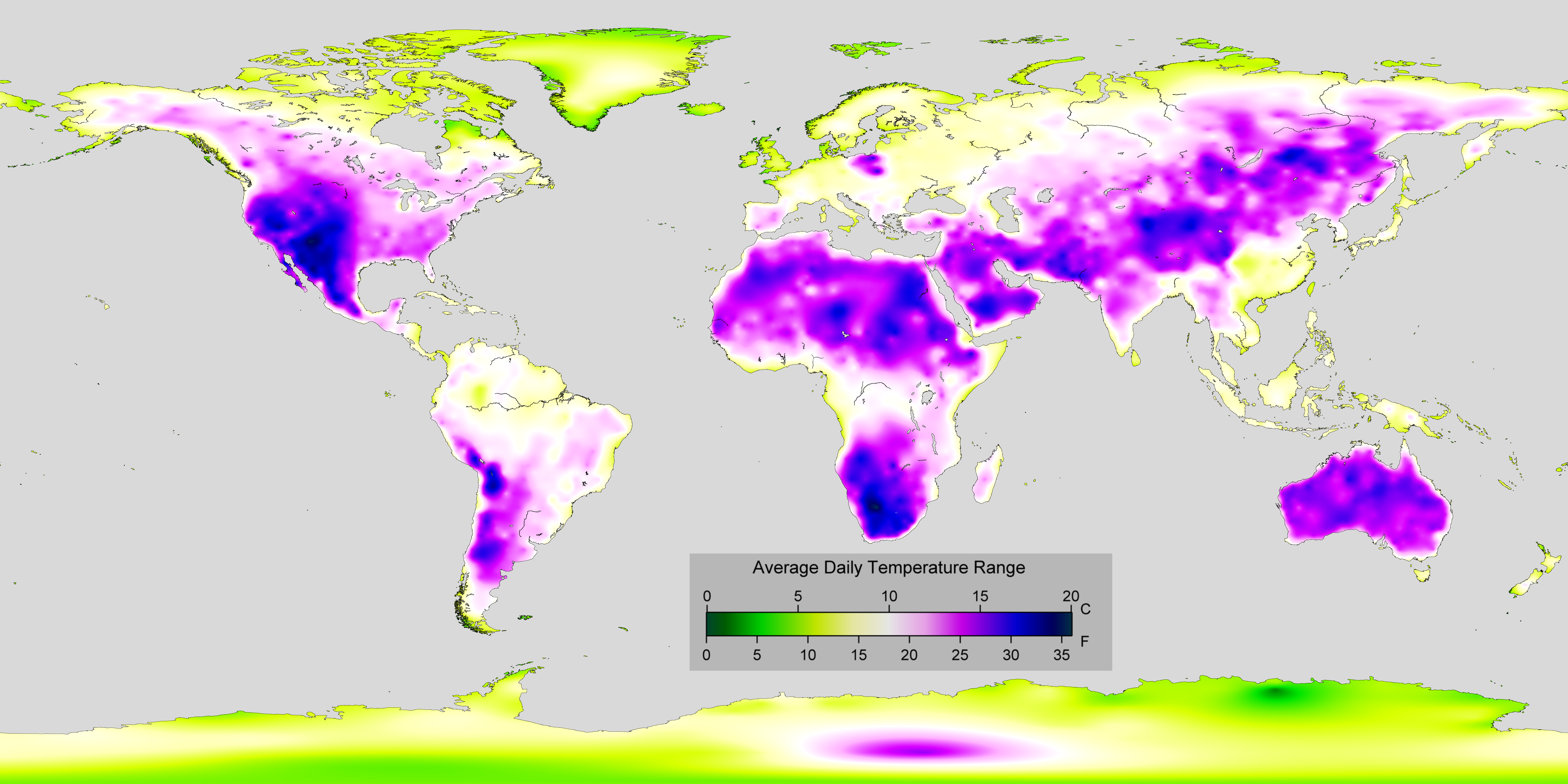
Map of global diurnal temperature range over land from 1951 to 1980

In meteorology, diurnal temperature variation is the variation between a high air temperature and a low temperature that occurs during the same day.

== Temperature lag ==
Temperature lag, also known as thermal inertia, is an important factor in diurnal temperature variation. Peak daily temperature generally occurs after noon, as air keeps absorbing net heat for a period of time from morning through noon and some time thereafter. Similarly, minimum daily temperature generally occurs substantially after midnight, indeed occurring during early morning in the hour around dawn, since heat is lost all night long. The analogous annual phenomenon is seasonal lag.

As solar energy strikes the Earth's surface each morning, a shallow 1–3-centimetre (0.39–1.18 in) layer of air directly above the ground is heated by conduction. Heat exchange between this shallow layer of warm air and the cooler air above is very inefficient. On a warm summer's day, for example, air temperatures may vary by 16.5 °C (30 °F) from just above the ground to chest height. Incoming solar radiation exceeds outgoing heat energy for many hours after noon and equilibrium is usually reached from 3–5 p.m., but this may be affected by a variety of factors such as large bodies of water, soil type and cover, wind, cloud cover/water vapor, and moisture on the ground.

== Differences in variation ==
Diurnal temperature variations are greatest very near Earth's surface. The Tibetan and Andean Plateaus present one of the largest differences in daily temperature on the planet, as does the Western US and the western portion of southern Africa.

High desert regions typically have the greatest diurnal-temperature variations, while low-lying humid areas near the shores (tropical, oceanic, and arctic) typically have the least. Large cities (urban heat islands) also tend to have a lower diurnal temperature variation than surrounding areas. This explains why an area like the Pinnacles National Park can have high temperatures of 38 °C (100 °F) during a summer day, and then have lows of 5–10 °C (41–50 °F). At the same time, Washington D.C., which is much more humid, has temperature variations of only 8 °C (14 °F); urban Hong Kong has a diurnal temperature range of little more than 4 °C (7.2 °F).

While the National Park Service claimed that the world single-day record is a variation of 102 °F (56.7 °C) (from 46 °F or 7.8 °C to −56 °F or −48.9 °C) in Browning, Montana in 1916, the Montana Department of Environmental Quality claimed that Loma, Montana also had a variation of 102 °F (56.7 °C) (from −54 °F or −47.8 °C to 48 °F or 8.9 °C) in 1972. Both these extreme daily temperature changes were the result of sharp air-mass changes within a single day. The 1916 event was an extreme temperature drop, resulting from frigid Arctic air from Canada invading northern Montana, displacing a much warmer air mass. The 1972 event was a chinook event, where air from the Pacific Ocean overtopped mountain ranges to the west, and dramatically warmed in its descent into Montana, displacing frigid Arctic air and causing a drastic temperature rise.

In the absence of such extreme air-mass changes, diurnal temperature variations typically range from 10 °F (5.6 °C) or smaller in humid, tropical areas, up to 40 to 50 °F (22.2 to 27.8 °C) in higher-elevation, arid to semi-arid areas, such as parts of the U.S. Western states' Intermountain Plateau areas, for example Elko, Nevada, Ashton, Idaho and Burns, Oregon. The higher the humidity is, the lower the diurnal temperature variation is.

In Europe, due to its more northern latitude and close proximity to large warm water bodies (such as the Mediterranean), differences in daily temperature are not as pronounced as in other continents. However, places in Southern Europe significantly far from the Mediterranean tend to have high differences in daily temperatures, some around 14 °C (25 °F). These include Southwestern Iberia (e.g. Alvega or Badajoz) or the high-altitude plateaus of Turkey (if considered part of Europe) (e.g. Kayseri).

In Australia, significant diurnal temperature variations generally occur in the Red Centre around Alice Springs and Uluru.

== Viticulture ==
Diurnal temperature variation is of particular importance in viticulture. Wine regions situated in areas of high altitude experience the most dramatic swing in temperature variation during the course of a day. In grapes, this variation has the effect of producing high acid and high sugar content as the grapes' exposure to sunlight increases the ripening qualities while the sudden drop in temperature at night preserves the balance of natural acids in the grape.

== See also ==
- Diurnal cycle
