= Palácio da Cidadela =

Former summer residence of the Portuguese Royal Family

Cascais Citadel Palace Museum
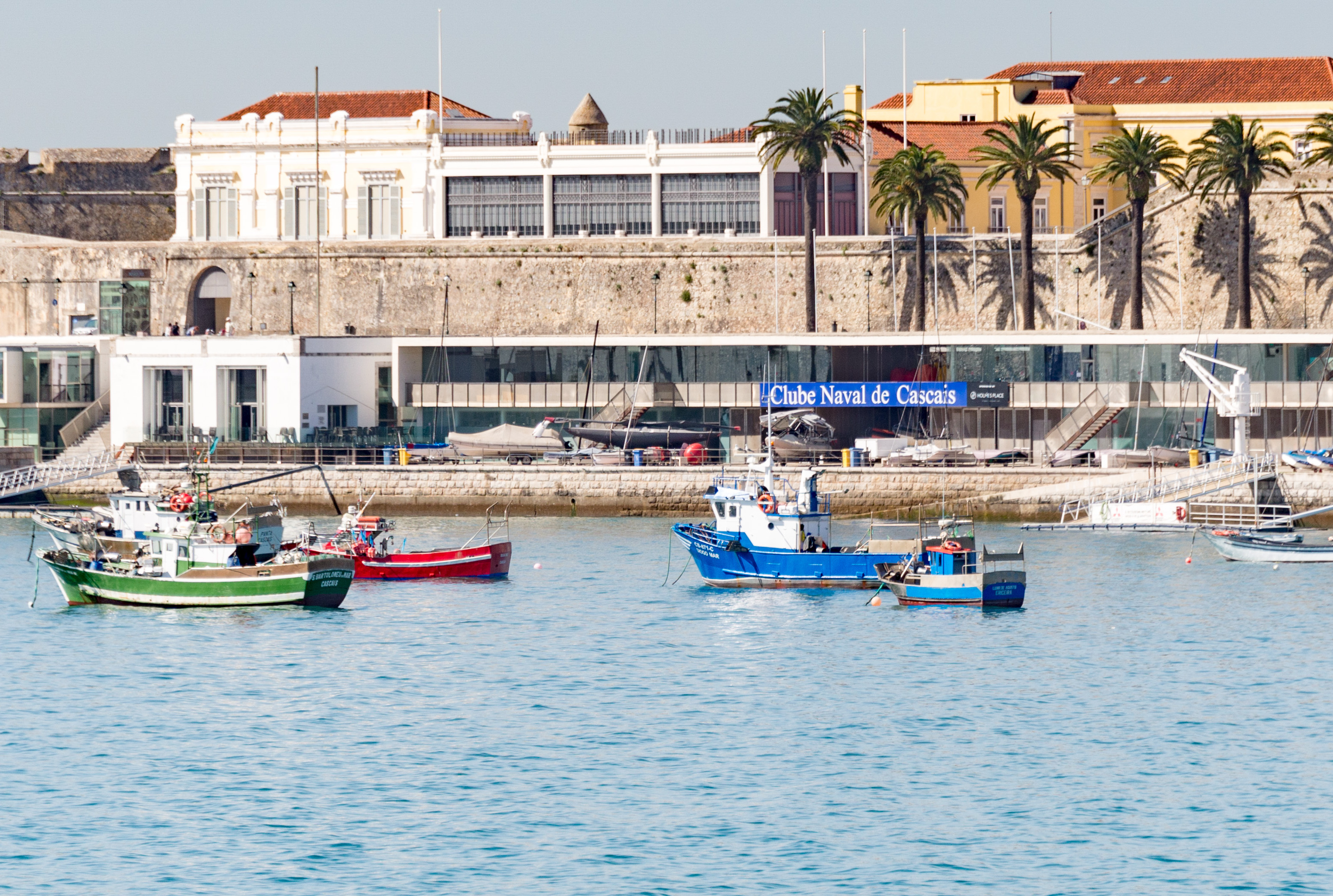
- Established: 2011; 14 years ago
- Location: Avenida Dom Carlos I, Cascais, Portugal
- Coordinates: 38°41′41.1″N 09°25′09.1″W
- Website: http://www.museu.presidencia.pt/index_detail.php?sid=1781

The Cascais Citadel Palace Museum (Portuguese: Palácio da Cidadela) is situated inside the grounds of the Citadel of Cascais, in Cascais, Lisbon district, Portugal. Formerly the residence of the governor of the citadel, it was refurbished for use as the summer residence of the royal family, which spent September there annually from 1870 until the assassination of Carlos I in 1908. It was subsequently used as one of the official residences of Portuguese presidents, but over time fell into neglect. After extensive restoration it was opened as a museum in 2011. The palace forms part of the Museum of the Presidency of the Republic, (Portuguese: Museu da Presidência da República), which has its headquarters at the Belém Palace in Lisbon.

== History ==
By 1870, Cascais had lost its strategic importance for the defence of the Lisbon coast and the River Tagus estuary and the citadel was no longer required for military purposes. Luís I adapted the old house of the governor to a vacation residence. The royal family popularised sea bathing and their presence in Cascais in September led to the Portuguese nobility also building houses in the town so they could be close to the King. The practice of royal visits continued under King Carlos I until his assassination. King Carlos dedicated himself to the study of the oceans, installing in the Citadel the first Portuguese marine biology laboratory. Following the 5 October 1910 revolution and the end of the monarchy the palace was assigned to the presidency of the republic and used as a residence by several presidents.

== The Museum ==
Development of the palace into a museum was first discussed in 2004 and was completed in 2011 at a cost of €4.2 million. There is a permanent exhibition as well as rooms on the ground floor available for temporary exhibitions. Visitors have access to the chapel of Nossa Senhora da Vitória, and to most of the rooms of the palace, including the old bedroom of King Luís I, or the Arab room, which subsequently served as an office to President Francisco Craveiro Lopes.
