= Palmela Palace =

19th-century summer residence in Cascais, Lisbon District, Portugal

Palmela Palace in Cascais
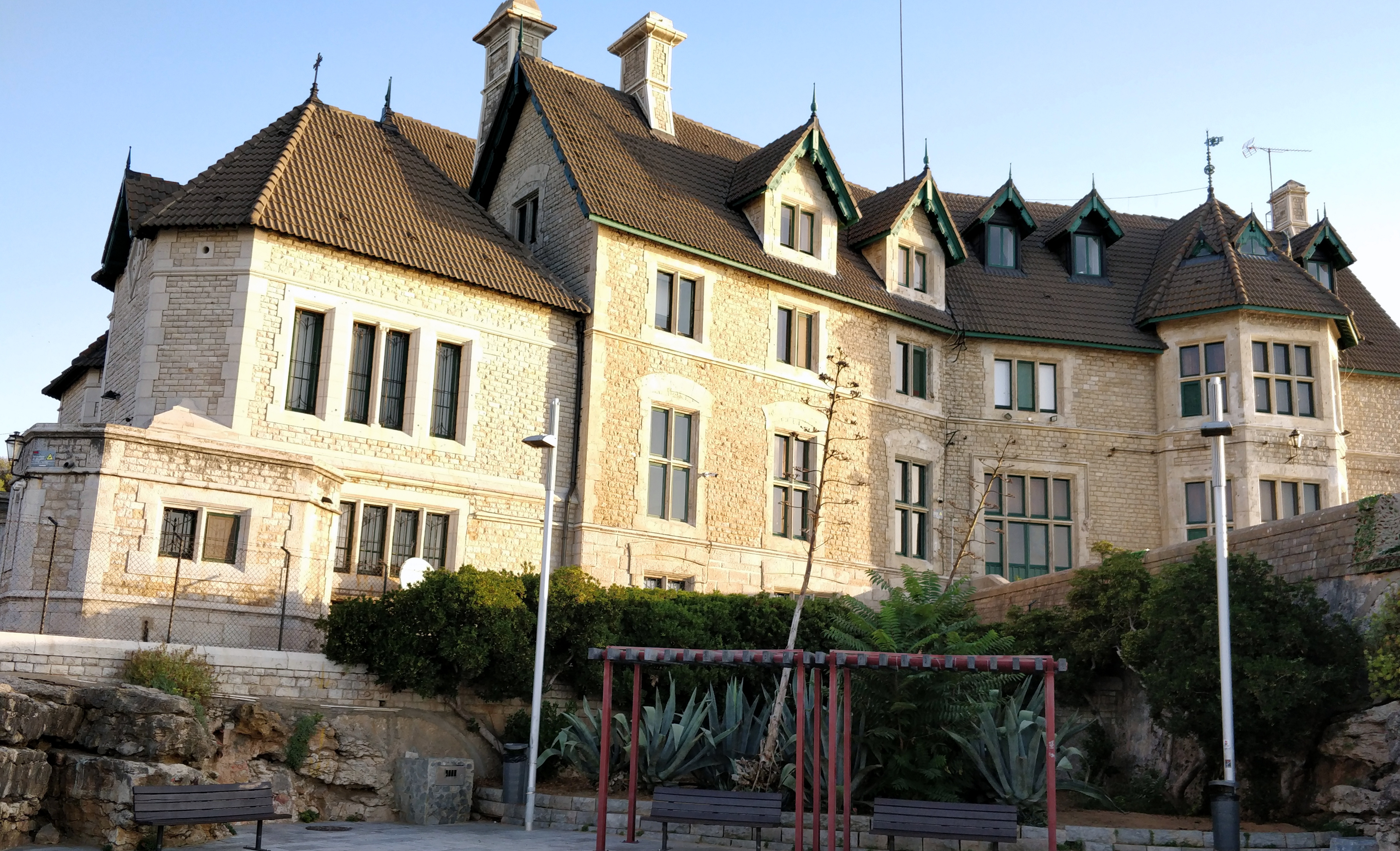
- View of the Palmela Palace in Cascais
- Interactive map of the Palmela Palace in Cascais area
- Alternative names: Palácio Palmela or Conceição Velha

General information
- Type: Summer residence
- Architectural style: English Gothic
- Location: Cascais, Portugal
- Coordinates: 38°42′04.1″N 09°24′48.7″W
- Construction started: 1874
- Client: Duke of Palmela

Design and construction
- Architect: Thomas Henry Wyatt

The Palmela Palace (Portuguese: Palácio Palmela), also known as the Conceição Velha, was a summer residence in Cascais, Lisbon District, Portugal built for the Duke and Duchess of Palmela in 1874. It is considered to be a major example of the so-called summer architecture of the Cascais area.

== History ==
The Palmela Palace was built as a summer palace towards the end of the nineteenth century when Cascais became the summer resort of the royal family and, consequently, of the Portuguese court. This was one of the largest houses built by Portuguese nobility in Cascais at that time. It was constructed on the site of the disused fort of Our Lady of the Conception (Portuguese: Forte de Nossa Senhora da Conceição), which was acquired by the Palmela family from the state in 1868 or 1869. The agreement signed with the government required the buyers to keep intact the line of fire to the Cascais coastline, ensuring that the new building could be used for military purposes in case of war.

The drawings for the palace were delivered in 1873 and construction work began in that year or in early 1874. Designed by an English architect, Thomas Henry Wyatt, it draws heavily on the Perpendicular English Gothic style and uses local stone. The position of the palace next to the sea is well expressed in its profusion of gazebos and bay windows. The plan was asymmetrical; giving the idea of an older house that had been restored and added to rather than a recent construction. In the 1880s, the building was restructured by the architect José António Gaspar, with the aim of creating room for a chapel. However, this work was found to be inadequate and the Duke of Palmela then entrusted José Luís Monteiro to do further renovation between 1890 and 1895.

Under close control of the Duchess, a park was developed in the area around the house, with trees and some small lakes. The park contains a rare Portuguese example of the Canary Island Pine. Its present size is smaller than the original, having been divided by the construction of the railway line from Cascais to Lisbon in 1889.

== See also ==
Palace of the Dukes of Palmela
