= Casa Sommer =

Historic building in Cascais, Portugal now used as a municipal archive and museum

Casa Sommer, Cascais
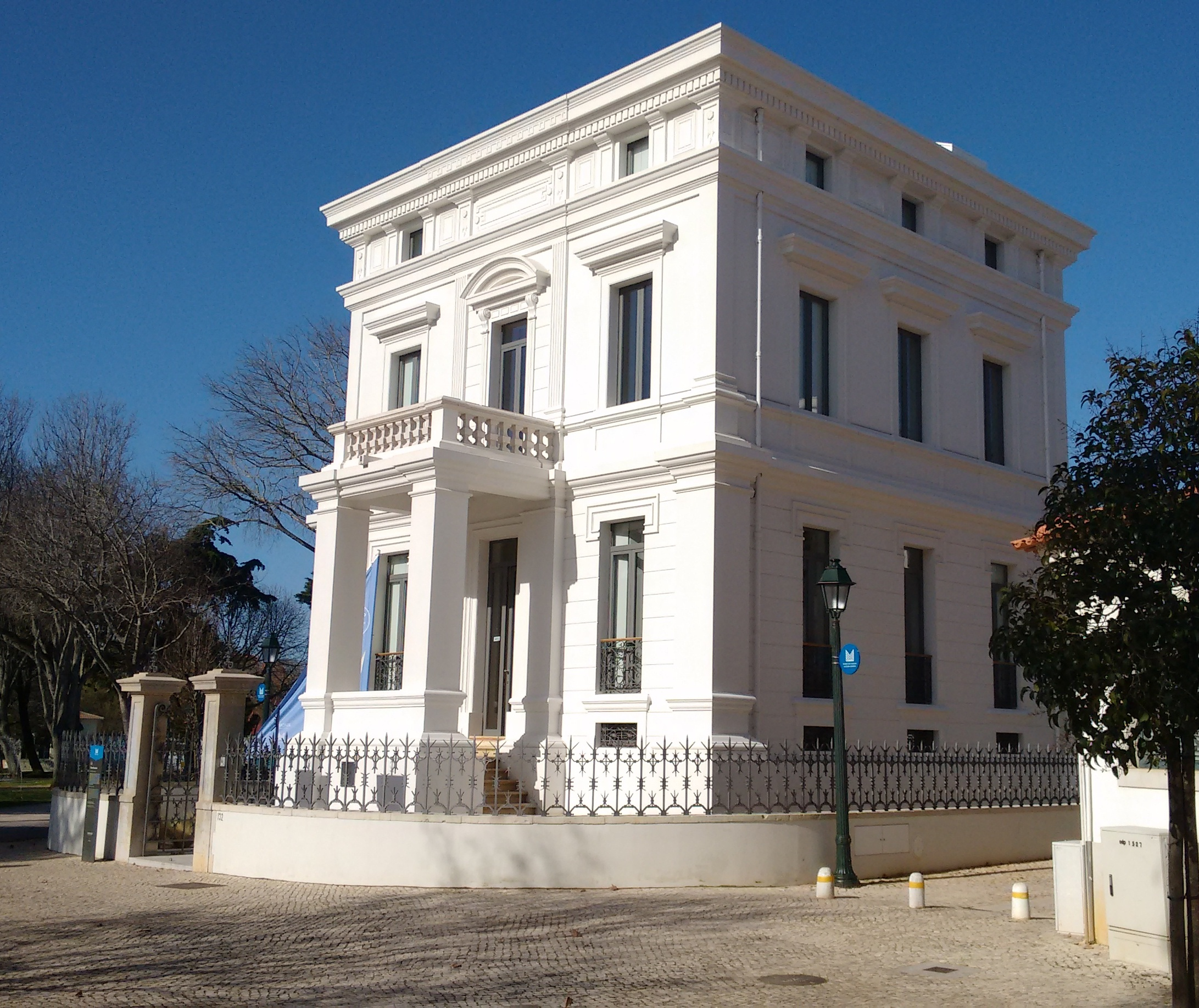
- Casa Sommer, Exhibition and documentation centre in Cascais, Portugal

- Location within Portugal
- Established: 2016; 10 years ago
- Location: Av. da República, 132, Cascais, Portugal
- Coordinates: 38.6949°N 9.4239°W

Casa Sommer is a building in Cascais, on the Portuguese Riviera, which houses the Cascais Municipal Historical Archive and a branch of the Cascais Municipal Library, hosting collections pertaining to the town's archaeological, architectural, historical and cultural heritage. Built as the residence of entrepreneur Henrique de Sommer, Casa Sommer is a noted example of Summer architecture.

== History ==
The house was constructed at the end of the 19th century. It is considered the most important example of a neoclassical private residence in Cascais. The exterior features smooth and curved pediments, fluted pilasters, and triglyphs. The main façade features a rectangular portico, which frames the entrance and creates the balcony on the second floor, which is protected by a balustrade.

After it ceased to be a family home the house was for a time used as a language school and then a children's home, before falling into disrepair for a time. It was then restored by the Municipality of Cascais and officially opened on 7 December 2016. The work, led by the architect Paula Santos, which also included the building's old coach house, succeeded in adding considerable internal floor space. It included construction of a new underground corridor linking the main building to the coach house, which now houses the Municipal Historical Archive.

== Collection ==
On display is the restored Foral of Cascais, which was a royal document signed by Manuel I of Portugal whose purpose was to establish a town or village Council and regulate its administration, borders and privileges. A community would need a Foral in order to function as a town. The second oldest book is the Livro de Posturas (Book of Regulations), which recorded the town's rules and regulations.
