= Summer architecture =

Portuguese architectural movement

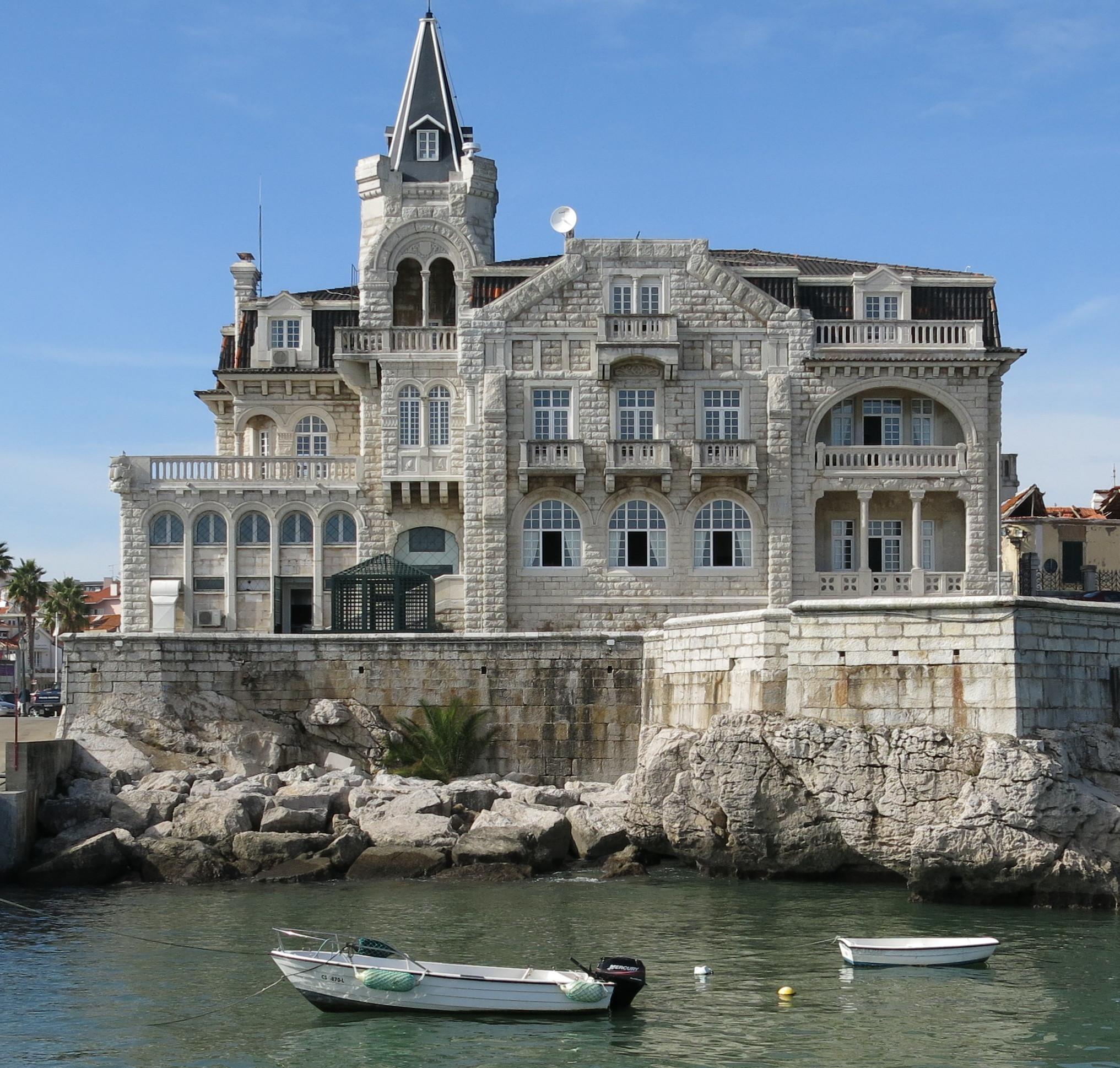
Palacete Seixas in Cascais, designed by Norte Júnior.

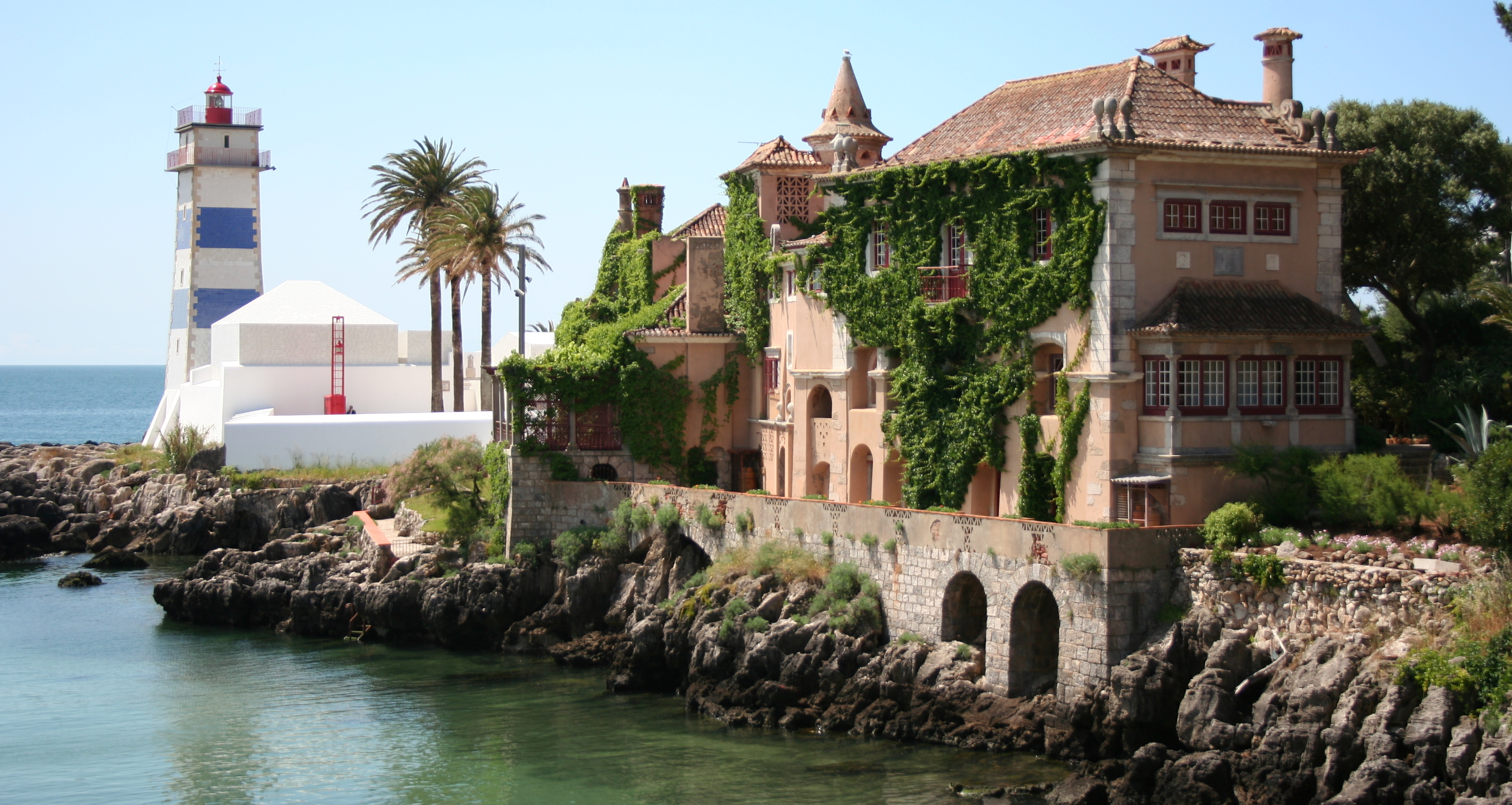
Casa de Santa Maria in Cascais, was designed by Raul Lino in 1902.

Summer architecture (Portuguese: arquitetura de veraneio) was a Portuguese architectural movement originating in the Portuguese Riviera, in the late 19th and early 20th centuries, when the region became a popular resort destination for the Portuguese royal family and the Portuguese aristocracy. The movement is not characterized by any single architectural style or artistic school, but rather unified by common themes, including leisure, wellness, exoticism, and heterotopia.

The Portuguese Riviera, the coastal region west of the capital Lisbon centered on the cities of Cascais, Sintra, and Oeiras, became a resort destination in the 1870s when King Luís I of Portugal began spending his summers at the Palácio da Cidadela in Cascais. A development boom ensued along the coast, accompanied by the construction of the Cascais railway and the Sintra railway, resulting in the construction of palaces, estates, and chalets of Lisbon's aristocracy for use in the summer. The movement's proliferation in the Portuguese Riviera influenced architectural and stylistic tastes across Portugal's other coastal regions, namely Figueira da Foz and Foz do Douro.

== History ==
The Palácio dos Condes de Castro Guimarães in Cascais

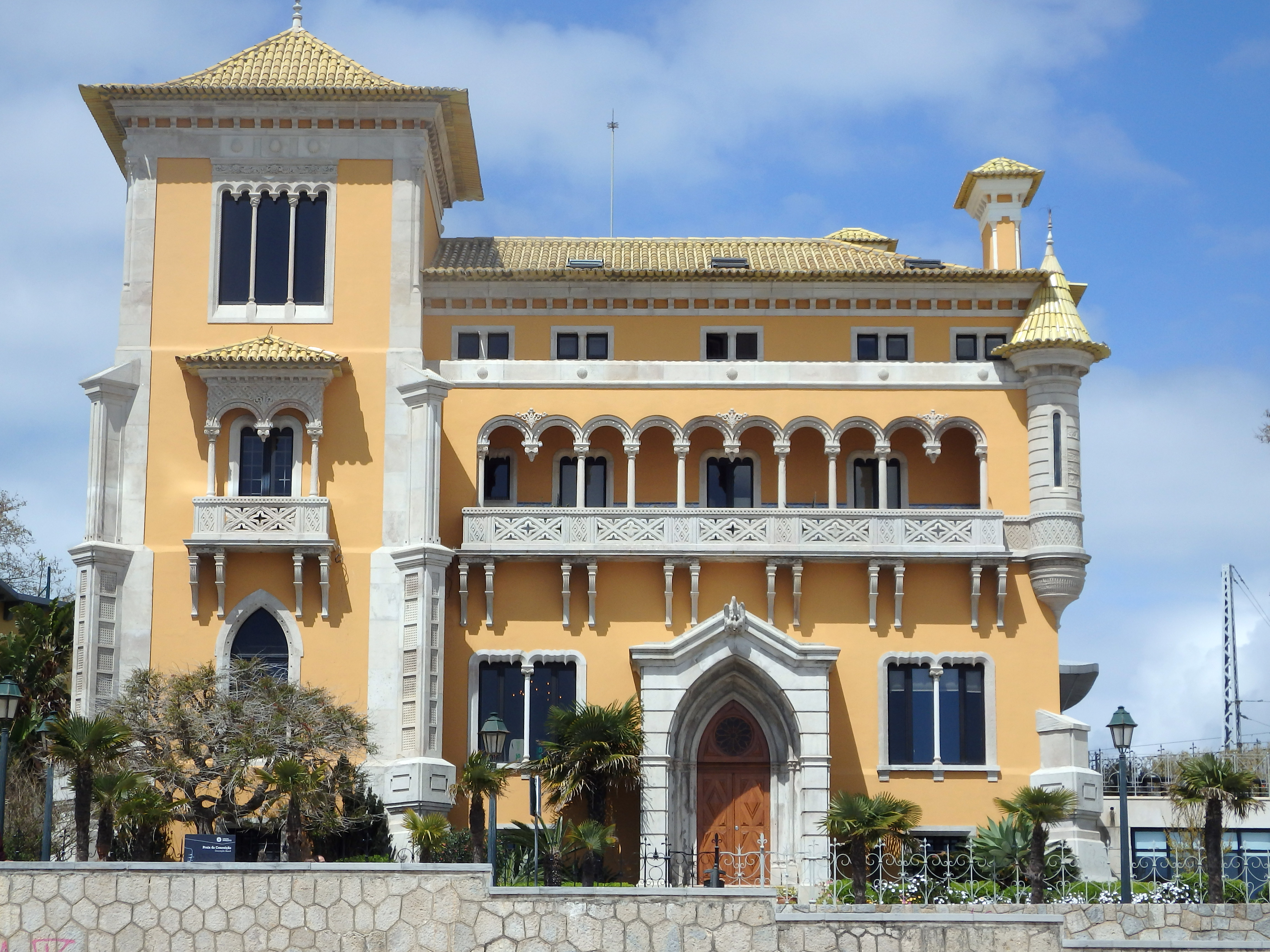
Casa Lencastre was built in 1898

Sea bathing was already becoming popular in Portugal in the mid-1850s. Cascais, with its protected beaches, was attracting tourists from the capital, Lisbon, and the numbers increased considerably following the opening of a road to the capital in 1863 and the commencement of a stagecoach service. Further stimulus for people to visit Cascais came as a result of the first visit to the town by Queen Maria Pia in September 1867 and the completion of a road from Sintra to Cascais in 1868. Sintra, situated in hills and therefore cooler in the summer, was a popular summer retreat for the royal family and the nobility of Lisbon.

Following renovation of the house of the governor of the Cascais Citadel, the royal family stayed there for several weeks in 1870 and did so in subsequent years. It rapidly became normal for the nobility to leave Sintra and transfer to Cascais in early to mid-September in order to be close to the king. However, the quality of hotels in the town was considered poor and noble families began to construct their own homes, beginning with the Duke of Palmela and the Duke of Loulé.

In time, rich businessmen also built summer houses, including Jorge O'Neil, a tobacco baron, and Henrique de Sommer, who became Portugal's leading cement producer.

Estoril would later become a royal retreat for members of the Spanish royal family, Italian royal family, French royal family, Austrian imperial family, and numerous other royal and noble families from across Europe between the World Wars.

== Styles ==
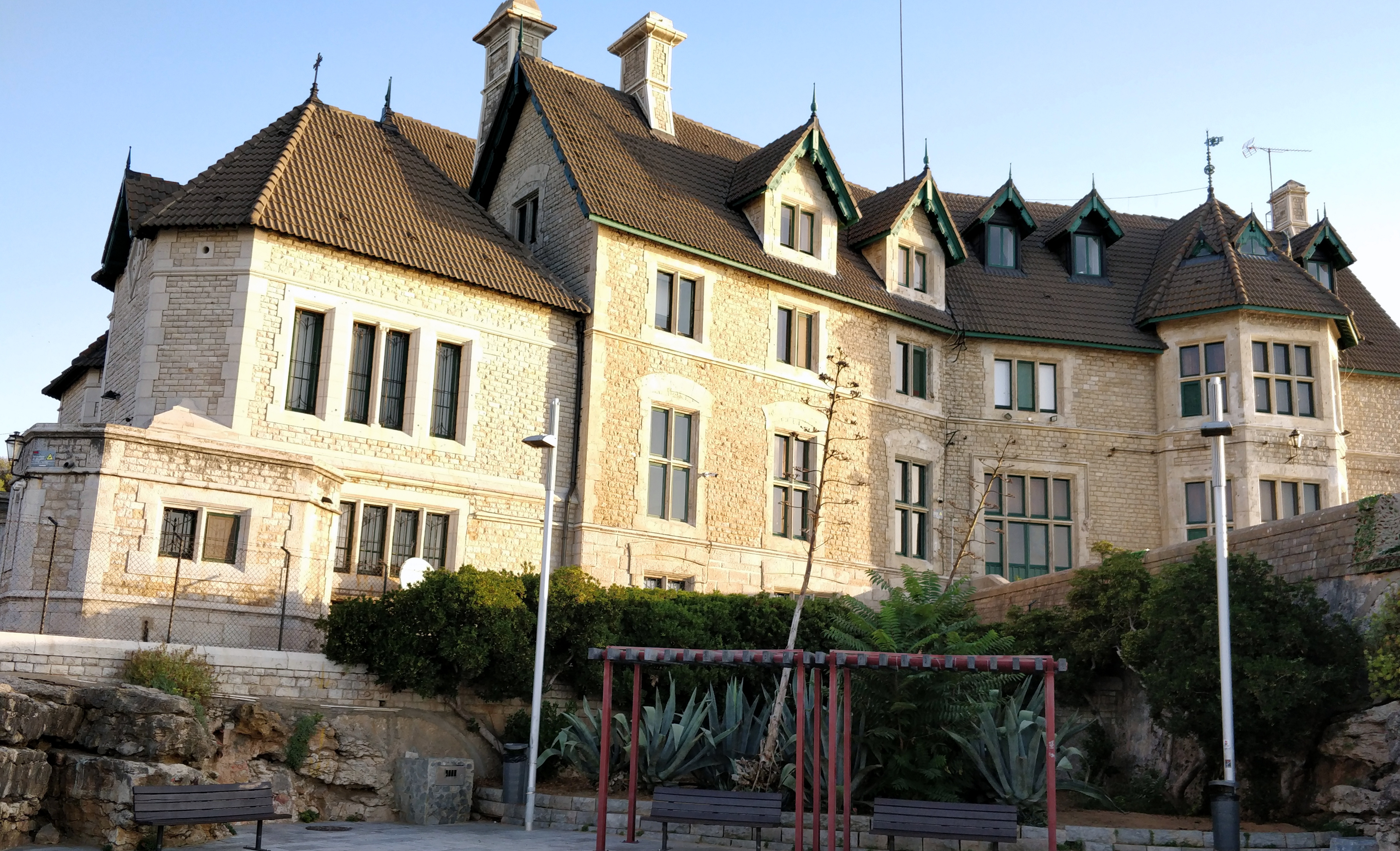
Palmela Palace, built in 1874

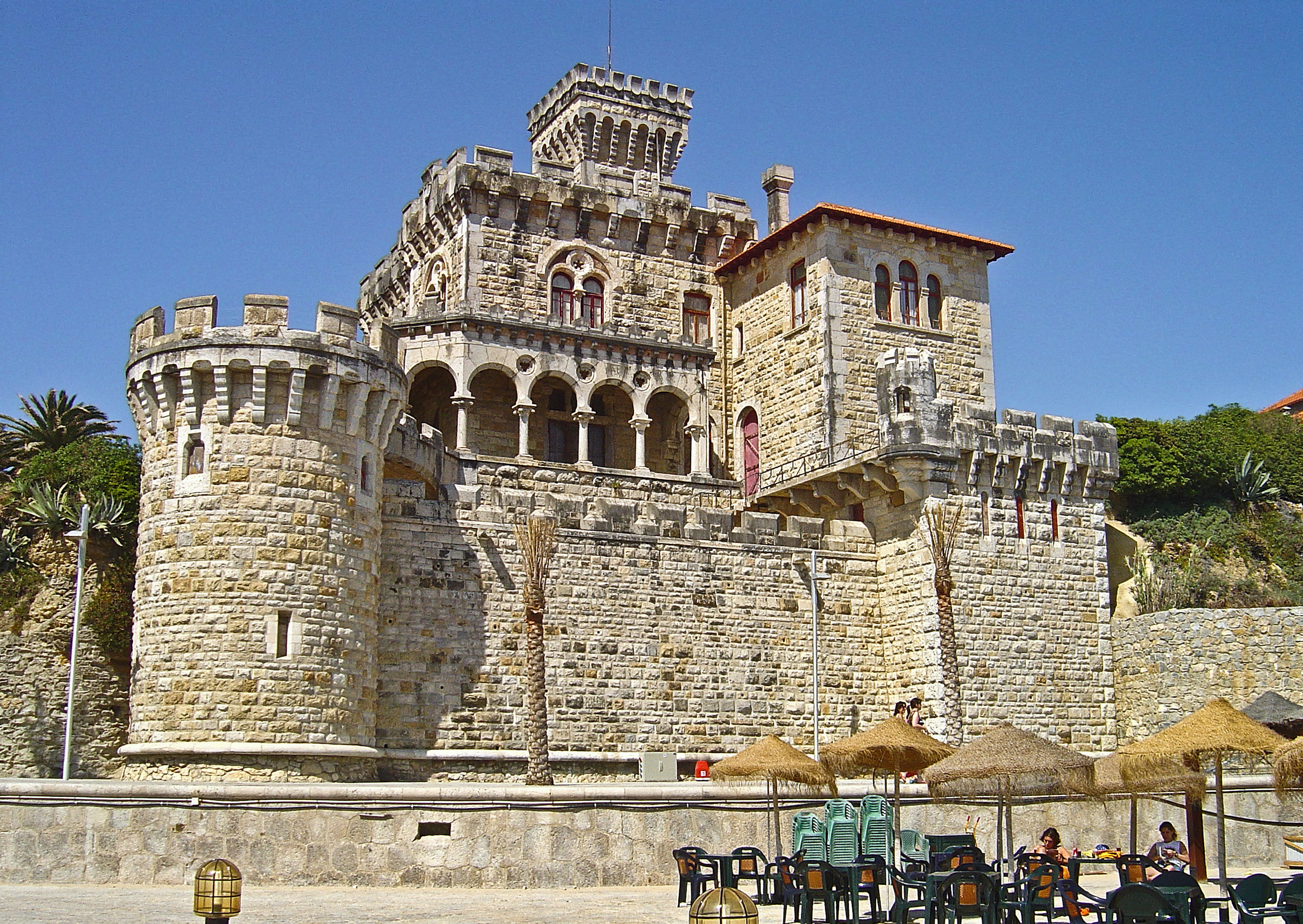
Estoril's Chalet Barros, also known as Forte da Cruz, built in 1894.

In design the new houses were rather different from the houses owned by the nobility in Lisbon, and came to be referred to as summer architecture. They were eclectic, both in their individual designs and in the wide range of architectural styles chosen by the owners, and aimed for a high level of external decoration. Architects used included Thomas Henry Wyatt from England and the Portuguese Raul Lino, who designed around 700 projects in his lifetime and developed the idealized concept of A Casa Portuguesa or the Portuguese House. Styles used included Italianate, Swiss chalet style, English Gothic, Louis XIII style, and neoclassical.

The Palácio do Conde de Castro Guimarães used a Revivalist approach that included Neo-romanticism, Neo-Gothic, Neo-Manueline and Neo-Moorish styles.

Following the overthrow of the monarchy in 1910, there was not the same imperative for affluent citizens of Lisbon to be in Cascais every September. Nevertheless, the building of exotic summer houses continued and extended to neighbouring Estoril, which was becoming a popular resort area and opened a casino in 1916.

== Notable examples ==
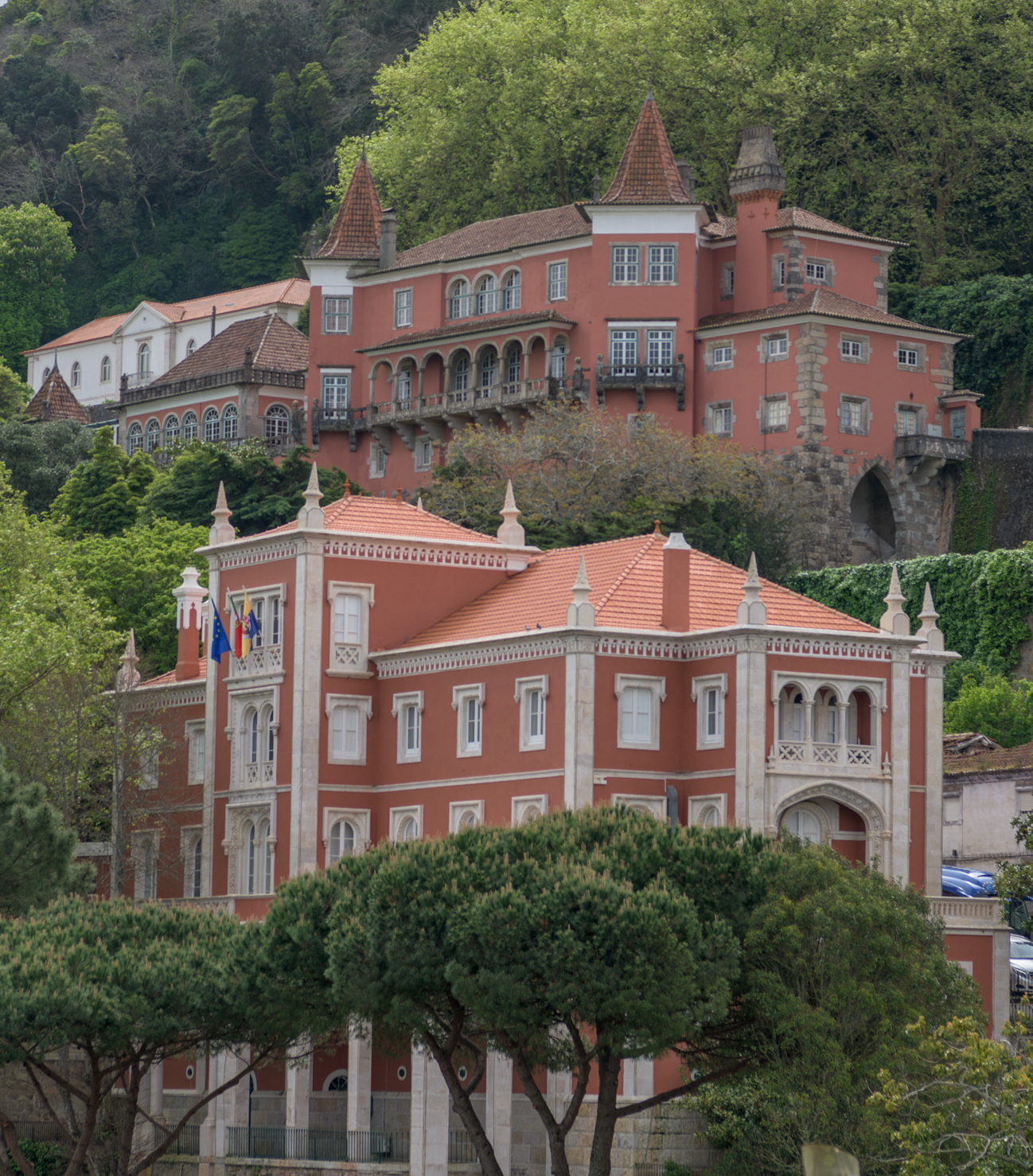
Sintra's Casa dos Penedos (top) and Palácio Valenças (bottom) are UNESCO World Heritage

Cascais

- Palácio dos Condes de Castro Guimarães
- Casa Sommer
- Cascais Cultural Centre
- Palmela Palace
- Casa de Santa Maria
- Casa de São Bernardo
- Chalet Faial
- Chalet Leitão
- Palácio do Duque de Loulé
- Chalet Ficalho
- Casa dos Pórticos
- Casa d'Orey
- Casa Perestrelo de Vasconcelos
- Casa D. Pedro
- Palacete Seixas
- Casa Maria Helena
- Casa Trindade Baptista
- Palácio dos Condes de Monte Real

Estoril

- Casa Verdades de Faria
- Chalet Barros
- Cavalariças de Santos Jorge

Sintra

- Casa dos Penedos
- Palácio Valença
