= Eduardo Pitta =

Portuguese writer (1949–2023)

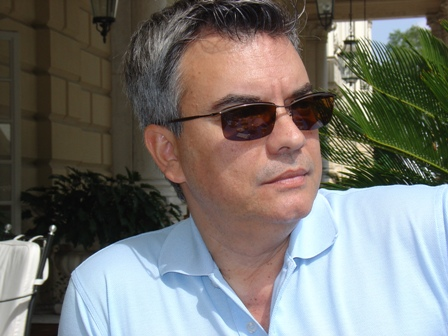
- Born: 9 August 1949; Lourenço Marques, Portuguese Mozambique
- Died: 25 July 2023 (aged 73); Torres Vedras, Portugal
- Occupations: Novelist, poet, critic
- Website: www.eduardopitta.com

Eduardo Pitta (9 August 1949 – 25 July 2023) was a Portuguese poet, fiction writer and essayist.

== Biography ==
Born in Lourenço Marques, now Maputo, on 9 August 1949, he lived in Mozambique until 1975. He had published ten books of poetry. A large selection of that corpus of poems was collected in Desobediência, 2011. It is represented in several anthologies of contemporary Portuguese poetry. A significant number of his essays and critical writings have been collected in six volumes. With his trilogy of short-stories Persona, 2000, his writing underwent a tectonic movement. One of these stories, Kalahari, was translated by Alison Aiken and published in Chroma, a Queer Literary Journal, from London. In 2013 he published a memoir, Um Rapaz a Arder. His poetry and prose have appeared in various magazines and anthologies in Portugal, Spain, France, Brasil, Colombia, England, Israel, USA and, in his early years (1968–1975), in Mozambique. In addition to the short story The Stratagem, published in the collective volume, he has published several short stories in the magazine Egoísta. He did literary criticism in the magazines Colóquio-Letras (1987–2018), LER (1990–2006), and Sábado (2011–2022), as well as in the newspapers Diário de Notícias (1996–1998) and Público (2005–2011). Between 1994 and 2006, he was the author of the poetry criticism section O Som & o Sentido for the magazine LER. In the same magazine, between 2008 and 2014, he published chronicles in the column Heterodoxias.

== Personal life and death ==
Pitta married Jorge Neves, his partner from 1972, in 2010. Eduardo Pitta died on 25 July 2023, at the age of 73.

== Works ==
=== Poetry ===
Year	Title
1974	Sílaba a Sílaba
1979	Um Cão de Angústia Progride
1983	A Linguagem da Desordem
1984	Olhos Calcinados
1988	Archote Glaciar
1991	Arbítrio
1999	Marcas de Água
2004	Poesia Escolhida
2011	Y si Todo, de Repente? / Spanish anthology
2011	Desobediência

=== Fiction ===
Year	Title
2000	Persona, short stories
2007	Cidade Proibida, novel
2021	Devastação, short stories

=== Essay and critic ===
Year	Title
2002	Comenda de Fogo
2003	Fractura
2004	Metal Fundente
2007	Intriga em Família
2010	Intriga em Família
2014	Pompas Fúnebres

=== Memoir ===
Year	Title
2005	Os Dias de Veneza
2013	Cadernos Italianos
2013	Um Rapaz a Arder

=== Edited works ===
Year	Title
2008	Canções e Outros Poemas, António Botto
2008	Fátima, António Botto
2018	Poesia, António Botto's complete poetry

== Sources ==
- «A Linguagem da Desordem», review by Eugénio Lisboa, http://coloquio.gulbenkian.pt/bib/sirius.exe/getrec?mfn=4065&_template=singleRecord [archive]
- «A marca da excisão na poesia de Eduardo Pitta», review by Ana Luísa Amaral. http://coloquio.gulbenkian.pt/bib/sirius.exe/getrec?mfn=7942&_template=singleRecord [archive]
- «Persona», review by Fernando Matos Oliveira, http://coloquio.gulbenkian.pt/bib/sirius.exe/getrec?mfn=8233&_template=singleRecord [archive]
- «Pompas Fúnebres», review by Hugo Pinto Santos, http://coloquio.gulbenkian.pt/bib/sirius.exe/getrec?mfn=18876&_template=singleRecord [archive]
