= Viscount of Ovar =

Portuguese noble title

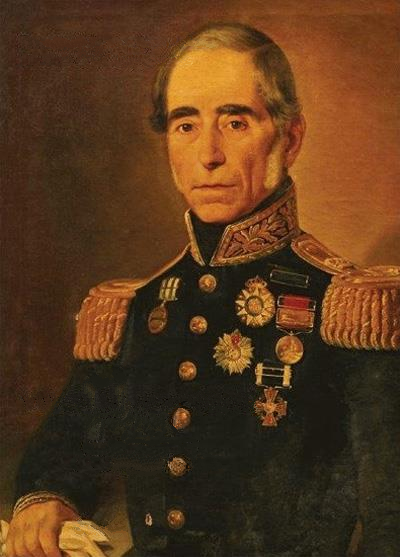
- António do Nascimento da Costa e Silva, 1st Viscount of Ovar
- Creation date: 25 July 1849
- Created by: Maria II of Portugal
- Peerage: Peerage of Portugal
- First holder: António do Nascimento da Costa e Silva

The Viscount of Ovar (Visconde de Ovar) is a Portuguese noble title created by decree on 25 July 1849 by Queen Maria II of Portugal in favour of António do Nascimento da Costa e Silva, a military officer and political figure of the 19th century.

== 1st Viscount: António do Nascimento da Costa e Silva (1782–1856) ==
António do Nascimento da Costa e Silva was born in Ovar on 25 December 1782, the son of José da Costa e Silva and Leandra Pereira Ramos.

He studied law and humanities at the University of Coimbra between 1798 and 1801, learning Latin, French, philosophy, and rhetoric, before beginning a military career in the Royal Court Artillery Regiment in September 1801. There he studied fortification and drawing, and briefly taught Portuguese grammar at the Colégio Militar.

=== Peninsular War ===
Costa e Silva saw active service during the Peninsular War (1807–1814), participating in the defense of Portugal against the French invasions. He commanded artillery units at major engagements including Buçaco (1810), Fuentes de Oñoro (1811), the siege of Ciudad Rodrigo (1812, where he was wounded), Salamanca (1812), Vitoria (1813), the Pyrenees campaign, and the final battles in southern France such as Orthez and Toulouse (1814).

He was commended several times, including by the Duke of Wellington, and received the Portuguese gold medal of the Peninsular War (Cruz n.º 6), awarded for participating in six campaigns. According to the Academia Militar biography, his cooperation with British and German officers contributed to the modernization of Portuguese field artillery.

=== Liberal Wars ===
During the Portuguese Civil War (1828–1834), Costa e Silva fought for the liberal cause. Initially based in Faro, he joined uprisings against absolutist forces and was forced into exile after the triumph of D. Miguel in Lisbon. He reorganized artillery in the Azores and took part in the Battle of Praia da Vitória (1829). In July 1832, he landed with the liberal expeditionary army at Mindelo and defended Porto during the year-long Siege of Porto, being wounded multiple times.

For his conduct he was promoted to colonel, decorated with the Order of the Tower and Sword, and later commanded the 1st Artillery Regiment. He was also made a Commander of the Military Order of Aviz in 1833 for his services to Queen Maria II and the constitutionalist cause.

=== Later career and honors ===
After 1834 Costa e Silva continued to serve in high command positions, including Inspector-General of the Army Arsenal (1836) and Commander-General of the Artillery (1840). He played a role in suppressing several uprisings in Lisbon and northern Portugal, and declined invitations to take ministerial posts.

In recognition of his service, Queen Maria II created him Baron of Ovar in 1841 and elevated him to Viscount of Ovar in 1849. That same year he became a Peer of the Realm and later served briefly as Minister of War between January and April 1847 during the Patuleia. He was promoted to Tenente-General in 1852.

=== Death ===
Costa e Silva died in Lisbon on 8 July 1856 of cholera, coincidentally on the anniversary of his 1832 landing at Mindelo. He was buried at the Cemitério do Alto de São João with national military honors, including artillery salutes and the attendance of the Duke of Terceira, his former commander during the liberal wars.

== Chalet Ficalho ==
The Chalet Ficalho, originally named Chalet Costa e Silva, is a historic summer residence in Cascais, built (or completed) in 1898 for the Viscount of Ovar and his wife, Maria Josefa de Mello, later known as the Countess of Ficalho.

Designed by architect Manuel Ferreira dos Santos, it reflects the Swiss architectural style popular in aristocratic summer homes of late 19th-century Portugal.

Located along what became known as the summer route for the Portuguese royal court, the chalet was commissioned to provide a retreat for the Viscount's daughter, Helena Mello da Costa, who suffered from respiratory problems; contemporary accounts cited sea air as a medical recommendation at the time.

Throughout the 20th century, the chalet experienced periods of abandonment (notably after the 1908 regicide and the exile of the family), before being rehabilitated and reimagined as a boutique guesthouse while retaining much of its original character and design ethos.

In 2023, this restoration earned the Maria Tereza and Vasco Vilalva Prize from the Calouste Gulbenkian Foundation, awarded for the conservation and reuse of heritage buildings.

== Later holders ==
After the creation of the title in 1849, it continued within the Do Nascimento Costa e Silva family.

A 2015 biography of the first viscount records Daniel do Nascimento Costa as the 9th Viscount of Ovar.

Noble titles in Portugal lost official recognition with the establishment of the republic in 1910, but genealogical and biographical works continue to make reference to them.

== Legacy ==
The legacy of the 1st Viscount of Ovar, António do Nascimento da Costa e Silva, includes military service in the Peninsular War, leadership during Portugal's liberal era, and civic ties to his native Ovar. Ovar News describes him as a significant military-political figure in 19th-century Portugal, particularly for his command in artillery, his role in the Liberal Wars, and his involvement in constitutionalist reforms.
