= Casa de São Bernardo =

Building in Cascais, Lisbon, Portugal

Coordinates: 38.6920°N 9.4208°W

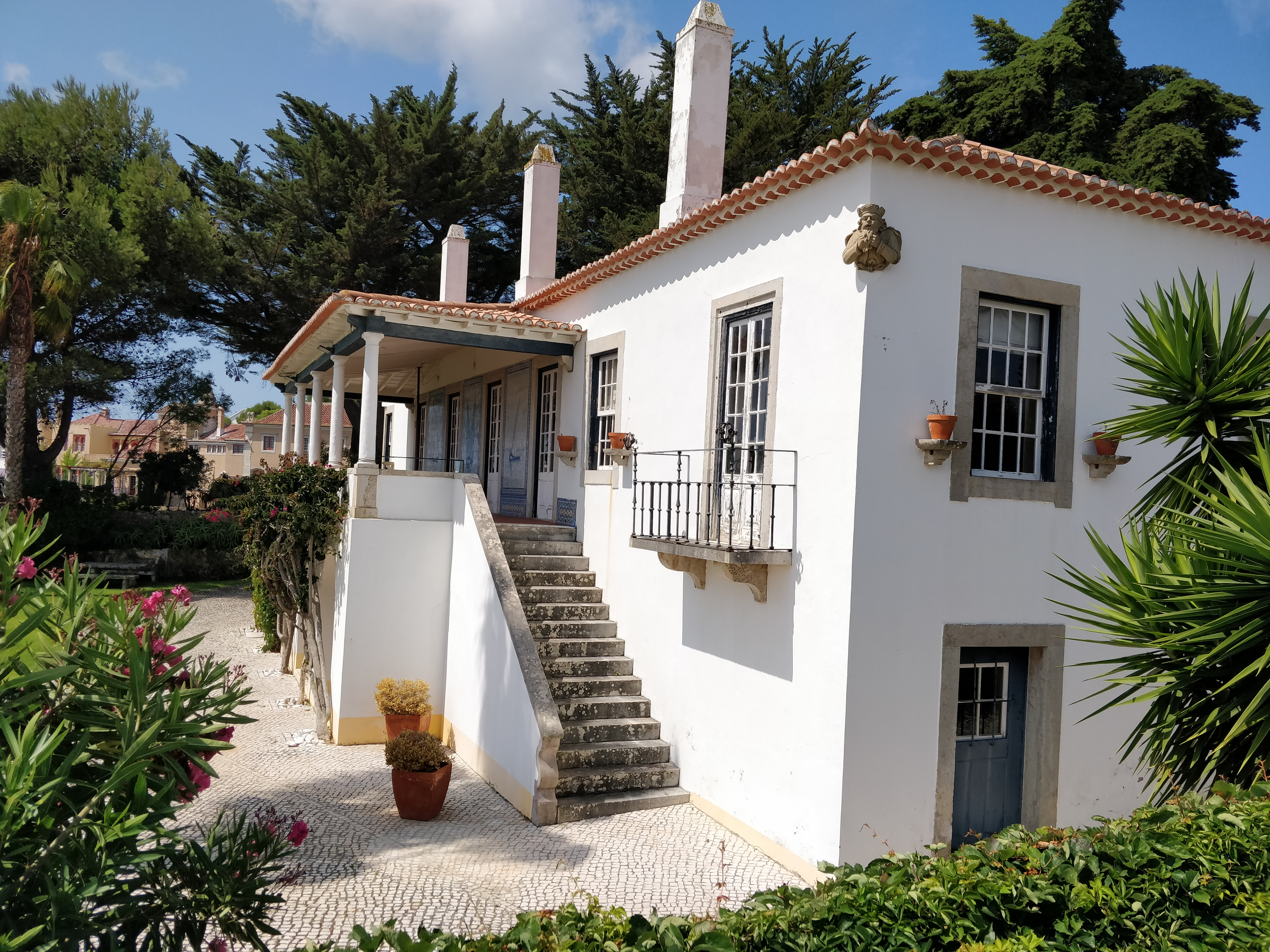
Casa de São Bernardo from the back

Casa de São Bernardo is a building in Cascais in the Lisbon District of Portugal that was owned by Bernardo Pinheiro Correia de Melo, First Count of Arnoso, who was private secretary to King Carlos. It is considered to be an example of the summer architecture found in Cascais and neighbouring Estoril from the 1870s onwards. The building was designed in 1890 but not completed until 1902.

The Casa de São Bernardo was called the "Minho house" as its design is reminiscent of the buildings found in Minho Province in the north of Portugal, where Correia de Melo was born, and was the first of the summer architecture buildings to be built in what was regarded as "Portuguese style". It was sometimes used for dinners of the Vencidos da Vida (Life's Vanquished), a group of intellectuals that included the novelists José Maria de Eça de Queirós and Ramalho Ortigão, as well as Correia de Melo. Eça de Queirós would often stay at the house. Although not considered a member, King Carlos would sometimes join them for dinner. The King, who was an enthusiastic watercolour artist, would occasionally paint at the house.

Casa de São Bernardo is now owned by the Cascais Marina.
