= Alvega =

Former civil parish in Portugal

- Civil parish
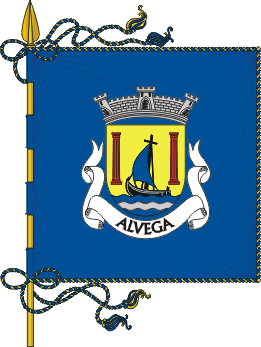
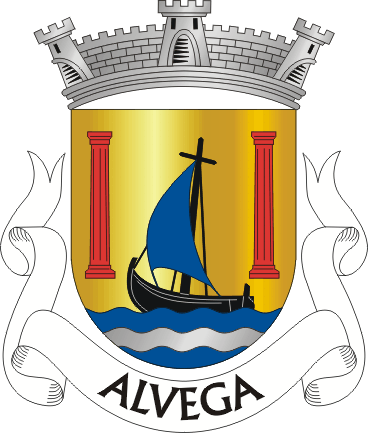
- Flag Coat of arms

- Location in Portugal
- Coordinates: 39.4653°N 8.0457°W
- Country: Portugal
- Region: Oeste e Vale do Tejo
- Intermunic. comm.: Médio Tejo
- District: Santarém
- Municipality: Abrantes
- Disbanded: 2013

Area
  - Total: 55.33 km^{2} (21.36 sq mi)

Population (2011)
  - Total: 1,499
  - Density: 27.09/km^{2} (70.17/sq mi)
- Time zone: UTC+00:00 (WET)
  - Summer (DST): UTC+01:00 (WEST)
- Area code: 241

Alvega is a former freguesia ("civil parish"), located in the municipality of Abrantes, in Santarém District, Portugal. In 2013, the parish merged into the new parish Alvega e Concavada. The population in 2011 was 1,499, in an area of 55.33 km².

== History ==
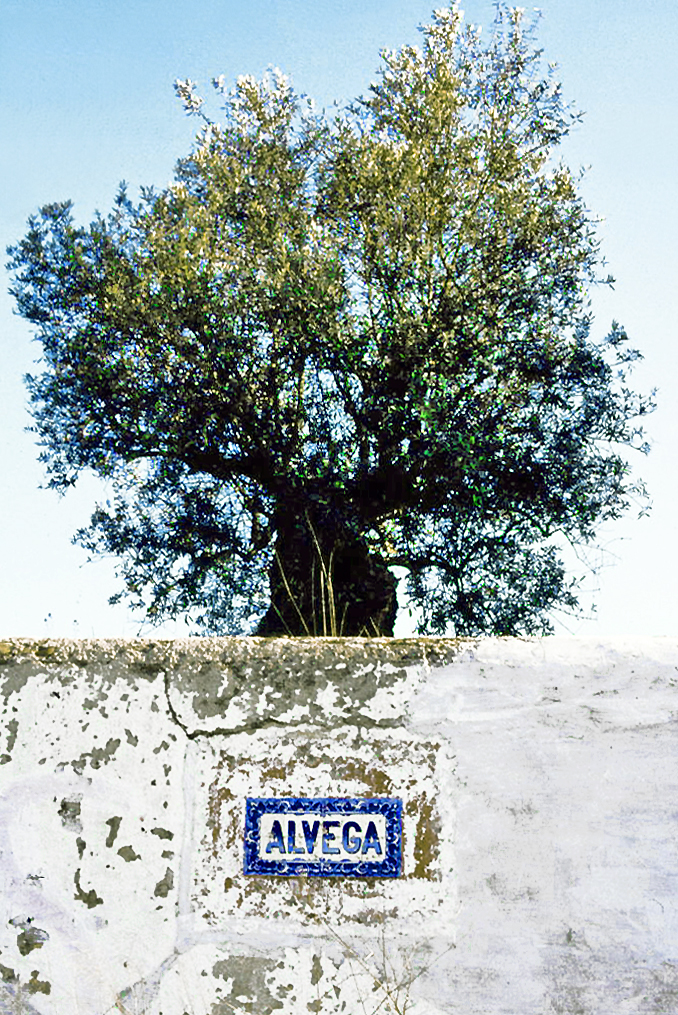
Alvega, 1980

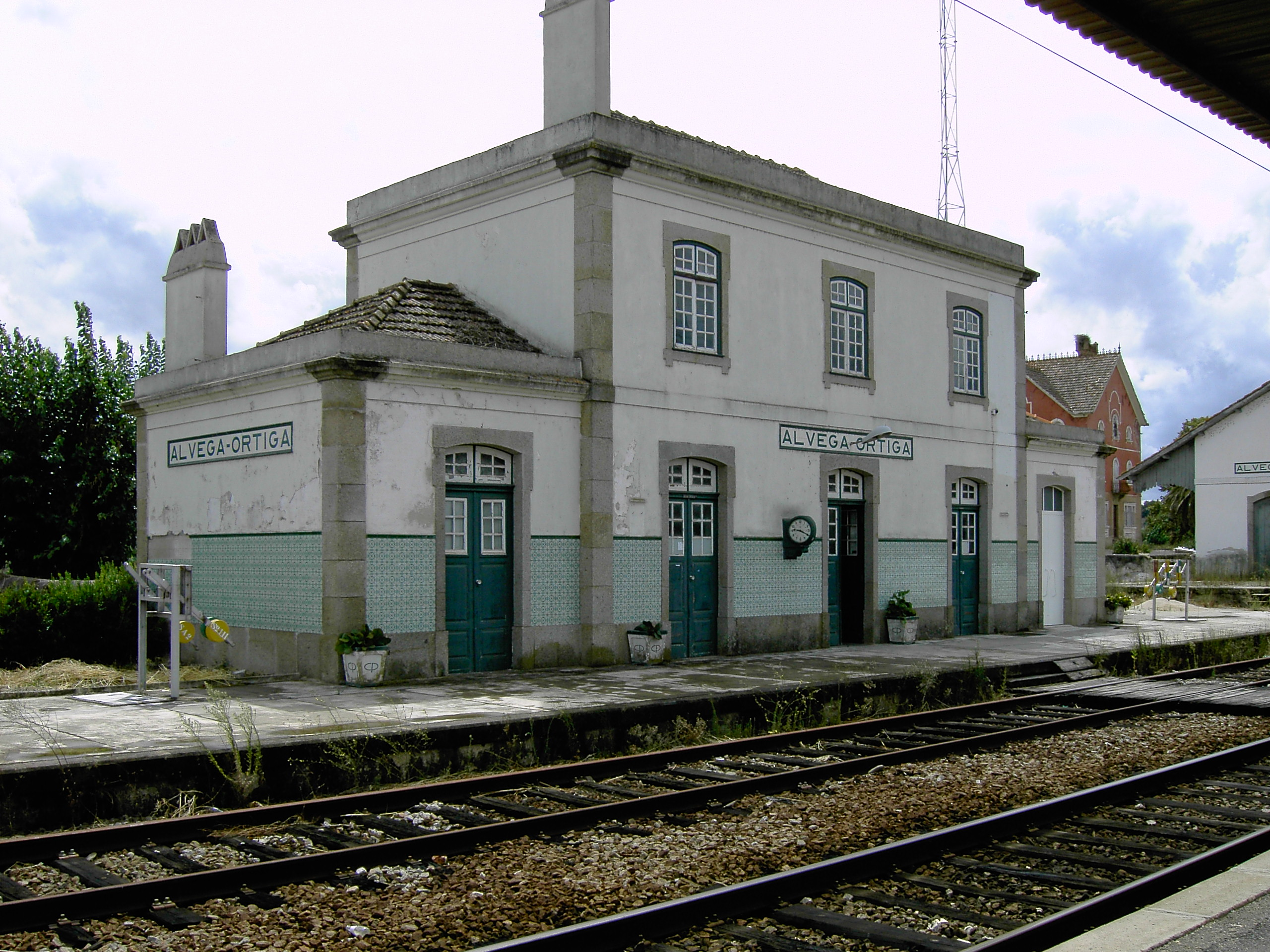
Alvega-Ortiga Railway Station, located on the other side of the Tagus

On top of a hilltop encountered 300 metres (980 ft) to the southwest of the confluence of the Tagus River with the Lampreia River, in the area of Barca de Bandos, are the ruins of a fortress. The vestiges of the surface area indicate the presence of the Phoenicians and Greeks.

By the time the Romans began occupying the Iberian peninsula around 130, the area was already an important community, designated Ayre or Aritium, with river port that provided a military connection between Lisbon and Mérida. The destruction of the Roman fort was attributed to the invasion of Vandals, on their way to Andalusia. Of this Roman civitas there are still some buildings, house foundations and graves, underground galleries, likely the ruins of an aqueduct, military roads, and along the Tagus, there are markers to indicate a Roman bridge.

During the Muslim occupation the city continued to support a populous community. The toponymy, Alvega, came from the Arab name Alrega, with its history extending as far back as the Muslim occupation of Hispania.

== Geography ==
The parish is located in the easternmost tip of the municipality, neighbouring with the municipalities of Mação to the north, with Gavião to the east and with Ponte de Sor to the south.

The parish includes the localities of Alvega, Areia de Baixo, Areia de Cima, Casa Branca, Casal Ventoso, Lampreia, Monte Galego, Portelas and Tubaral.

It is situated on the left margin of the Tagus River, 17 kilometres (11 mi) from the municipal seat of Abrantes. It is the centre of the Beira Baixa rail-line, in addition to having two river ports along the Tagus in Alvega and Barca de Bandos.

=== Climate ===
Alvega has a Mediterranean climate with hot, dry summers and mild to cool, wet winters. It has a very high diurnal temperature variation (especially in summer) due to its location in the Tagus floodplain and long distance from the Mediterranean Sea (which would otherwise increase nighttime temperatures) in low-latitude Southern Europe. The nights are cool, with an average yearly low of 8.5 °C (47.3 °F), and days are warm to hot, with an average yearly high of 23.9 °C (75.0 °F). The highest temperature recorded in Alvega was 46.8 °C (116.2 °F) on 4 August 2018 and the coldest was −7.5 °C (18.5 °F) on 2 February 1981. In July 2022, Alvega registered a mean maximum temperature of 39.6 °C (103.3 °F), which is the highest ever recorded in Portugal. Variations in daily temperature can occasionally surpass 30 °C (54 °F) in the summer. More recently, temperatures went from 10.9 °C (51.6 °F) on the night of 10 July 2021, to 42.1 °C (107.8 °F) on the same day.

Climate data for Alvega, 1991-2020 (with 2018 record high), altitude: 51 m (167 ft)
Month	Jan	Feb	Mar	Apr	May	Jun	Jul	Aug	Sep	Oct	Nov	Dec	Year
Record high °C (°F)	24.9 (76.8)	25.8 (78.4)	31.1 (88.0)	36.4 (97.5)	40.1 (104.2)	46.0 (114.8)	45.7 (114.3)	46.8 (116.2)	43.8 (110.8)	38.5 (101.3)	28.2 (82.8)	25.0 (77.0)	46.8 (116.2)
Mean daily maximum °C (°F)	15.1 (59.2)	17.0 (62.6)	20.3 (68.5)	22.0 (71.6)	26.0 (78.8)	30.3 (86.5)	33.3 (91.9)	33.8 (92.8)	30.2 (86.4)	24.6 (76.3)	18.5 (65.3)	15.4 (59.7)	23.9 (75.0)
Daily mean °C (°F)	8.9 (48.0)	9.9 (49.8)	12.7 (54.9)	14.7 (58.5)	17.9 (64.2)	21.5 (70.7)	23.8 (74.8)	24.0 (75.2)	21.2 (70.2)	17.3 (63.1)	12.4 (54.3)	9.8 (49.6)	16.2 (61.1)
Mean daily minimum °C (°F)	2.8 (37.0)	2.9 (37.2)	5.1 (41.2)	7.2 (45.0)	9.9 (49.8)	12.6 (54.7)	14.2 (57.6)	14.2 (57.6)	12.1 (53.8)	10.1 (50.2)	6.3 (43.3)	4.1 (39.4)	8.5 (47.2)
Record low °C (°F)	−7.3 (18.9)	−7.5 (18.5)	−6.5 (20.3)	−3.0 (26.6)	0.7 (33.3)	4.0 (39.2)	6.9 (44.4)	5.0 (41.0)	3.5 (38.3)	−0.6 (30.9)	−5.9 (21.4)	−6.0 (21.2)	−7.5 (18.5)
Average precipitation mm (inches)	82.5 (3.25)	61.8 (2.43)	66.3 (2.61)	64.2 (2.53)	53.7 (2.11)	14.8 (0.58)	4.3 (0.17)	6.3 (0.25)	32.0 (1.26)	98.8 (3.89)	100.4 (3.95)	85.2 (3.35)	670.3 (26.38)
Average precipitation days (≥ 1 mm)	9.8	7.4	7.9	8.1	6.8	2.4	0.7	1.4	4.2	8.9	9.9	9.4	76.9
Source: IPMA

Climate data for Alvega, 1971-2000, altitude: 51 m (167 ft)
Month	Jan	Feb	Mar	Apr	May	Jun	Jul	Aug	Sep	Oct	Nov	Dec	Year
Record high °C (°F)	22.5 (72.5)	25.5 (77.9)	30.2 (86.4)	34.0 (93.2)	36.5 (97.7)	42.5 (108.5)	44.0 (111.2)	42.5 (108.5)	42.5 (108.5)	34.5 (94.1)	27.5 (81.5)	25.0 (77.0)	44.0 (111.2)
Mean daily maximum °C (°F)	14.5 (58.1)	16.4 (61.5)	19.3 (66.7)	20.8 (69.4)	23.8 (74.8)	28.4 (83.1)	32.0 (89.6)	32.2 (90.0)	29.5 (85.1)	23.7 (74.7)	18.4 (65.1)	15.3 (59.5)	22.9 (73.1)
Daily mean °C (°F)	8.6 (47.5)	10.1 (50.2)	12.0 (53.6)	13.7 (56.7)	16.6 (61.9)	20.4 (68.7)	23.0 (73.4)	22.9 (73.2)	20.7 (69.3)	16.6 (61.9)	12.3 (54.1)	10.0 (50.0)	15.6 (60.0)
Mean daily minimum °C (°F)	2.7 (36.9)	3.9 (39.0)	4.6 (40.3)	6.7 (44.1)	9.4 (48.9)	12.3 (54.1)	14.0 (57.2)	13.6 (56.5)	12.0 (53.6)	9.4 (48.9)	6.2 (43.2)	4.6 (40.3)	8.3 (46.9)
Record low °C (°F)	−7.0 (19.4)	−7.5 (18.5)	−6.5 (20.3)	−3.0 (26.6)	0.0 (32.0)	4.0 (39.2)	7.0 (44.6)	5.0 (41.0)	2.0 (35.6)	−4.9 (23.2)	−7.0 (19.4)	−6.0 (21.2)	−7.5 (18.5)
Average precipitation mm (inches)	86.6 (3.41)	74.7 (2.94)	46.6 (1.83)	58.2 (2.29)	58.9 (2.32)	22.3 (0.88)	6.9 (0.27)	7.4 (0.29)	29.6 (1.17)	81.6 (3.21)	91.0 (3.58)	102.4 (4.03)	666.2 (26.22)
Average precipitation days (≥ 0.1 mm)	12.2	11.0	8.9	11.1	9.7	5.1	2.1	1.9	5.6	10.2	10.8	13.3	101.9
Source: IPMA

== Economy ==
Alvega is essentially rural, involved in the cultivation of cereal grains, cork and olive orchards, as well as the raising of goats and sheep. In addition to extraction of sand from the river, the fishery, horticulture and fructiculture, among other activities are important parts of the local primary sector economies.

Meanwhile, there are portions of the community involved in traditional tin, carpentry, tailoring and embroidery crafts, as a source of tourist dollars.
