= António Botto =

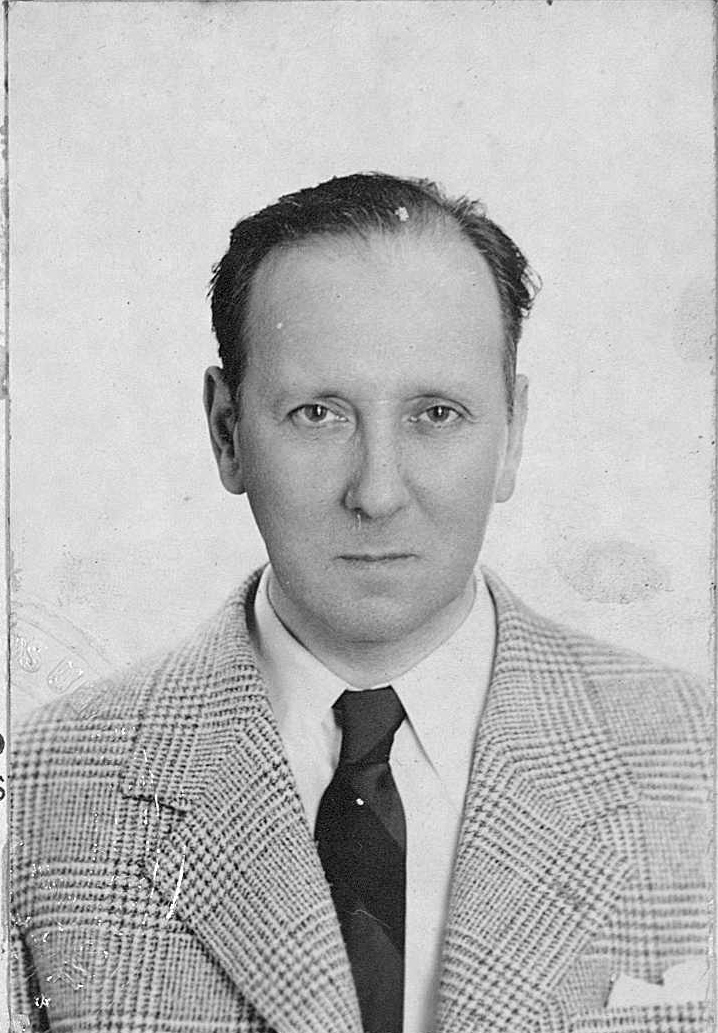
- António Botto in the 1940s
- Born: António Thomaz Botto; August 17, 1897; Concavada, Portugal
- Died: March 16, 1959 (aged 61); Rio de Janeiro, Brazil
- Occupation: Poet
- Spouse: Carminda da Conceição Silva Rodrigues (?–1959)
- Writing career
- Period: 1917–1955
- Genre: Lyricism
- Notable works: Canções; Os Contos de António Botto para Crianças e Adultos

António Botto (August 17, 1897 – March 16, 1959) was a Portuguese aesthete and lyricist poet.

== Early life ==
António Thomaz Botto was born on August 17, 1897 to Maria Pires Agudo and Francisco Thomaz Botto, in Concavada, Portugal, the couple's second son. His father earned his living as a boatman in the Tagus. In 1902 the family moved to Rua da Adiça, 22, 3rd floor, in the Alfama quarter in Lisbon (where a third and last son would be born). Botto grew up in the typical and popular atmosphere of that neighbourhood. Very old shabby houses, stretched up in steepy narrow streets, the ambiance was one of poverty and somewhat promiscuous. Small shops, small taverns where fado was sung late in the night. The dirty streets crowded with workers, housewives shopping, vendors, beggars, tramps, kids playing, pimps, prostitutes and sailors, which would deeply influence his work.

Botto was poorly educated and since youth he took to a series of menial jobs, among them that of a book-shop clerk. Probably his education came from reading the books he lay hands on during his daily work. He also got acquainted with many of Lisbon's men of letters due to his job. In his mid-twenties he got into civil service as a modest administrative clerk in several State offices. In 1924–25 he worked in Santo António do Zaire and Luanda, Angola, returning to Lisbon in 1925, where he stayed the remaining years as a civil servant up to 1942.

== The scandal of Canções ==
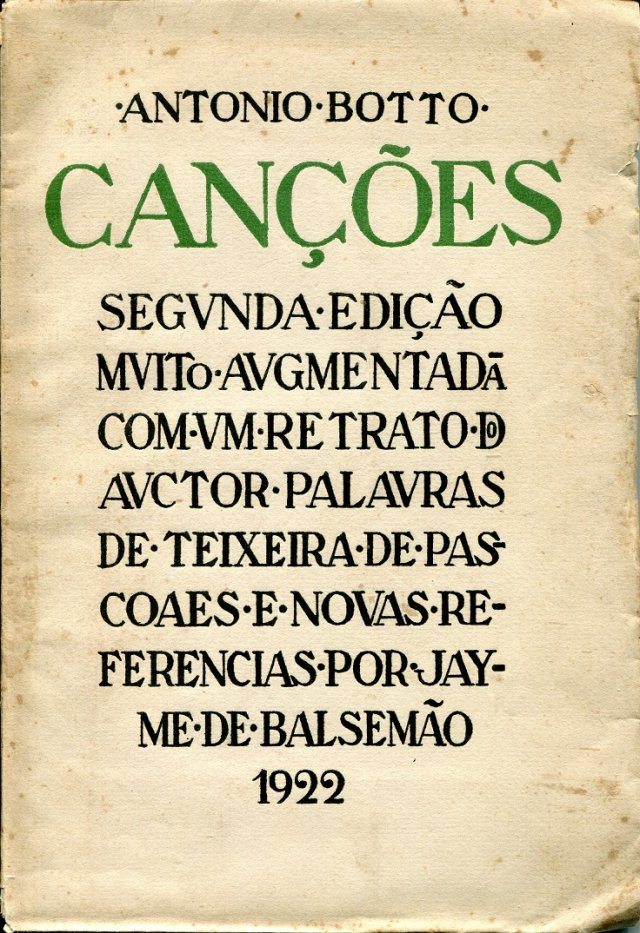
Canções, 2nd edition, 1922

His first book of poems Trovas was published in 1917. It was followed by Cantigas de Saudade (1918), Cantares (1919) and Canções do Sul (1920). Canções (Songs) was published in 1921 and went unnoticed. Only after Fernando Pessoa published its 2nd edition, through his publishing house "Olisipo", emerged a public scandal amongst the Lisbon society which granted Botto a lifelong notoriety: the author dared to write about same-sex love and in a very nonchalant and romantic way. Besides that, it featured a photograph of Botto in a camp, languid pose showing his bare shoulders.

To noise Botto's book, Pessoa wrote a provocative and encomiastic article about Canções, published in the journal Comtemporânea, praising the author's courage and sincerity for shamelessly singing homosexual love as a true aesthete. Pessoa's article had a contrary reply in the same journal by the critic Alvaro Maia, followed by another article by Raul Leal (an openly homosexual writer, friend of Pessoa).

Conservatives reacted and complained to the authorities about the work's immorality ("Sodom's literature") and the book was apprehended by the authorities in 1923. The Liga de Acção dos Estudantes de Lisboa [Lisbon Students Action League], a Catholic college students group (led by Pedro Teotónio Pereira) clamored for an auto-da-fé of Botto's book and someone even suggested the author should be hanged. Nevertheless, most artists and intellectuals, headed by Pessoa (a close friend of Botto's and also his publisher and later English translator), promptly took up his defence in several polemic articles.

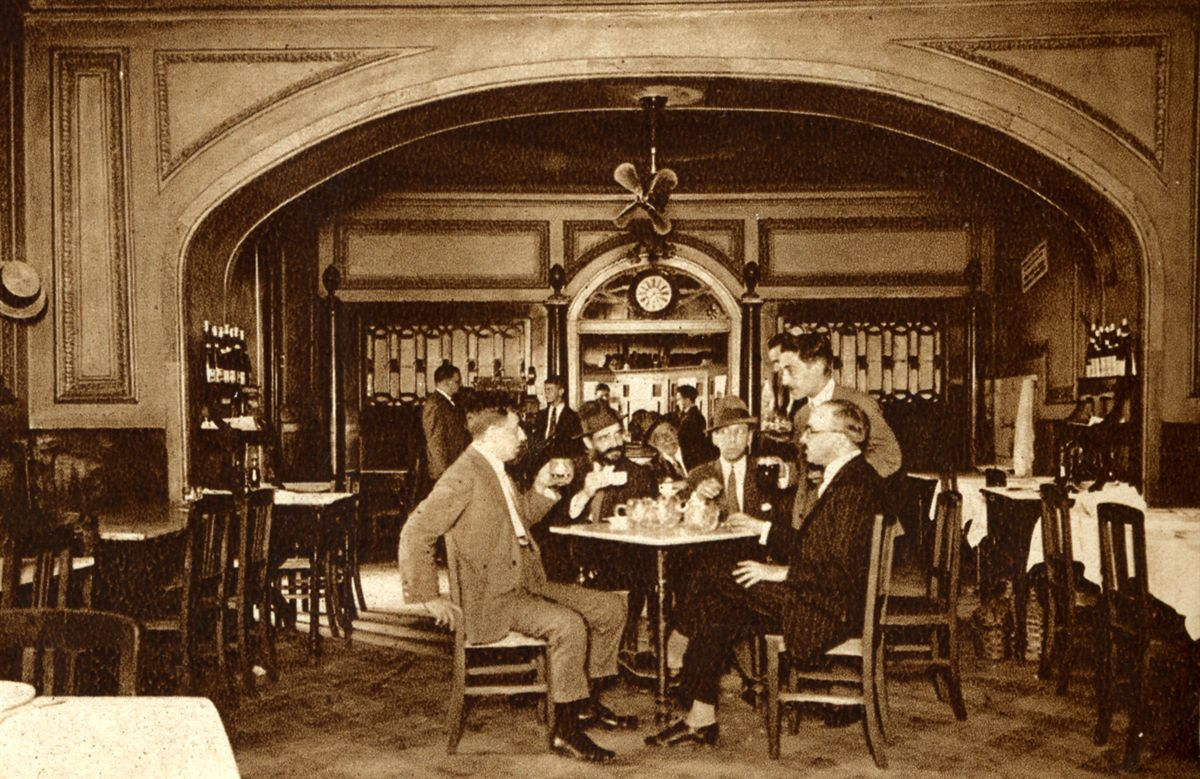
(Left to right): Unknown man, Raul Leal, António Botto, Augusto Ferreira Gomes (standing), Fernando Pessoa at the Café Martinho da Arcada, Lisbon, 1928

Eventually, the scandal subsided, the next year the ban was lifted and until the end of his life Botto would publish several revised versions of the book. It's true his work had been saluted by Teixeira de Pascoaes and José Régio, but praises from the likes of Antonio Machado, Miguel de Unamuno, Virginia Woolf, Luigi Pirandello, Stefan Zweig, Rudyard Kipling, James Joyce or Federico García Lorca, as he claimed, seem to have been a figment of Botto's very wild imagination.

== Personal life ==
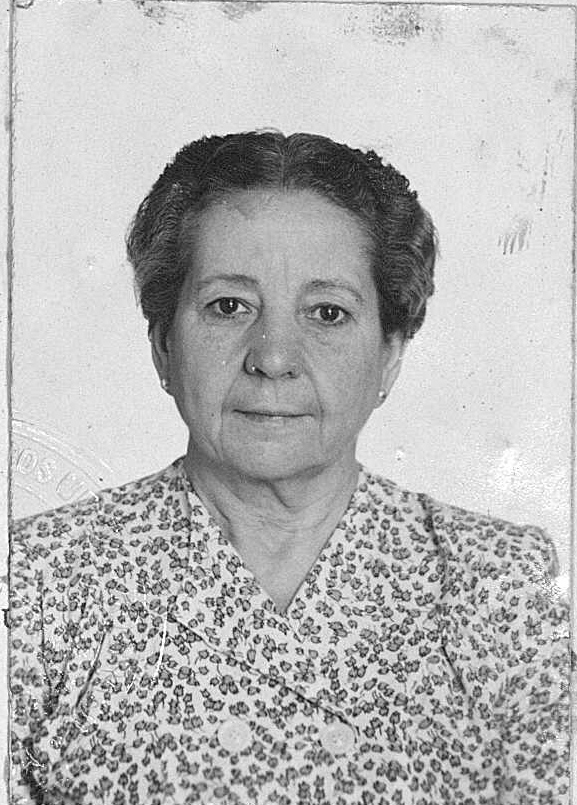
Carminda Rodrigues, Botto's common-law wife, 1940s

Botto was described as a slender, medium-height dandy, fastidiously dressed, oval-faced, a tiny mouth with thin pursed lips, strange, scrutinizing, ironic eyes (sometimes clouded by a disturbing malicious expression) hidden by an everpresent fedora. He had a sardonic sense of humour, a sharp, perverse and irreverent mind and tongue, and he was a brilliant and witty conversationalist. He also reveled in indiscreet gossiping. Some of his contemporaries said he was frivolous, mercurial, mundane, uneducated, vindictive, a mythomaniac and, above all, vain and narcissistic to the point of megalomania.

Botto's mythomania seems to have been a lifelong trait of his. He talked about unlikely friendships with people like Vaslav Nijinsky, Federico García Lorca or André Gide. On the other hand, he never alluded to his modest background or ever talked about his parents or brothers.

He was a regular visitor of Lisbon's popular bohemian quarters and the docks, enjoying the company of sailors, a frequent image in his poems. In spite of a homosexual fame, he had a lifelong and fully devoted common-law wife, Carminda da Conceição Silva Rodrigues, a widow, nine years his elder. "Marriage suits every handsome and decadent man", he once wrote.

== Expelled from job ==
On November 9, 1942 Botto was expelled from the civil service for

i) disobeying orders from a superior;
ii) for wooing a male co-worker and addressing to him ambiguous words, denouncing tendencies condemned by the social morals;
iii) for writing and reciting verses during the working hours, disrupting discipline at the workplace.

When he read the humiliating public announcement in the official gazette he was totally disheartened, but commented ironically: "Now I'm Portugal's only acknowledged homosexual."

He tried to earn his livelihood from the royalties of his books and by writing articles, columns and criticism in newspapers. He also wrote several other works, among them Os Contos de António Botto and O Livro das Crianças, a best-seller collection of short stories for children that would be officially approved as school reading in Ireland (The Children’s Book, translated by Alice Lawrence Oram).

But this proved insufficient. His health was deteriorating from tertiary syphilis (of which he refused treatment) and the brilliance of his poetry was fading away. He was jeered at any time he entered cafés, bookshops or theatres by homophobes. He was fed up with living in Portugal and in 1947 he decided to move to Brazil, hoping for a new beginning. To raise funds for his trip in May he gave two large poetry recitals in Lisbon and Porto. They were a big success, and he was largely praised by several artists and intellectuals, among them Amália Rodrigues, João Villaret and the writer Aquilino Ribeiro. On 5 August 1947, Botto and his wife sailed to Brazil aboard the Juan de Garay liner.

== Years in Brazil and death ==
Botto arrived in Rio de Janeiro the day he turned 50, 17 August 1947. He was very well received by the Portuguese community and cherished by local intellectuals like Pompeu de Souza, Macedo Soares, Horácio de Carvalho, Vinicius de Morais or Danton Jobim. The Academia de Letras do Rio de Janeiro received him with welcoming speeches by João Neves Fontoura and Manuel Bandeira. The press of Rio, São Paulo, Recife, Ceará, Baía, was laudatory about him calling him the greatest Portuguese poet alive and publishing encomiastic articles by well-known Brazilian writers. He was invited to banquets, receptions and tribute meetings.

He resided in São Paulo until 1951 and then moved to Rio de Janeiro. He survived on his meager royalties and by writing articles and columns in Portuguese and Brazilian newspapers, doing some radio shows and poetry readings in theatres, associations, clubs and, finally, cheap taverns.

He was doing badly day by day and he ended up living in very shabby conditions (sometimes the couple resorted to feed on flour mixed with water). Always on the move, changing hotels, boarding houses, apartments. Many times he had to loan from friends, which very rarely if ever were refunded by him. His megalomania (due to syphilis) was rampant and he told delirious, outlandish tales like the one of being visited in Lisbon by Mário de Andrade. When they told him Andrade never went to Portugal, Botto retorted "If it was not him then it was Gide or Proust". He also claimed things like being the greatest living poet in the world and that he was the owner of São Paulo. In 1954 he asked to be repatriated, but his request was rejected and he finally gave up returning to his home country because he lacked the means. (For that purpose he even tried to get into the good graces of Cardinal Cerejeira, writing a book of very mediocre poetry entitled Fátima.) In 1956 he fell seriously ill and was hospitalised for a time.

On the evening of March 4, 1959, on the way to meet a lawyer friend while crossing the Nossa Senhora de Copacabana Avenue, in Rio de Janeiro, he was run over by a State's motor vehicle and he got a broken skull, going into a coma. He died on March 16, 1959, around 5:00 pm, in the Hospital Sousa Dias. In 1965 his remains were transferred to Lisbon and since 11 November 1966 they are buried in the Alto de São João Cemetery. By that time, his widow also sent Botto's archives to a Portuguese relative of hers who later donated them to Lisbon's Biblioteca Nacional in 1989.

== Bibliography ==
1917 – Trovas (poems)

1918 – Cantiga de Saudade (poems)

1919 – Cantares (poems)

1920 – Canções do Sul (poems), com um estudo de Jayme de Balsemão, Lisbon, Agartha Press.

1921 – Canções (poems), preface by Teixeira de Pascoaes, Lisbon, Agartha Press.

1922 – Canções, 2nd edition, Lisbon, Olisipo (until 1956, under the title As Canções de António Botto, this book will have several revised and augmented editions by the author. Critics say the last credible one is that of 1932, the following ones being increasingly worse in quality).

1924 – Curiosidades Estéticas (poems)

1925 – Piquenas Esculturas (poems)

1927 – Olimpíadas (poems)

1928 – Dandysmo (poems)

1929 – Antologia de Poemas Portugueses Modernos (with Fernando Pessoa)

1931 – O Livro das Crianças (children short stories)

1933 – Alfama (theatre); António (theatre)

1934 – O Meu Amor Pequenino (short stories); Ciúme (poems)

1935 – Dar de Beber a Quem Tem Sede (short stories); A Verdade e Nada Mais (children anthology); The Children's Book, translated by Alice Lawrence Oram; illustrated by Carlos Botelho, Lisbon: Bertrand & Irmãos.

1938 – A Vida Que Te Dei (poemas); Os Sonetos de António Botto (poems)

1940 – O Barco Voador (short stories); Isto Sucedeu Assim (novel)

1941 – OLeabhar na hÓige. Scéalta ón bPortaingéilis. Oifig an tSolatháir: Baile Átha Cliath (short stories with illustrations, Irish translation of Os Contos de António Botto para Crianças e Adultos)

1942 – Os Contos de António Botto para Crianças e Adultos (short stories)

1943 – A Guerra dos Macacos (short stories)

1945 – As Comédias de António Botto (theatre)

1947 – Ódio e Amor (poems)

1948 – Songs (English translation by Fernando Pessoa of Canções)

1953 – Histórias do Arco da Velha (children's stories)

1955 – Teatro; Fátima Poema do Mundo

1999 – As Canções de António Botto, Presença, Lisbon, 1999 (out-of-print)

2008 – Canções e outros poemas, Quasi Edições, Lisbon, 2008

2008 – Fátima, Quasi Edições, Lisbon, 2008

2010 – Canções: António Botto. Tradução para o inglês: Fernando Pessoa. Edição, prefácio e notas: Jerónimo Pizarro e Nuno Ribeiro. Babel, Lisbon, 2010. (Comprises the English translation by Fernando Pessoa)

2010 – The Songs of António Botto translated by Fernando Pessoa. Edited and with an introduction by Josiah Blackmore. University of Minnesota Press, Minneapolis, 2010

2018 - Poesia. Lisbon: Assírio & Alvim, 2018. Edited by Eduardo Pitta, a complete collection of Botto's poetry published in his lifetime, from 1921 to 1959, a total of 22 books: the fifteen from Canções: Adolescente / Curiosidades Estéticas / Piquenas Esculturas / Olimpíadas / Dandismo / Ciúme / Baionetas da Morte / Piquenas Canções de Cabaret / Intervalo / Aves de Um Parque Real / Poema de Cinza / Tristes Cantigas de Amor / A Vida Que Te Dei / Sonetos / Toda a Vida —, and also Motivos de Beleza, Cartas Que Me Foram Devolvidas, Cantares, O Livro do Povo, Ódio e Amor, Fátima. Poema do Mundo, and the unpublished Ainda Não Se Escreveu. This 815 pages volume also includes the poems Botto wrote for the film Gado Bravo (1934), directed by António Lopes Ribeiro.

== Further reading (chronological order) ==
- Pessoa, Fernando: "António Botto e o Ideal Estético em Portugal", Contemporanea, nr. 3, July 1922, pp. 121–126
- Maia, Álvaro: "Literatura de Sodoma - o Senhor Fernando Pessoa e o Ideal Estético em Portugal", Contemporanea, nr. 4, October 1922, pp. 31–35
- Leal, Raul: Sodoma Divinizada (Leves reflexões teometafísicas sobre um artigo), February 1923
- Liga de Acção dos Estudantes de Lisboa: Manifesto dos Estudantes das Escolas Superiores de Lisboa, March 1923
- Campos, Álvaro de (Fernando Pessoa): Aviso por Causa da Moral, March 1923
- Leal, Raul: Uma Lição de Moral aos Estudantes de Lisboa e o Descaramento da Igreja Católica, March 1923
- Pessoa, Fernando: Sobre um Manifesto dos Estudantes, March 1923
- Régio, José: "António Botto", Presença, nr. 13, June 13, 1928, pp. 4–5
- Simões, João Gaspar: "António Botto e o problema da Sinceridade", Presença, nr. 24, January 1930, pp. 2–3
- Régio, José: "O poeta António Botto e o seu novo livro Ciúme", Diário de Lisboa, July 21, 1934
- Colaço, Tomás Ribeiro: "António Botto - um poeta que não existe", Fradique, July 26, 1934 (a polemic ensues with José Régio until March 1935)
- Régio, José: António Botto e o Amor, 1938
- Régio, José: "Evocando um Poeta", Diário de Notícias, September 19, 1957
- Rodrigues, José Maria: "A verdade sobre António Botto", Século Ilustrado, March 21, 19 (last interview with A. Botto)
- Simões, João Gaspar: Vida e Obra de Fernando Pessoa, Lisbon, 1950
- Simões, João Gaspar: Retratos de Poetas que Conheci, Brasília Editora, Porto, 1974
- Almeida, L.P. Moitinho de: Fernando Pessoa no cinquentenário da sua morte, Coimbra Editora, Coimbra, 1985
- Cesariny, Mário: O Virgem Negra, Assírio e Alvim, Lisbon, 1989
- Leal, Raul: Sodoma Divinizada (antologia de textos organizada por Aníbal Fernandes), Hiena Editora, Lisbon, 1989
- "António Botto, Cem Anos de Maldição" (a dossier about Botto by several authors on celebration of his 100th anniversary), JL - Jornal de Letras, Artes e Ideias, nr. 699, July 30-August 12, 1997, Lisbon.
- Sales, António Augusto: António Botto - Real e Imaginário, Livros do Brasil, Lisbon, 1997
- Fernandes, Maria da Conceição: António Botto - um Poeta de Lisboa - Vida e Obra. Novas Contribuições, Minerva, Lisbon, 1998
- Amaro, Luís: António Botto - 1897-1959 (Catálogo), Biblioteca Nacional, Lisbon, 1999
- Dacosta, Fernando: Máscaras de Salazar, Casa das Letras, Lisbon, 2006
- Almeida, São José: Homossexuais no Estado Novo, Sextante, Lisbon, 2010
- Leal, Raul: Sodoma Divinizada. Organização, introdução e cronologia: Aníbal Fernandes. Babel, Lisbon, 2010
- Gonçalves, Zetho Cunha: Notícia do maior escândalo erótico-social do século XX em Portugal, Letra Livre, Lisbon, 2014
- Klobucka, Anna M. O Mundo Gay de António Botto. Lisbon: Sistema Solar, 2018. 272 p.; ISBN 978-989-8902-16-0

== See also ==
- Fernando Pessoa
- Portuguese poetry
