= Henrique de Sommer =

Henrique de Araújo de Sommer
- Born: January 29, 1886; Lisbon
- Died: March 28, 1944 (aged 58); Cascais

Henrique de Araújo de Sommer (Lisbon, 29 January 1886 — Cascais, 28 March 1944) was one of Portugal's most important industrialists.

He was a member of a German aristocratic family living in Portugal, since his grandfather Heinrich Baron von Sommer joined the armies of D. Pedro IV of Portugal, married a Portuguese lady and started a company - Casa Sommer & Cia. dedicated to importing iron.

Henrique de Sommer, after commercial studies in England, was called at the age of 26 to manage his family businesses.

He started the production of Portland cement at the Maceira Liz factory in 1923, being still remembered for his social work, and the out of ordinary working conditions for the factory workers.

With the acquisition of the Companhia de Cimentos Tejo in 1935 he became Portugal's main cement producer.

He experimented with the Basset method of iron ingot, but met with little success, having set along with a project of expansion of his cement production to Mozambique the path that would later be followed by his nephew António Champalimaud.

He had no children, and the division of his inheritance among his nephews and niece was sadly known as the Sommer Inheritance Case, the longest lawsuit in Portuguese history.

== See also ==
- Casa Sommer

== Bibliography ==
- Canha, Isabel; Fernandes, Filipe (2011). António Champalimaud : construtor de impérios : biografia. Lisboa: Esfera dos Livros. ISBN 978-989-626-310-2. OCLC 756771514.
