= Alvega e Concavada =

Civil parish in Portugal

- Civil parish
- Location in Portugal
- Coordinates: 39.46°N 8.06°W
- Country: Portugal
- Region: Oeste e Vale do Tejo
- Intermunic. comm.: Médio Tejo
- District: Santarém
- Municipality: Abrantes

Area
  - Total: 75.85 km^{2} (29.29 sq mi)

Population (2011)
  - Total: 2,152
  - Density: 28.37/km^{2} (73.48/sq mi)
- Time zone: UTC+00:00 (WET)
  - Summer (DST): UTC+01:00 (WEST)

Union of Parishes of Alvega e Concavada is a freguesia ("parish") in the municipality of Abrantes, Portugal. It was formed in 2013 by the merger of the former parishes Alvega and Concavada. The population in 2011 was 2,152, in an area of 75.85 km^{2} (29.29 sq mi).
