= Palace of the Dukes of Palmela =

- Palácio dos Duques de Palmela (Portuguese)
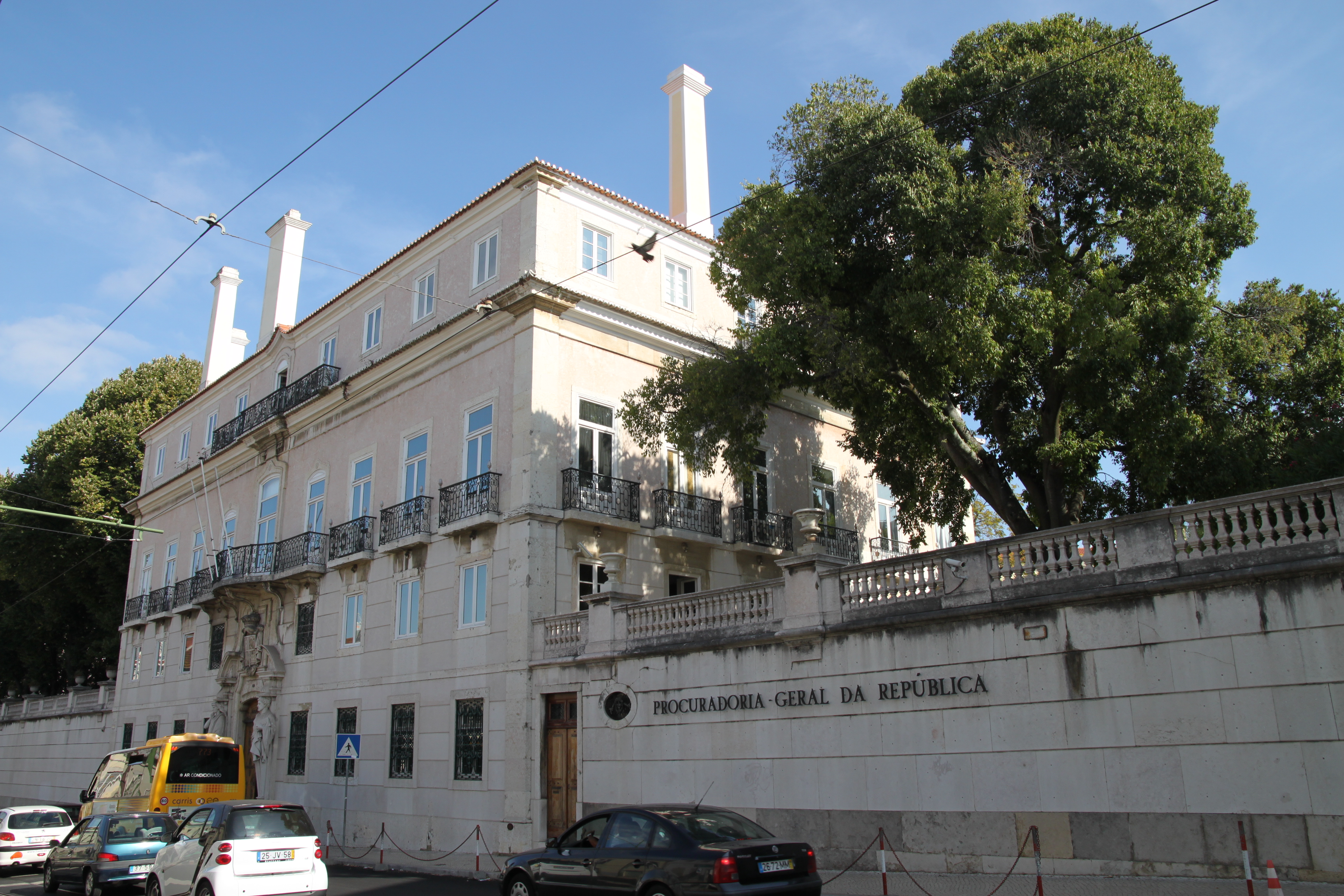
- Palace of the Dukes of Palmela

- Location within Portugal
- 38°43′10″N 9°09′12″W
- Location: Lisbon, Portugal

Portuguese National Monument
- Official name: Palácio Palmela, Incluindo o Jardim-Terraço
- Type: Property of Interest

The Palace of the Dukes of Palmela (Portuguese: Palácio dos Duques de Palmela) is a Portuguese palace located in Lisbon, Portugal.

== The Palace ==
The Palace of the Dukes of Palmela dates from the late 18th century, having been designed by Manuel Caetano de Sousa in the year 1792. Since then, the palace has undergone several renovations in its long history.

The façade of the palace has rectangular windows, which are barred completely with the wrought iron balconies on the third floor of the façade. The main entrance to the palace is guarded by the presence of two larger than life sculptures on either side of the door and the coat of arms of the Dukes of Palmela above.

In 1977, the palace was acquired by the Portuguese government.

In 1981 the building suffered a fire that destroyed the palace's chapel.

The palace is currently the headquarters of the Portuguese Attorney General's Office.

== See also ==
Palmela Palace (Cascais)

== Sources ==
- Palácio Palmela (In Portuguese)
- Palmela (Palácio) (In Portuguese)
