= List of Portuguese architects =

The following is a list of architects from the country of Portugal.

- Nadir Afonso (1920–2013)
- Carlos Amarante (1748–1815)
- João Antunes (1642–1712)
- Diogo de Arruda (before 1490–1531)
- Diogo de Boitaca (c. 1460–1528?)
- Cassiano Branco (1897–1970)
- Gonçalo Byrne (b. 1941)
- João Luís Carrilho da Graça (b. 1952)
- Jorge Ferreira Chaves (1920–1981)
- Pancho Guedes (1925–2015)
- Francisco Keil do Amaral (1910–1975)
- Raul Lino (1879–1974)
- José Marques da Silva (1869–1947)
- Maria José Marques da Silva (1914–1996)
- Filipe Oliveira Dias (1963–2014)
- Jacobetty Rosa (1901–1970)
- João Santa-Rita (b. 1960)
- Álvaro Siza (b. 1933), Pritzker Prize winner
- Eduardo Souto de Moura (b.1952), Pritzker Prize winner
- Tomás Taveira (b. 1938)
- Fernando Távora (1923–2005)
- Pedro Nunes Tinoco (d. 1641)
- Ana Louisa Soares (b. 1988)

== See also ==
- Architecture of Portugal
- List of architects
- List of Portuguese people
