= Raul Lino =

Raul Lino ComC GOSE ComCS
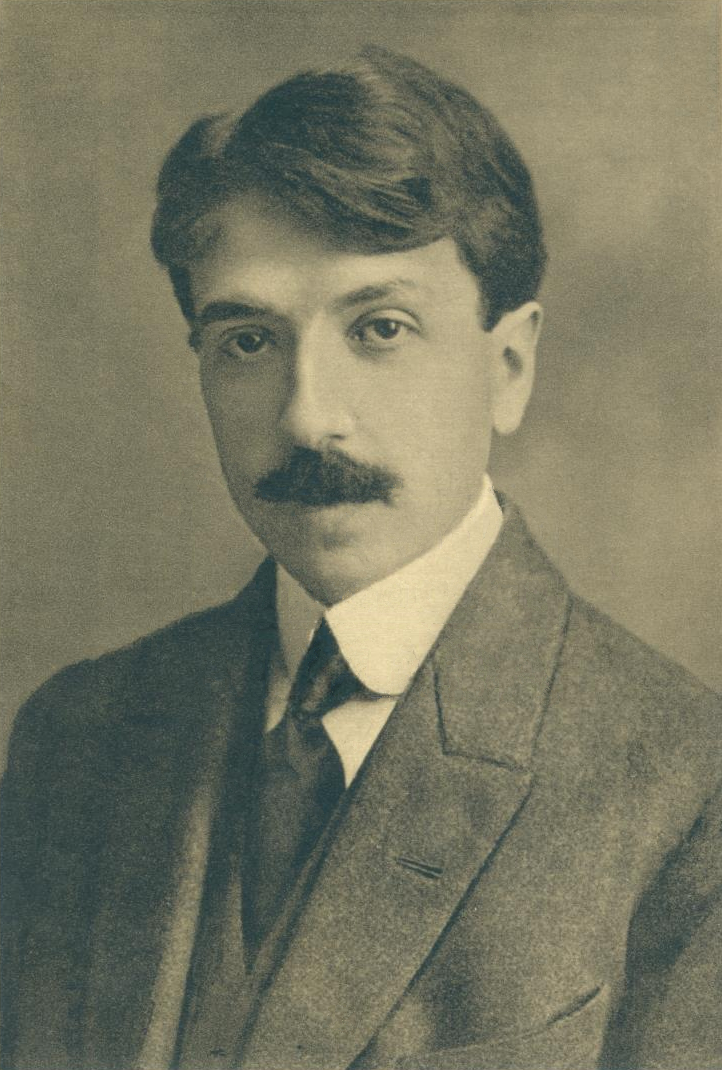
- Born: Raul Lino da Silva; 21 November 1879; Lisbon, Kingdom of Portugal
- Died: 13 July 1974 (aged 94)
- Parent: Anna Lloyd Jones

Raul Lino ComC GOSE ComCS (21 November 1879 – 13 July 1974) was a Portuguese architect, designer, architectural theorist, and writer. Lino's architectural theses and studies revolved around the theory of the Casa Portuguesa (Portuguese: Portuguese house), an idealized concept of Portuguese residential architecture, planning, and lifestyle.

The cities of Cascais and Sintra, along the Portuguese Riviera, boast the largest concentration of Lino's constructions out of anywhere, as part of the Summer architecture movement there. Lino played an active part in the cosmopolitanization of Cascais as a summer resort for the wealthy and notable and in the continuation of Sintra as a historicist's and romanticist's haven.

== Early life ==
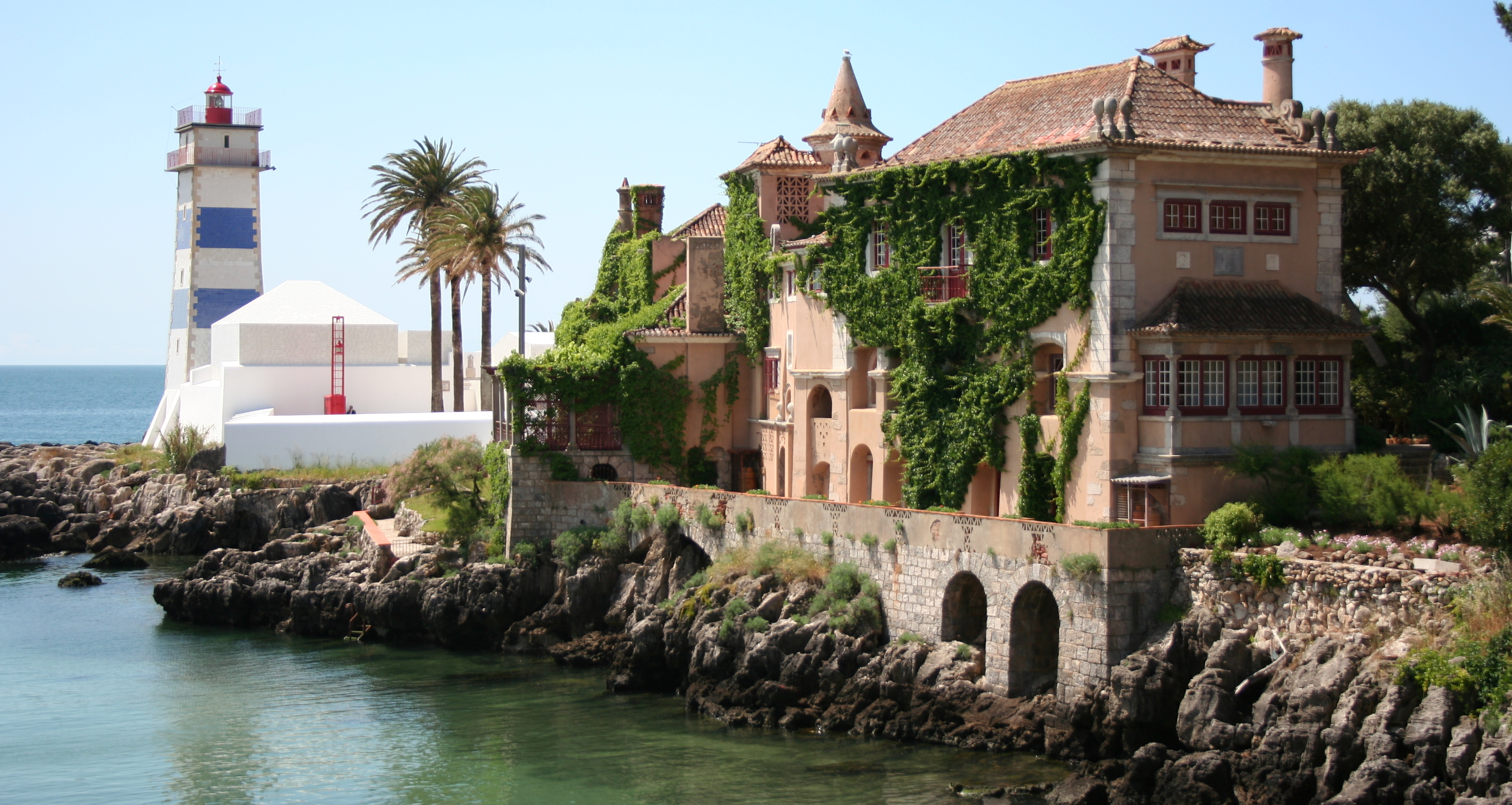
Casa de Santa Maria in Cascais, built in 1902.

Raul Lino da Silva was born in Lisbon, Portugal, on 21 November 1879, to a well-off construction materials merchant. His family's financial standing allowed Lino to leave Portugal, in 1890, to study in Windsor, England, for three years.

Following his studies in Britain, Lino moved to Germany, where he would study under and eventually work in the atelier of German revivalist architect, Albrecht Haupt, until 1897, when Lino returned to Portugal to finish his degree in architecture.

== Early career ==
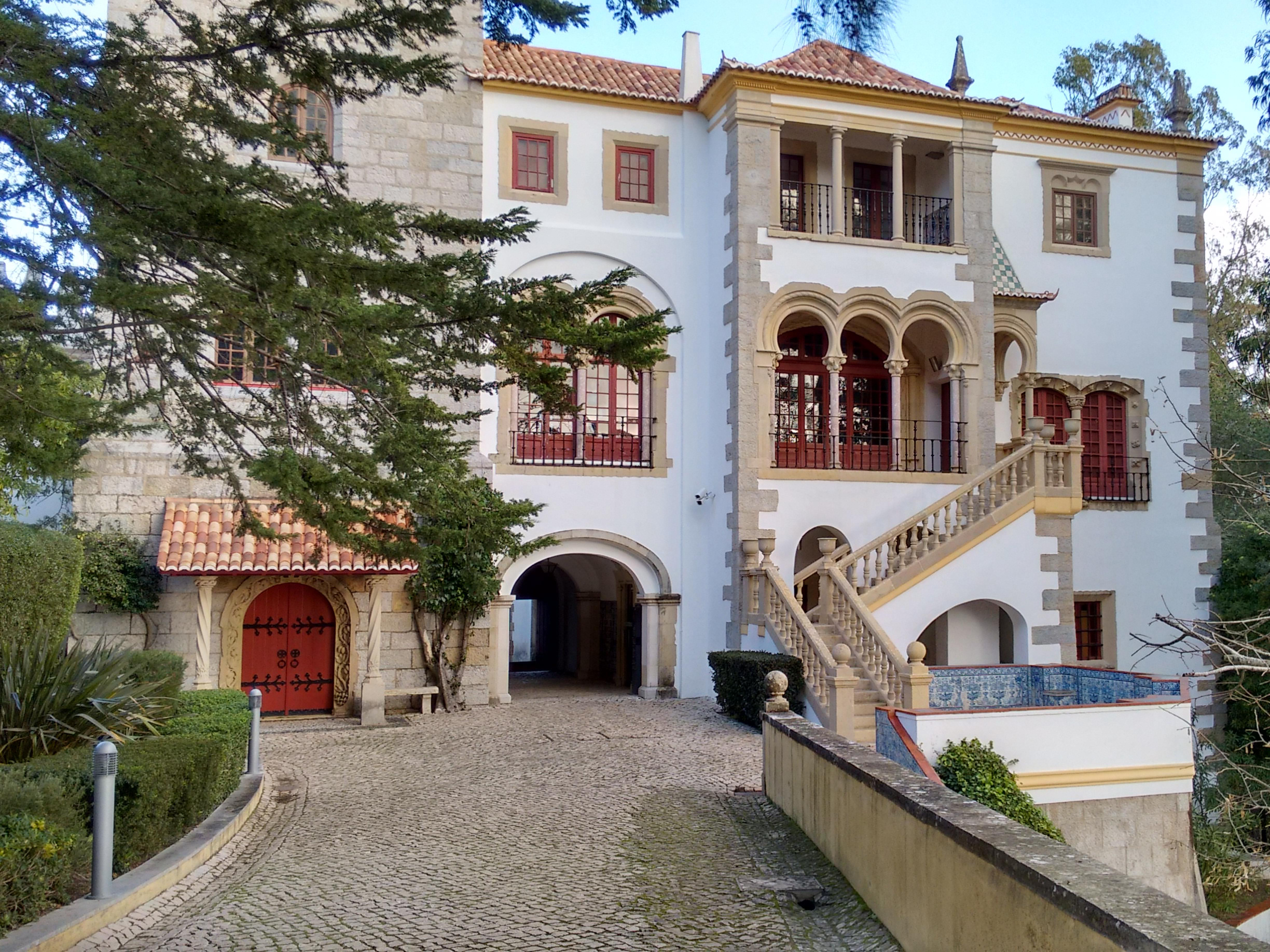
The Museum of Portuguese Music

After returning to Portugal and finishing his studies in architecture, Lino began to work in his father's construction materials business, in 1897. During this time, Lino began his travels across Portugal and his studies of the regionalisms in architecture and style, paying particular note initially to the Alentejo region.

Back to Portugal, he designed and built more than 700 projects. Many were in the Mediterranean Revival and Soft Portuguese styles.

He was a founding member of the National Academy of Fine Arts and served as its secretary in 1946.

Lino was a habitual guest writer for various Portuguese newspapers and journals, including the Diário de Notícias, the Diário Popular, and Atlantida.

== A Casa Portuguesa ==
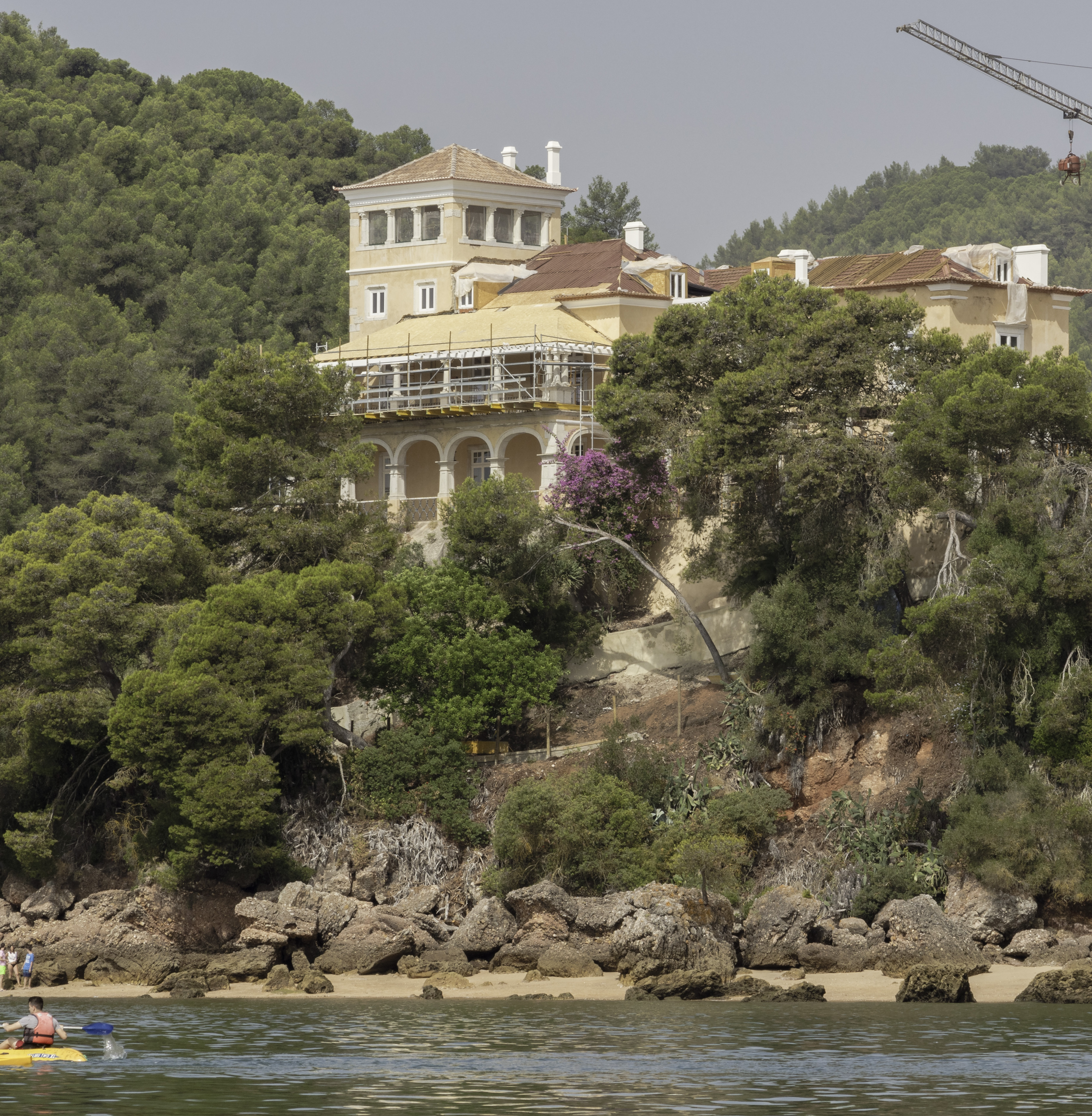
Palácio da Comenda in Arrábida

Lino also wrote many books and texts about the theory of the architecture of the Portuguese house, including:

- A Casa Portuguesa - The Portuguese House (1929)
- Casas Portuguesas - Portuguese Houses (1933)
- L'Evolution de l'Architecture Domestique au Portugal - The Evolution of Domestic Architecture in Portugal (1937)

== Selected works ==
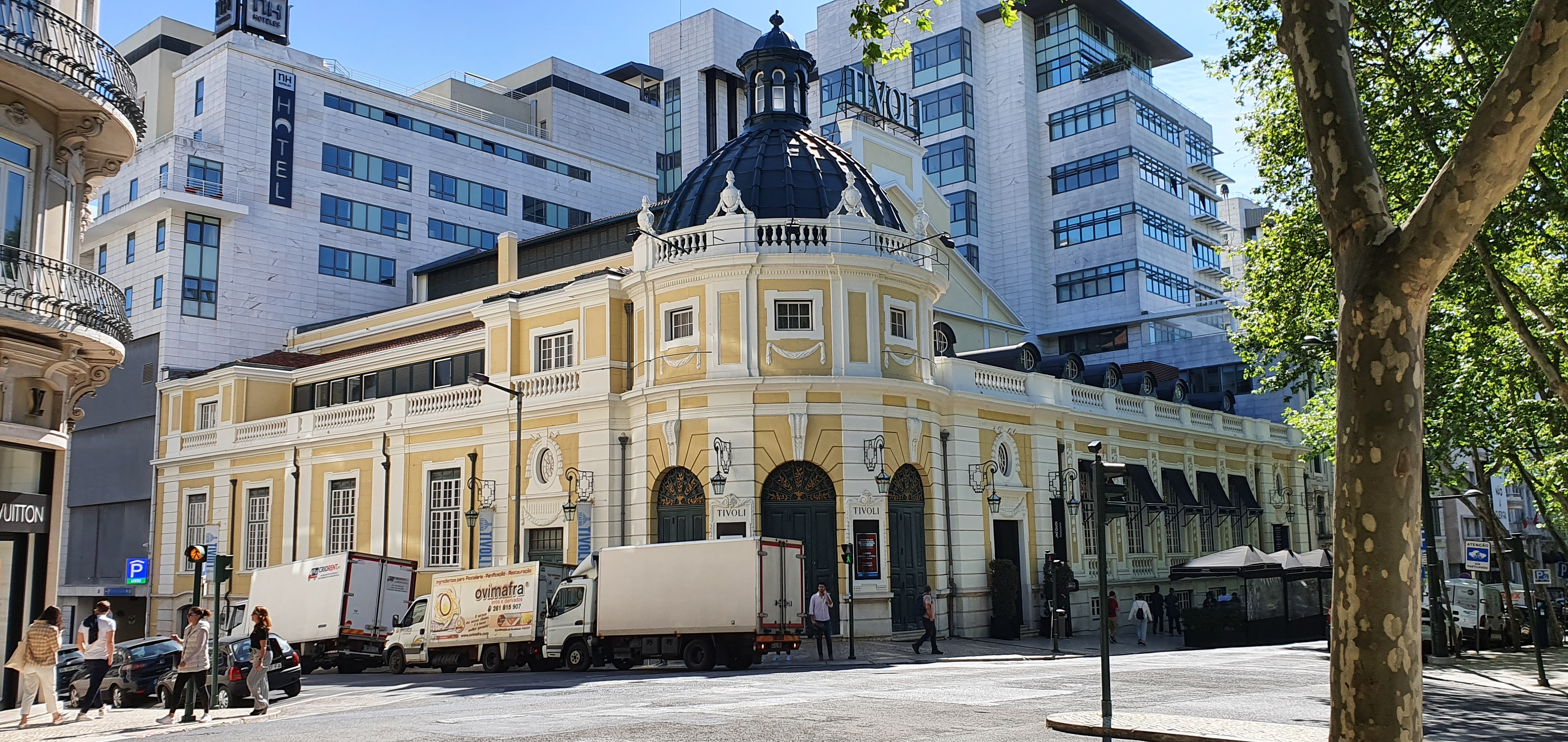
Teatro Tivoli in Lisbon, built in 1924.

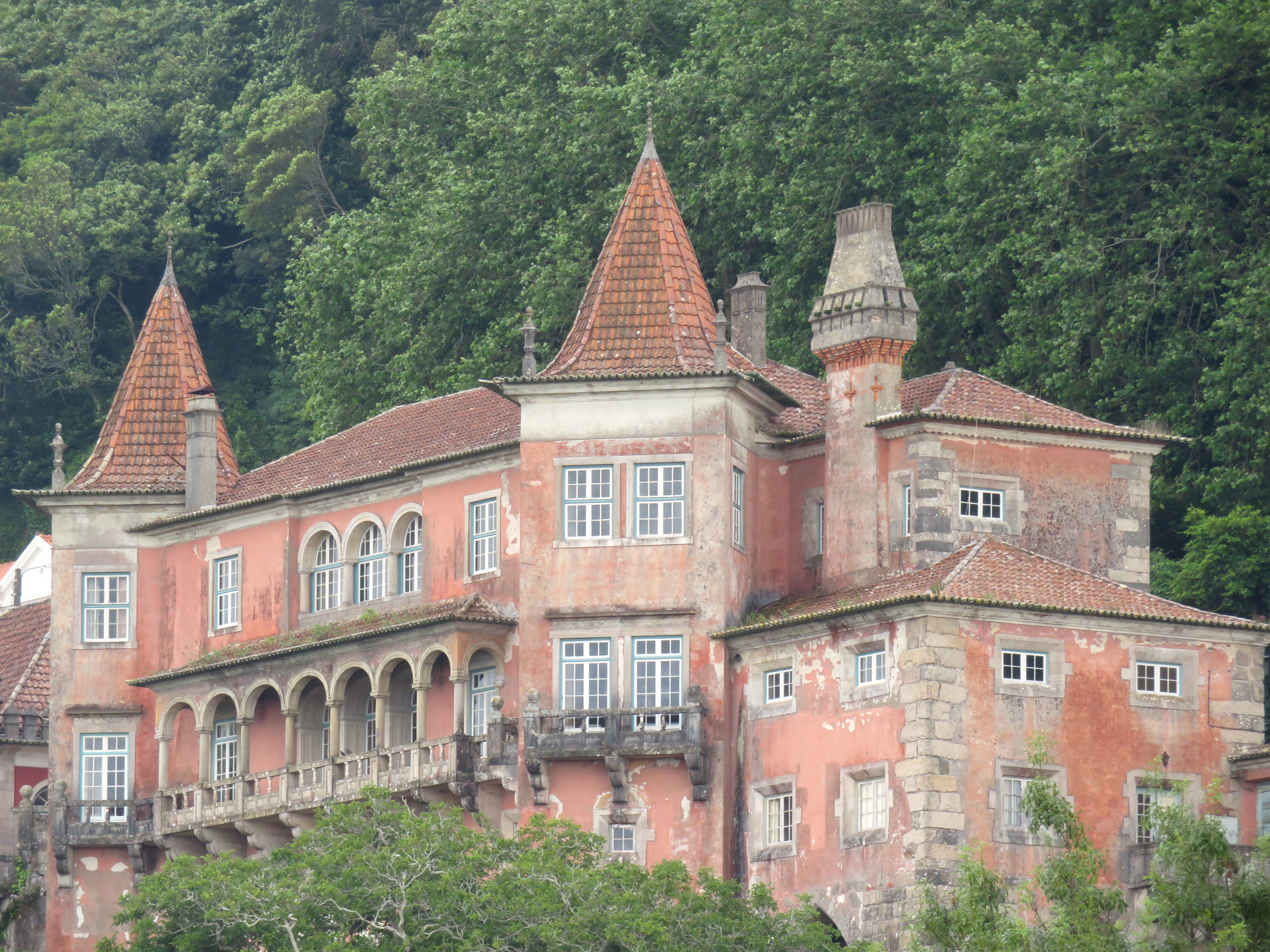
Casa dos Penedos in Sintra

Some of his most important projects were:

- House in Castilho street, 64 and 66 (Valmor Award 1930), Lisbon
- Casa dos Patudos, Alpiarça
- Teatro Tivoli, Lisbon
- João de Deus Museum and Kindergarten, Lisbon
- Gardénia Shop, Lisbon
- St. Patrick Tower, Estoril - now the Museum of Portuguese Music
- Montsalvat House, Estoril
- Silva Gomes House, Estoril
- Brazil Pavilion in the Portuguese World Exhibition, Lisbon
- House of Quinta da Comenda, Arrábida
- Casa de Santa Maria, Cascais
- Casa do Cipreste, Sintra
- Casa dos Penedos, Sintra
- Casa Branca, Azenhas do Mar
- Casa Branca, Oeiras

== See also ==
- Category: Mediterranean Revival architects
