= Maria Helena da Costa Dias =

- Born: 1917; Porto Inglês, Maio, Cape Verde
- Died: 1994 (aged 76–77); Lisbon, Portugal

Maria Helena Ferreira Chaves da Costa Dias (1917-1994) was a Portuguese writer

== Biography ==
She was born in Porto Inglês (now Cidade do Maio) on the island of Maio to architect Raul Pires Ferreira Chaves. She was also sister of the architect Jorge Ferreira Chaves and niece of Maria Alexandrina Pires Ferreira Chaves, Olímpio Ferreira Chaves and João Carlos Pires Ferreira Chaves. During her childhood years, she moved to the Portuguese Main.

She had her first year of the special architectural course at the Escola de Belas Artes de Lisboa from 1935 to 1936, later she joined the Faculty of Letters of the University of Lisbon where she wrote in a cultural journal Horizonte.

She married Augusto da Costa Dias, writer and investigator of Portuguese literature and culture in which she took part. She also adapted and translated several works, some of them of the greatest foreign writers, much of them from the Francophony world predominantly France.

She was the daughter of the Portuguese civil engineer and inventor Raul Pires Ferreira Chaves and Elvira da Conceição Ribeiro Ferreira Chaves and sister of the architect Jorge Ferreira ChavesShe was the niece of painter Maria Alexandrina Pires Ferreira Chaves, pilot Olímpio Ferreira Chaves and João Carlos Pires Ferreira Chaves, and cousin of engineer Maria Amélia Chaves.

== Works ==
- Animais esses desconhecidos (cover and illustrations by Tóssan). Lisbon, Portugália, 1965.
- A história da coelhinha branca ["Story of a Little White Rabbit"] (illustrations by João da Câmara Leme). Lisbon, Portugália, 1967.

=== Adaptations, translations and organizations ===
==== Adaptations ====
- Suzanne Henriette Chandet - Cozinha de urgência. Lisbon, Portugália, 1962.
- Victor Hugo - Les Misérables (Gavroche), Lisbon, Portugália, 1964.
- Mad H. Giraud - O desaparecimento de Sir Jerry. Lisbon, Portugália, 1966.
- Herman Melville - Benito Cereno. Lisbon, Portugália, 196-?. (Maria Helena da Costa Dias's version)
- Odette Joyeux - A idade feliz. (cover de João Câmara Leme). Lisbon: Portugália, imp. 1967.
- Camille Mirepoix - O leão Heitor. (illustrations by Tóssan). Lisbon: Portugália, 196-?.

==== Translations ====
- Georges Duby - As três ordens ou o imaginário do feudalismo. Lisbon, Estampa, 1982. (translation)
- José Ángel Garcia de Cortazar; Ruiz de Aguirre - História rural medieval. Lisbon, Estampa, 1983. (translation)
- Rafael Sabatini – Scaramouche. Lisbon, Vega, 1991. (translation)
- Fernand Poskin; (il. by Jacques Poirier) - As aventuras de Odete. Lisbon, Portugália, 1966.
- Edouard Peisson - A viagem de Edgar. Lisbon, Portugália, 196-?.
- Georges Sadoul - A vida de Charlot : romance, conto, novela, teatro, obras de cultura.... Lisbon, Portugália, 196-?.
- Albert Aycard - Os pequenos chineses. Lisbon, Portugália, 1966.
- Wilfred G. Burchett - Bombas sobre Hanói. Lisbon, Seara Nova, 1967.
- Victor de Sá - A crise do Liberalismo e as primeiras manifestações das ideias socialistas em Portugal: 1820-1852. 3ª ed. Lisbon, Livros Horizonte, 1978.
- Jacques-Yves Cousteau, Frédéric Dumas - World of Silence (O mundo do silêncio). Lisbon, Portugália, 196-?.
- Paul Vialar - Clara e os malfeitores. (cover by Infante do Carmo). Lisboa: Portugália, 19--?.
- Germaine Acremant - As solteironas de chapéu verde. Lisbon, Portugália, 1972.
- Germaine Acremant - As solteironas dos chapéus verdes. Lisbon, Portugália, 195-?.
- Marie Maraire - Aldeia S.O.S.. Lisbon, Portugália, 1965.
- Marie Maraire - Os 4 da Rua Sem Nome. (cover and illustrations by João Câmara Leme). Lisbon, Portugália, 196-?.
- Henriette Robitaillie - A minha casa perdida. (illustrations by João Câmara Leme). Lisbon, Portugália, 1967.
- Saint-Marcoux - O jardim submerso. (illustrations by João Câmara Leme). Lisbon, Portugália, 1967.
- Jacqueline Dumesnil - Os companheiros do veado de prata. (capa e ilustrações de João Câmara Leme). Lisboa: Portugália, 1967.
- Yvonne Meynier - Erika das colinas. (cover and illustrations by João Câmara Leme). Lisbon, Portugália, 1966.
- Mad H. Giraud - As férias de Sir Jerry. (capa e ilustrações de João Câmara Leme). Lisboa: Portugália, imp. 1965.
- André Massepain - O mistério do lago. Lisbon, Portugália, 1966.
- Elsa Triolet - Rosas a prestações. Lisbon, Portugália, 196-?.

==== Organised texts ====
- Poesias dispersas ("Dispersed Poems") (by) Almeida Garrett, preface and notes by Augusto da Costa Dias, Maria Helena da Costa Dias, Luís Augusto Costa Dias. Lisbon, Estampa, 1985.
- Almeida Garrett - Obra política : doutrinação da sociedade liberal : 1824-1827 [Almeida Garrett: Public Works: Teacher of Liberal Society: 1824-27]. Lisbon, Estampa, 1991. (organization, text, preface and notes) (with Luís Augusto Costa Dias (coord), João Carlos Lazáro Faria.)
- Almeida Garrett - Obra política : doutrinação da sociedade liberal : 1827 [Almeida Garrett: Public Works: Teacher of Liberal Society: 1827]. Lisbo, Estampa, 1992. (Organization, text, preface and notes) (with Luís Augusto Costa Dias (coord), João Carlos Lazáro Faria.)
- Narrativas e lendas (Narratives and Legends) by Almeida Garrett. Lisbon, Estampa, 1979. - Critical edition, texts, preface and notes by Augusto da Costa Dias. Collection of texts, organized by Maria Helena da Costa Dias.
- Romanceiro (by) Almeida Garrett. Lisbon, Estampa, 1983.
