= Jorge Ferreira Chaves =

Portuguese architect

- Born: 22 February 1920; Ponta do Sol, Santo Antão, Portuguese Cape Verde
- Died: 22 August 1981 (aged 61); Lisbon
- Occupation: architect
- Awards: José Luís Monteiro Prize (1946)

Jorge Ferreira Chaves (22 February 1920 – 22 August 1981) was a Portuguese architect.

Some authors may refer to him as "Jorge Chaves" or simply "Chaves".

He was one of the architects responsible, in the latter part of the 1940s, for the establishment of the Modern Movement in Portugal.

Professionally active between 1941 and 1981, he is considered one of the most perfectionist Portuguese architects. From 1946, in his office, he developed several dozens of projects for continental Portugal, the island of Madeira, Portuguese Guinea and Angola.

He also collaborated with some of Lisbon's most important architectural offices of the first half of the 20th century: those of Joaquim Ferreira, Miguel Jacobetty Rosa and Porfírio Pardal Monteiro.

== Biography ==
Jorge Ribeiro Ferreira Chaves was born on 22 February 1920, in Ponta do Sol, municipal seat of Ribeira Grande, on the island of Santo Antão in Portuguese Cape Verde.

He was the son of Portuguese civil engineer and inventor Raul Pires Ferreira Chaves and Elvira da Conceição Ribeiro Ferreira Chaves. His sister was Maria Helena da Costa Dias. He was the nephew of Maria Alexandrina Pires Ferreira Chaves, Olímpio Ferreira Chaves and João Carlos Pires Ferreira Chaves and cousin of engineer Maria Amélia Chaves.

From 1931 he lived in Lisbon.

=== Education ===
He studied architecture at the Escola de Belas Artes de Lisboa (English: Lisbon School of Fine Arts), having entered in 1935.

In 1941, his degree program was interrupted because of military service during World War II, and he was stationed with the Portuguese expeditionary forces on the island of São Miguel in the Azores. He remained on the island until 1944.

He rejoined the School of Fine Arts in 1944 to finish the architecture degree and was awarded the 1946 José Luis Monteiro Prize, which included a monetary stipend for students achieving academic excellence. The prize was significant, since it had not been awarded the previous years, and had accumulated. Simultaneously, in 1946-1947, he attended the Sculpture degree. In 1948, he graduated in architecture.

In his diploma application exam (Portuguese: Concurso para a Obtenção do Diploma de Arquitecto - CODA), in 1953, Jorge Chaves obtained a significant passing grade: 19 out of 20.

=== Career ===
His professional career started during the period of 1943-1956; a period which Nuno Portas has designated as the stage of "resistance" in Portuguese architecture and art. From 1944 to 1946, in the final years at university, he collaborated with architect Joaquim Ferreira. During this period, he also collaborated, occasionally, with architects Filipe Nobre de Figueiredo and Alberto Soeiro.

In 1946 he set up his first office together with his graduation classmate Luís Coelho Borges.

He was a member of ICAT - Iniciativas Culturais Arte e Técnica (English: Culture, Arts and Techniques Initiatives) and also of the Sociedade Nacional de Belas-Artes (English: National Society of Fine Arts). He participated in four sessions of the EGAP Exposições Gerais de Artes Plásticas (English: General Exhibitions of Visual Arts) by presenting architectural projects. In 1948, he participated in the 1º Congresso Nacional de Arquitectura (English: 1st National Congress of Architecture).

One of his "post - 48 Congress" projects was the Laboratorios Cannobio building, designed in 1948 and built in 1949. This was one of the first buildings to emerge in the Centre of Lisbon displaying an architectural language clearly engaged with the Modern Movement.
His project for the street corner of Rua Braancamp 7 with Rua Mouzinho da Silveira would also have been so, had it not been rejected for "aesthetic reasons”, by the conservative Municipality of Lisbon.

In parallel with project activity in his own office, he collaborated with the office of architect Miguel Jacobetty Rosa, between 1948 and 1952, and did an internship under the direction of architect Hernâni Gandra during 1951.

In 1952 he was invited to the office of the architect Porfírio Pardal Monteiro, with whom he worked in designing the Palácio da Rotunda and Sorel buildings, but especially the Hotel Ritz in Lisbon, "a remarkable work, for its aesthetic wisdom and excellence of material execution ". During architect Porfírio Pardal Monteiro illness and after his death in 1957, he ensured the continuity of the project of the hotel, by giving assistance to the construction and by heading the phase of execution in a special office built in the site, until its inauguration in 1959.

Although the design of Hotel Ritz was his core activity from 1952 to 1959, he kept his own office to which he was exclusively dedicated after 1959.

His most significant architectural production took place during a period characterized as "of a relative opening of the (dictatorial) regime to accept modern architecture". During the 1960s, he developed a specific trait, recognizable in such works as the “Pastelaria Mexicana” in Lisbon or the “Hotel Garbe” and the “Hotel Baleeira” in the Algarve and also in housing in Olivais Sul, Rua da Penha de França and Rua da Ilha do Príncipe in Lisbon. This latter case has been referred to as "perhaps the best urban intervention for housing in Lisbon in that decade".

The “Chamber of Commerce of Bissau” (Portuguese: Câmara de Comércio de Bissau), the headquarters of the Guinea’s Trade, Industry and Agriculture Association (Portuguese: Associação Comercial, Industrial e Agrícola da Guiné), is considered the most qualified architectural achievement in Bissau during the colonial period.

At the end of the 1950s he produced the “remarkable work of Caixa Geral de Depósitos bank in São Pedro do Sul, clearly influenced by the survey on vernacular architecture in Portugal (Portuguese: Inquérito à Arquitectura Popular em Portugal) that was carried out in the late 1950s.

"The Pastelaria Mexicana (a Lisbon cafe and snack-bar) is a highly remarkable example that led to the limits, in that period and in Portugal, the expressionist trends created inside the Modern Movement since the early 20th century" and that "developed a phenomenological sense of architectural vision that reached a climax, deemed even exceptional, in the history of architecture in Portugal."
"Broken line profiles and non-straight angles, key elements of an international lineage organicism rediscovered in the 1960s", are " brilliantly integrated in this perfect example of "total design"." The process of its classification as a monument of public interest has been ongoing in IGESPAR since 1996, after an intervention, in that same year, that changed significantly some parts of its architecture. It retains, however, part of the elements that motivated, in 1993, such a proposed classification.

Several of his major works, such as the “Pastelaria Mexicana” (cafe), the “Palissi Galvani” shop and the Hotel Florida in Lisbon, the Hotel Garbe, the Hotel da Baleeira and the Hotel Globo in the Algarve or the Chamber of Commerce of Bissau in Guinea-Bissau include conceptually integrated visual arts interventions, some created by himself.

The visual artists Jorge Vieira, José Escada, Martins Correia, Paulo Guilherme d'Eça Leal, Sena da Silva, Hein Semke, Querubim Lapa, Mario Costa, António Alfredo and João Câmara Leme were invited to intervene in his works.

In his career, he was accompanied in some of the listed projects, by the associated architects Luís Coelho Borges, Álvaro Valladas Petersen, Anselmo Fernandez Rodriguez, Eduardo Goulard Medeiros, Artur Pires Martins, Cândido Palma de Melo and also by Mario Xavier Antunes, Jorge Herédia, Frederico Sant'Ana and Vítor Sousa Figueiredo, who were internship members of his office and carried on collaborating with him.

His work also developed on the wide urban scale and he had an important role in the development of industrial design in Portugal. For the equipment of his buildings and interior designs, Jorge Ferreira Chaves always designed original furniture or chose mainly Portuguese designed and manufactured fixtures and objects.

From 1978 to 1981, he designed interventions in public buildings, as an Architect of the Ministry of Public Works (Portuguese: Direcção-Geral dos Edifícios e Monumentos Nacionais - DGEMN do Ministério das Obras Públicas).

He died in Lisbon on August 22, 1981.

== Buildings and projects ==
=== Built ===
Please see PROJECTOS E OBRAS of Chaves.

=== Unbuilt ===
Please see PROJECTOS E OBRAS of Chaves.

== See also ==
- Critical regionalism
- Expressionist architecture
- Organic architecture

== Bibliography ==
=== Books ===
- (in Portuguese) AGAREZ, Ricardo - “O Moderno revisitado - Habitação multifamiliar em Lisboa nos anos de 1950”; edição da C.M.L.; 2009. (p. 279)
- (in Portuguese) AGAREZ, Ricardo - "De regra, renda e desenho: arquitectura para a Misericórdia de Lisboa c. 1960" in AA.VV. - Património Arquitectónico da Santa Casa da Misericórdia de Lisboa, Vol. 2. Lisboa: Santa Casa da Misericórdia; 2010. Tomo I. (pp. 83–95 and 256-265)
- (in Portuguese) AGUIAR, Armando de - "Guiné Minha Terra", Lisboa: Agência Geral do Ultramar; 1964. (p. 80)
- (in Portuguese) ALMEIDA, Álvaro Duarte de; BELO, Duarte – “Portugal património: Lisboa”; 2008. (p. 155)
- (in Portuguese) CALDAS, João Vieira. "Porfírio Pardal Monteiro: Arquitecto"; Lisboa: Associação dos Arquitectos Portugueses; 1997. (pp. 91, 94 and 117)
- (in Portuguese) FERNANDES, José Manuel – “Que viva a Mexicana! (ou A batalha da Mexicana)" in “Lisboa em obras”; 1997; Livros horizonte. (pp. 205 and 208)
- (in Portuguese) FERNANDES, José Manuel - “Geração africana: arquitectura e cidades em Angola e Moçambique, 1925-1975”; 2002. (p. 33)
- (in Portuguese) FERNANDES, José Manuel - “A Mexicana” in “Arquitectura do Movimento Moderno: inventário Docomomo ibérico: 1925 / 1965”; Associação dos Arquitectos Portugueses: Fundação Mies van der Rohe: Docomomo Ibérico; 1997. (p. 287)
- (in Portuguese) LAMEIRO, Carlos - “Os meus cadernos 5 - Hotel Ritz Lisboa 1959 / 1999 - Na comemoração do seu Quadragésimo aniversário”; Centro editorial da FAUTL. (p. 11 and 15)
- (in Portuguese) NEVES, José Manuel das - “Cadeiras Portuguesas Contemporâneas”; Edições Asa; 2003. (pp. 62–63 and 162-163)
- (in Portuguese) MILHEIRO, Ana Vaz; DIAS, Eduardo Costa - "Arquitectura em Bissau e os Gabinetes de Urbanização colonial (1944–1974)";PDF; usjt.br/arq.urb/numero 02. (pp. 106–107)
- (in Portuguese) PORTAS, Nuno - “A evolução da Arquitectura Moderna” in ZEVI, Bruno “História da Arquitectura Moderna”; Editora Arcádia. (p. 739)
- (in Portuguese) “RITZ - quatro décadas de Lisboa”; Edição Hotel Ritz, SA. (pp. 40-42, 104 and 205)
- (in Portuguese) “Habitação social na cidade de Lisboa 1959-1966”; Gabinete Técnico de Habitação; edição da C.M.L.; Outubro 1967.

=== Catalogs and guides ===
- (in Portuguese) Catálogo da “X Exposição Geral de Artes Plásticas 1956 – Dez anos de Exposição Geral de Artes Plásticas 1945-1956”; -"Projecto para a nova sede da Associação Comercial, Industrial e Agrícola da Guiné, a construir em Bissau" - Arquitecto Jorge Ferreira Chaves e Álvaro Valladas Peterson - obra 124; Sociedade Nacional de Belas-Artes
- (in Portuguese) “Guia de Arquitectura Lisboa 94”; Edição A.A.P. (1994)

=== Other ===
- (in Portuguese) TOUSSAINT, Michel - "Texto de fundamentação para o pedido de Classificação da Pastelaria Mexicana"; 1993.
- (in Portuguese) TOUSSAINT, Michel - "Texto do abaixo-assinado em defesa da Pastelaria Mexicana entregue ao IPPAR"; 1994.
- (in Portuguese) MATOS, Madalena Cunha - "Coluna Polar - projecto de estudo e publicação da obra lisboeta de Jorge Ferreira Chaves". Candidatura nº PP07–279 ao programa de apoio a projectos pontuais para 2007, do Instituto das Artes.

=== Magazines ===
- (in Portuguese) “BINÁRIO” nº 13 (Out. 1959) (separata)
- (in Portuguese) “ARQUITECTURA” nº 23/24, Maio/Junho 1948 (p. 16)
- “ARQUITECTURA” nº 35, (p. 20)
- “ARQUITECTURA” nº 83, Setembro 1964 (p. 100 / 112)
- (in Portuguese) “NOTÍCIAS MAGAZINE”- 27/3/2005
- (in Portuguese) “EXPRESSO REVISTA” - 5/2/1994 - 11/5/2002
- (in Portuguese) “REVISTA ARQUITECTOS” nº 2, Maio /Junho 1989 (foto p. 74)
- (in Portuguese) “JORNAL ARQUITECTOS” nº 196, Maio/Junho 2000 (p. 13)
- “JORNAL ARQUITECTOS” nº 197, Setembro e Outubro 2000 (p. 63)
- “JORNAL ARQUITECTOS” nº 227, Abril/Junho 2007 (p. 23)
- “JORNAL ARQUITECTOS” nº 132, Fevereiro 1993 (p. 20 / 31)
- (in Portuguese) “K” nº32, Maio 1993 (p. 52)
- (in Portuguese) “INFORMAÇÃO ARQUITECTOS” nº17, Agosto 1994
- (in Portuguese) “BOLETIM DO G.T.H. LISBOA” nº 30/33 (Vol. 5) 1976 / 1977 (p. 212 / 215 and 230 / 237)
- “BOLETIM DO G.T.H. LISBOA” nº 50/51 (Vol. 7) 1986 (p. 232)
- (in Portuguese) “PANORAMA”, Volume 3, Edições 1-4; 1956
- (in Portuguese) “BROTÉRIA”, Volume 61; 1955 (p. 91)
- (in Portuguese) “CAMÕES: revista de letras e culturas lusófonas”, Edições 15-16 - Instituto Camões; 2003 (p. 205)

=== Television ===
- “O Hotel Ritz”; Documentary by Manuel Graça Dias; RTP 2

=== Buildings designed by Jorge Ferreira Chaves used for “Decor” in Portuguese motion pictures ===
- Edifício de habitação na Rua da Ilha do Príncipe nº 7 in Lisbon, appears in:

“Filha da Mãe” a film by João Canijo; Atalanta filmes; color; 1987
“Fragmentos de um Filme Esmola, a Sagrada Família” a film by João César Monteiro; Madragoa filmes; b/w; 1972
“Duas Histórias de Prisão” a film by Ginette Lavigne; Artline, Citizen TV and LX Fimes; color; 2001
“Nós” a film by Cláudia Tomaz; Madragoa filmes; color; 2002

- Pastelaria Mexicana in Lisbon, appears in:

“Corte de Cabelo” a film by Joaquim Sapinho; Rosa filmes; color; 1994

- Hotel Florida in Lisbon, appears in:

“Tony” a film by Bruno Lourenço; O som e a fúria; color; 2010

- Galerias do Hotel Florida in Lisbon, appears in:

“Rapazes de Táxis” a film by Constantino Esteves; Cinedex; b/w; 1965
“Senhor X” a film by Gonçalo Galvão Teles; Fado Filme; color; 2010
