= Teatro Tivoli =

Theatre in Lisbon, Portugal

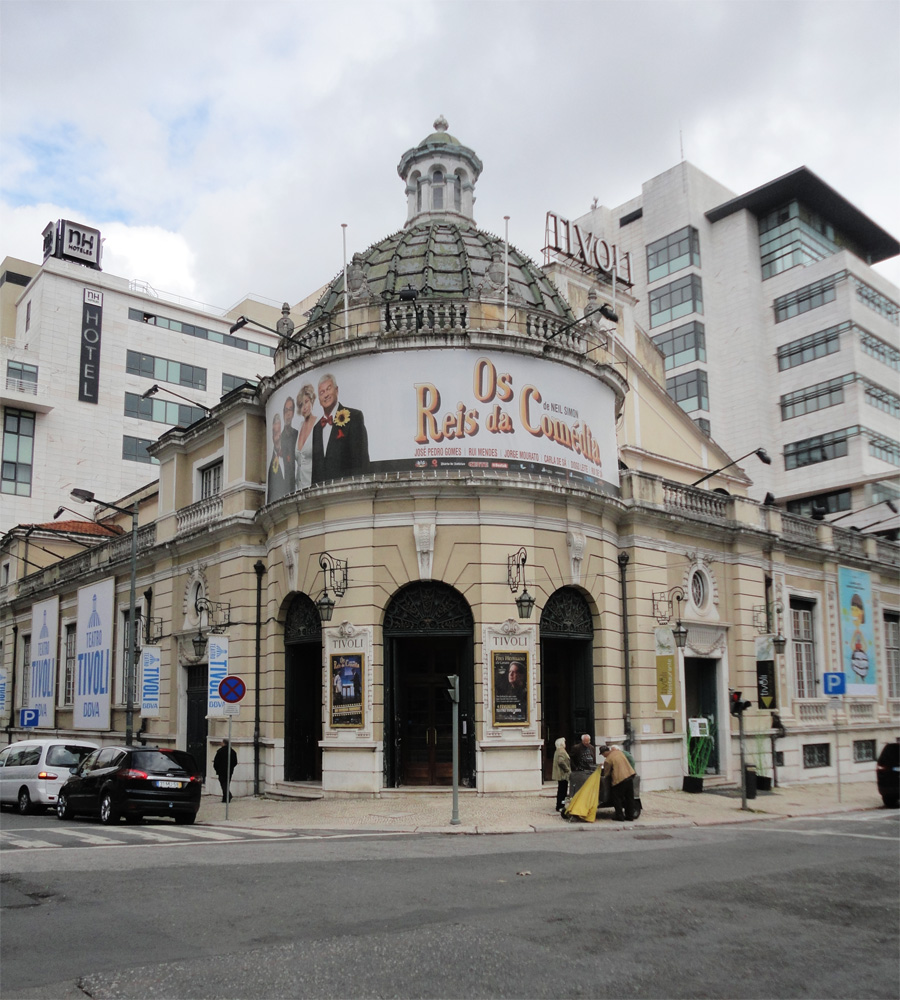
- Interactive map of Teatro Tivoli
- Address: Avenida. da Liberdade 182; Lisbon; Portugal
- Coordinates: 38°43′14″N 09°08′42″W
- Owner: UAU
- Capacity: 1149

Construction
- Opened: 30 November 1924
- Architect: Raul Lino

The Teatro Tivoli is a theatre located on the Avenida da Liberdade, in the Portuguese capital of Lisbon. It is also used as a cinema. The theatre, which celebrated its 100th anniversary in 2024, is presently known as the Teatro Tivoli BBVA as a result of sponsorship by the Banco Bilbao Vizcaya Argentaria. The Tivoli has 1149 seats and has been classified as a Monument of Public Interest since 2015.

== History ==
The theatre was funded by Frederico de Lima Mayer, son of Adolfo Lima Mayer who gave his name to the Parque Mayer entertainment complex on the other side of the Avenida da Liberdade. From the start it was intended to be able to offer both theatrical performances and films. The architect was Raul Lino, a well-known architect in the Lisbon area. It was opened after four years of construction and, at the time, was considered to be the best theatre in Portugal.

From its first day it aimed to establish itself as a cinema/theatre that showed only the best films and produced only the best plays, separating itself from those theatres in Parque Mayer, that tended to produce comedy revues. The film shown at the inauguration on 30 November 1924 was Henry Roussel's film Imperial Violets. Starting during the silent film era, it was converted to show sound films in 1930, with the first one being shown in November of that year.

In 1925, at the initiative of António Ferro, a resident theatre group was created, known as Teatro Novo. This brought to the Portuguese public plays such as Each In His Own Way by Luigi Pirandello and Knock by Jules Romains. Several pieces were considered daring or avant-garde for that time in Portugal, although Ferro went on to be in charge of propaganda for the conservative Estado Novo dictatorship.

After Frederico Lima Mayer's death, his son, Augusto Lima Mayer, installed a stage and dressing rooms. The theatre then hosted famous companies such as the Comédie Française, the Théâtre du Vieux-Colombier and the Royal Shakespeare Company performing The Merchant of Venice and A Midsummer Night's Dream, with Barbara Jefford and Ralph Richardson. It also attracted numerous musicians, such as the composers and conductors Igor Stravinsky, Thomas Beecham, and Frederico de Freitas, pianists such as Sequeira Costa, Maria João Pires, Arthur Rubinstein and José Viana da Mota, the violinist Yehudi Menuhin, and the cellist Guilhermina Suggia. Ballets were also often presented there. From the 1970s the theatre became more international in its outlook, putting on plays written by playwrights such as Terence Frisby, Peter Luke, Francis Veber, Jean Anouilh, and Neil Simon.

In 1973, the Tivoli ceased to belong to the Lima Mayer family, having been acquired by João Ildefonso Bordallo and in 1989 it was acquired by a Spanish businessman, Emiliano Revilla, who, shortly afterwards, sold the majority of his shares to a Spanish company. From the 1980s there was a possibility that the theatre would be demolished but this was no longer possible after it was declared a Property of Public Interest in 1997. After a period of closure, the theatre reopened in 1999, having undergone renovation work. Since then, it has undergone several further changes in ownership.

In 2012 it was renamed Teatro Tivoli BBVA following a sponsorship agreement with the Spanish bank Banco Bilbao Vizcaya Argentaria. In 2015, the Tivoli was classified as a Monument of Public Interest, a crucial step towards maintaining its character.

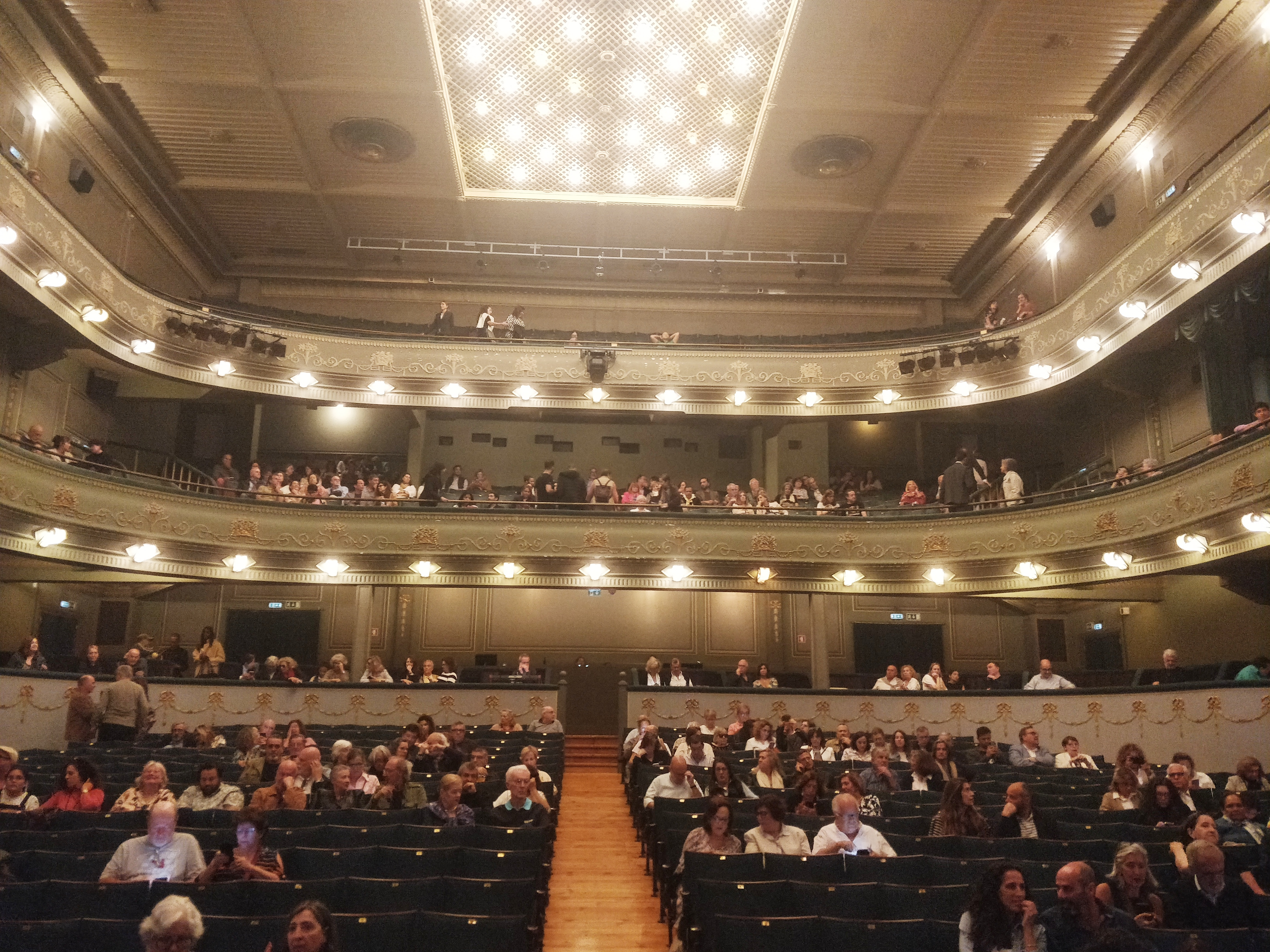
Interior of the theatre

== Architecture ==
Teatro Tivoli is in a neoclassical style, with accentuated shapes and a domed roof covered in black tiles, making it a unique example of its kind in Lisbon. It is said to bear a resemblance to theatre architecture found in Paris. Its size is not evident from the exterior and the design is sensitive to the surrounding area.

With regard to the interior, in addition to the stage there is an orchestra pit. For the audience there are stalls, first and second balconies and boxes, with a total capacity of 1149. The decoration of the seating areas shows a class division: the stalls and first balcony have decorations in gold, whereas the second balcony walls are all painted white. Lino originally proposed a decoration that mainly consisted of some polychrome ceramic bouquets in great relief, in a modern style and very bright colours but he failed to convince Lima Mayer.

== See also ==
- List of theatres and auditoriums in Lisbon
