= Museum of Portuguese Music =

Historic house now used as Portugal's only musical instrument museum

Museum of Portuguese Music, Estoril
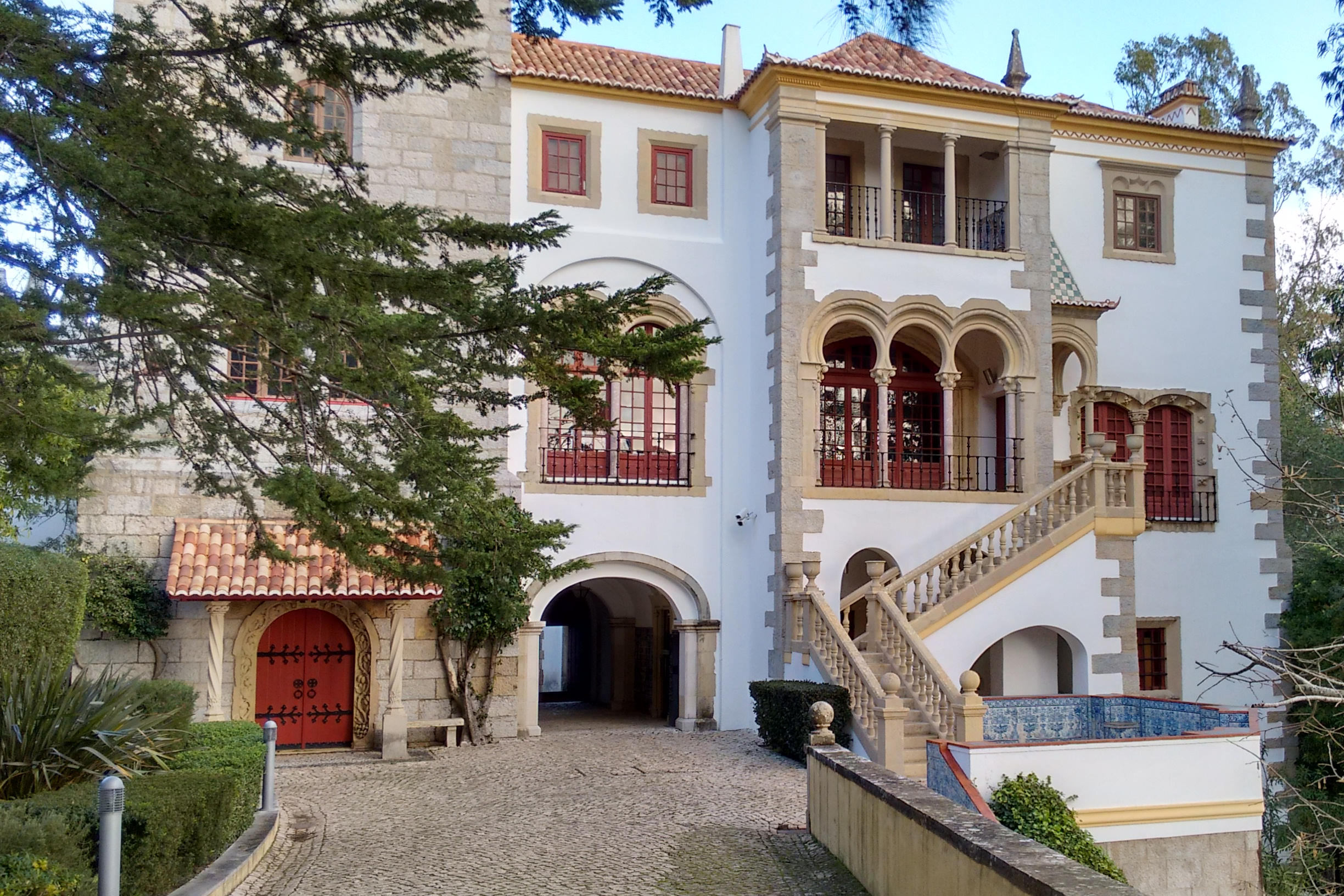

- Location within Portugal
- Established: 1987; 39 years ago
- Location: Avenida de Sabóia 1146, Monte Estoril, 2765-580, Portugal
- Coordinates: 38.7097°N 9.4053°W

The Museum of Portuguese Music (Portuguese: Museu da Música Portuguesa) is a small museum housed in the Casa Verdades de Faria in Estoril, municipality of Cascais, Portugal, on the Portuguese Riviera. It contains a collection of Portuguese musical instruments and other items, as well as a music documentation centre, and is also used for recitals.

== The building ==
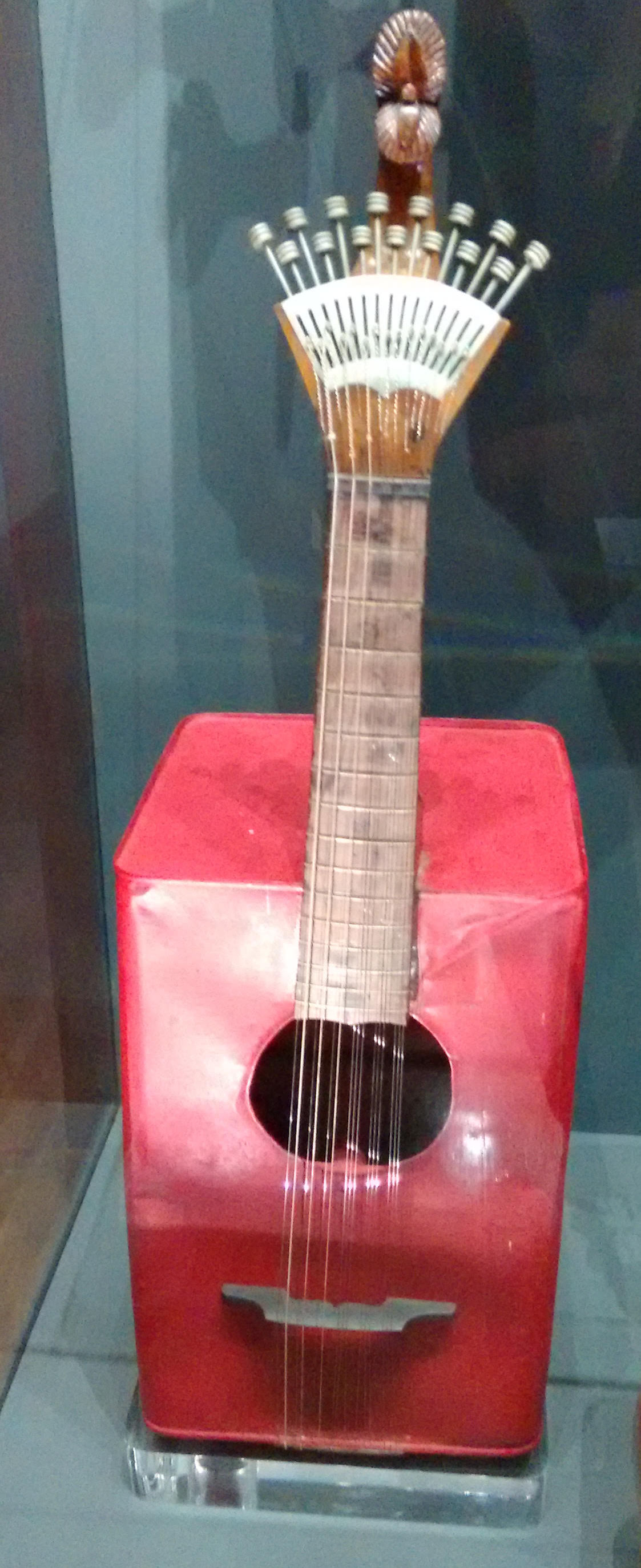
A Portuguese guitar at the museum

The attractive building that houses the museum was commissioned in 1918 by Jorge O'Neil, a Portuguese / Irish aristocrat and businessman. O’Neill was also responsible for the construction of the Tower of San Sebastián and the Casa de Santa Maria, both in neighbouring Cascais. Originally known as the Torre de S. Patrício (Saint Patrick Tower), the building was designed by the Portuguese architect Raul Lino. It is considered an excellent example of a Revivalist approach that includes Neo-romanticism, and one of the main examples of the so-called summer architecture, used to describe some buildings constructed in the Estoril and Cascais area from the mid-19th century. Its interior is decorated with painted stucco, stained glass and 18th century tiles.

Around 1942, Enrique Mantero Belard acquired the building, making a number of changes in the house and in the garden. His wife, Gertrudes Verdades de Faria, promoted social gatherings and cultural events, and was a patron of the arts. In his will of 1974, in addition to leaving significant sums to the charity Santa Casa da Misericórdia de Lisboa, he left the house to the Municipality of Cascais, to be named after his wife and used as a museum and public garden. The museum opened in 1987 and it was extensively remodelled in 2005. However, it has been criticised for insufficiently recognising the archaeological and artistic heritage of the building in presenting the museum's contents.

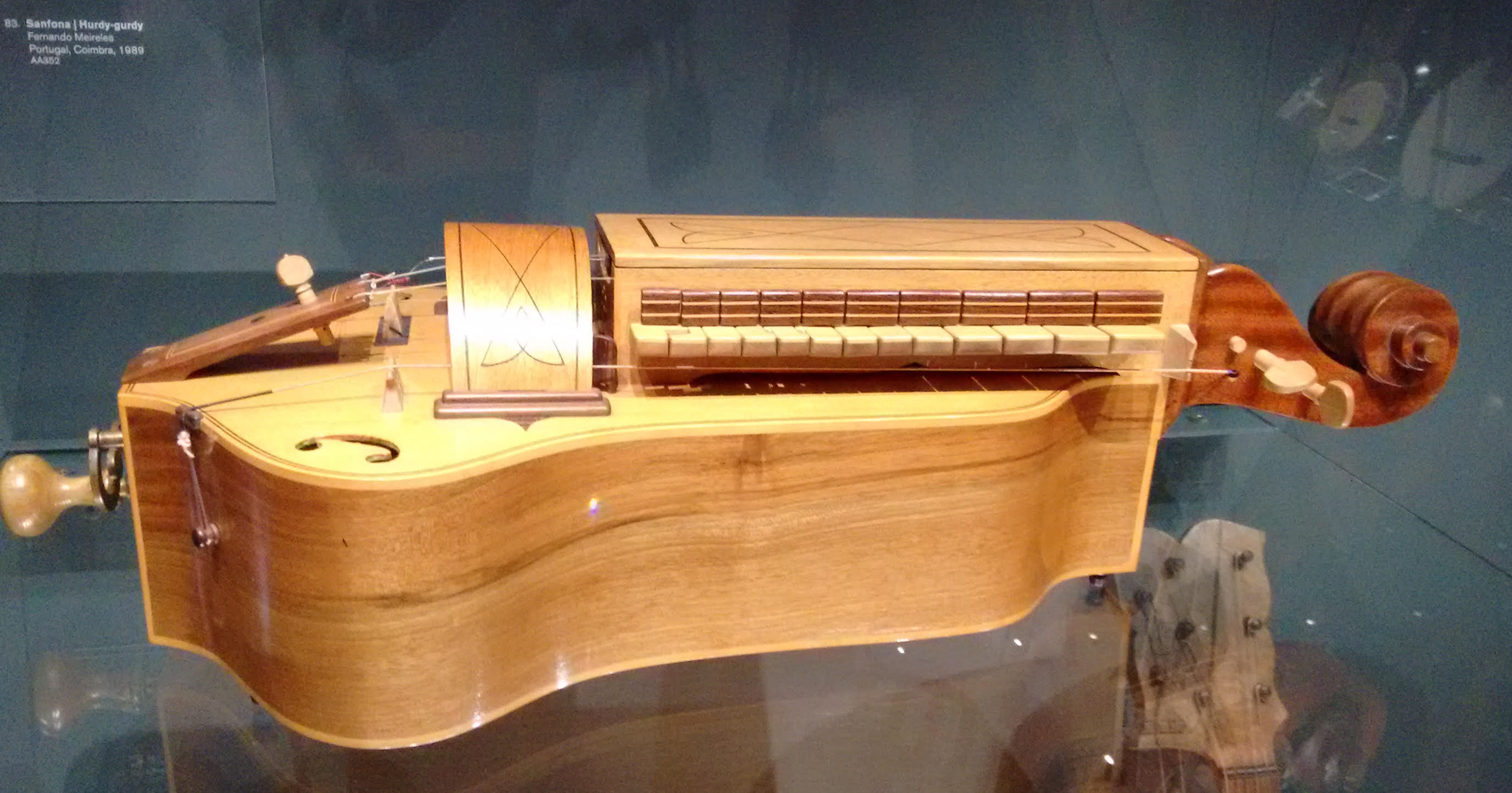
A hurdy-gurdy

== The museum ==
A large part of the museum's collection of popular string, wind and percussion musical instruments used in Portugal was put together by the Corsican musician and ethnologist Michel Giacometti, who spent much of his life studying Portuguese folk music. The collection of 381 instruments was acquired by the Cascais Municipality in 1981, together with some ethnographic items. Giacometti was on the committee to set up the museum, with the collaboration of the Portuguese Institute of Cultural Heritage and the Portuguese Museum of Ethnology in Lisbon. Giacometti's library was also acquired, allowing the creation of the documentation centre of the museum. In 1994, the composer Fernando Lopes Graça, who had previously worked closely with Giacometti on his research, left many items to the Municipality of Cascais in his will and these were incorporated in the museum in 1995. At this time the museum took on its present name. More recently, it has also incorporated a collection acquired from the conductor Álvaro Cassuto.

Instruments to be seen are guitars, mandolins, accordions, flutes, bagpipes, concertinas, drums, tambourines, and idiophones, such as castanets, ferrinhos, and lamellophones. The documentary collection includes the personal libraries of Giacometti and Lopes-Graça, together with the field and bibliographical collections of Giacometti. Additionally it contains Lopes-Graça's musical work, considerable correspondence, and photographs, together with the library of Portuguese music by Cassuto.

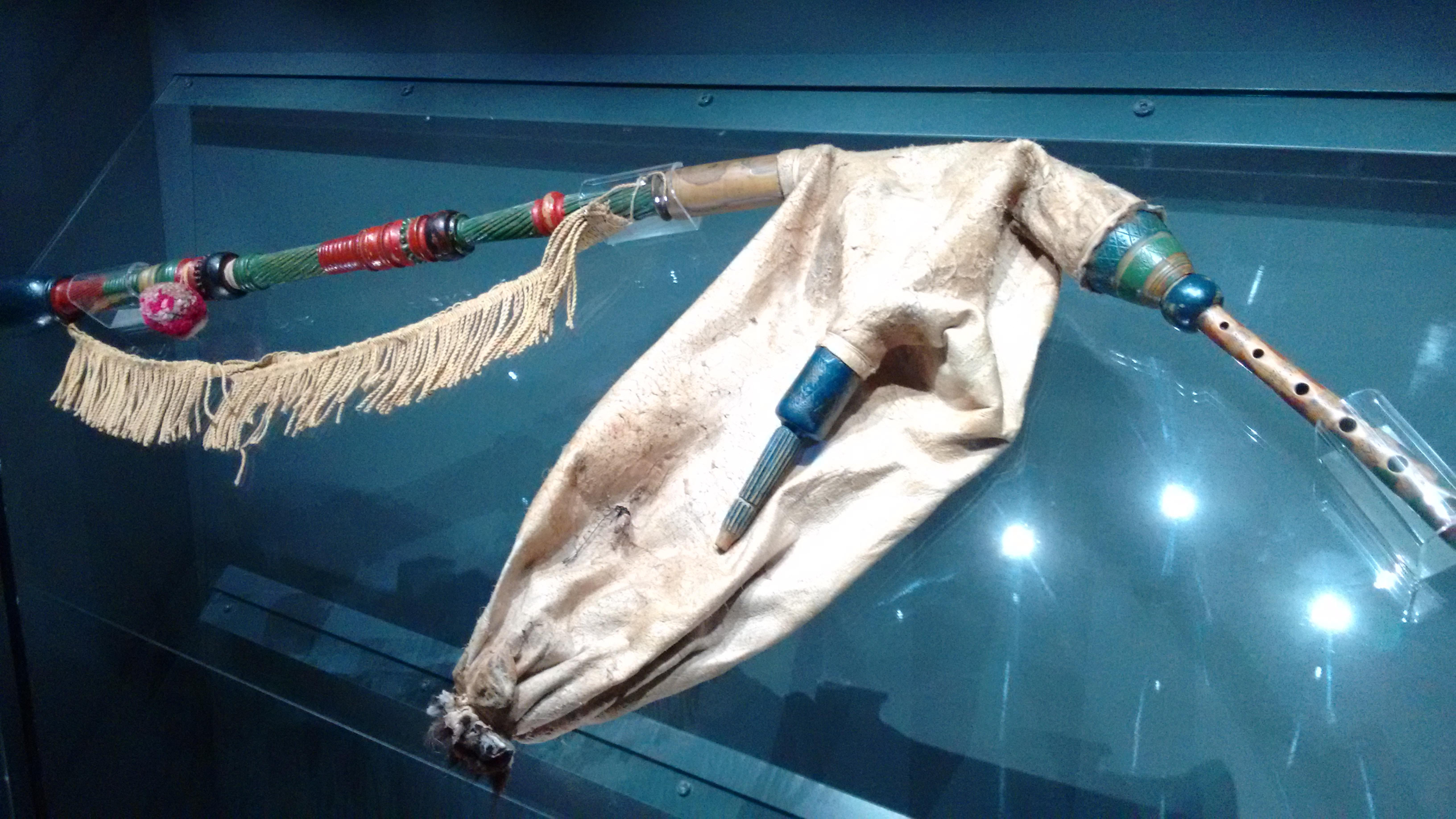
Portuguese bagpipes

== See also ==
- List of music museums
