= Michel Giacometti =

Michel Giacometti (8 January 1929, Ajaccio, France – 24 November 1990, Faro, Portugal) was a French ethnomusicologist from Corsica who made important field recordings in Portugal.

== Biography ==
Born in Ajaccio, Corsica on 8 January 1929, Giacometti moved to Portugal in 1959. In the following 30 years, he dedicated his life to travelling across Portugal, studying and recording popular oral traditions which were being lost or forgotten. He died in Faro, Portugal on 24 November 1990.

Giacometti also built up a large collection of Portuguese musical instruments, much of which can now be found at the Museum of Portuguese Music in Estoril.
