= Estoril =

- Civil Parish
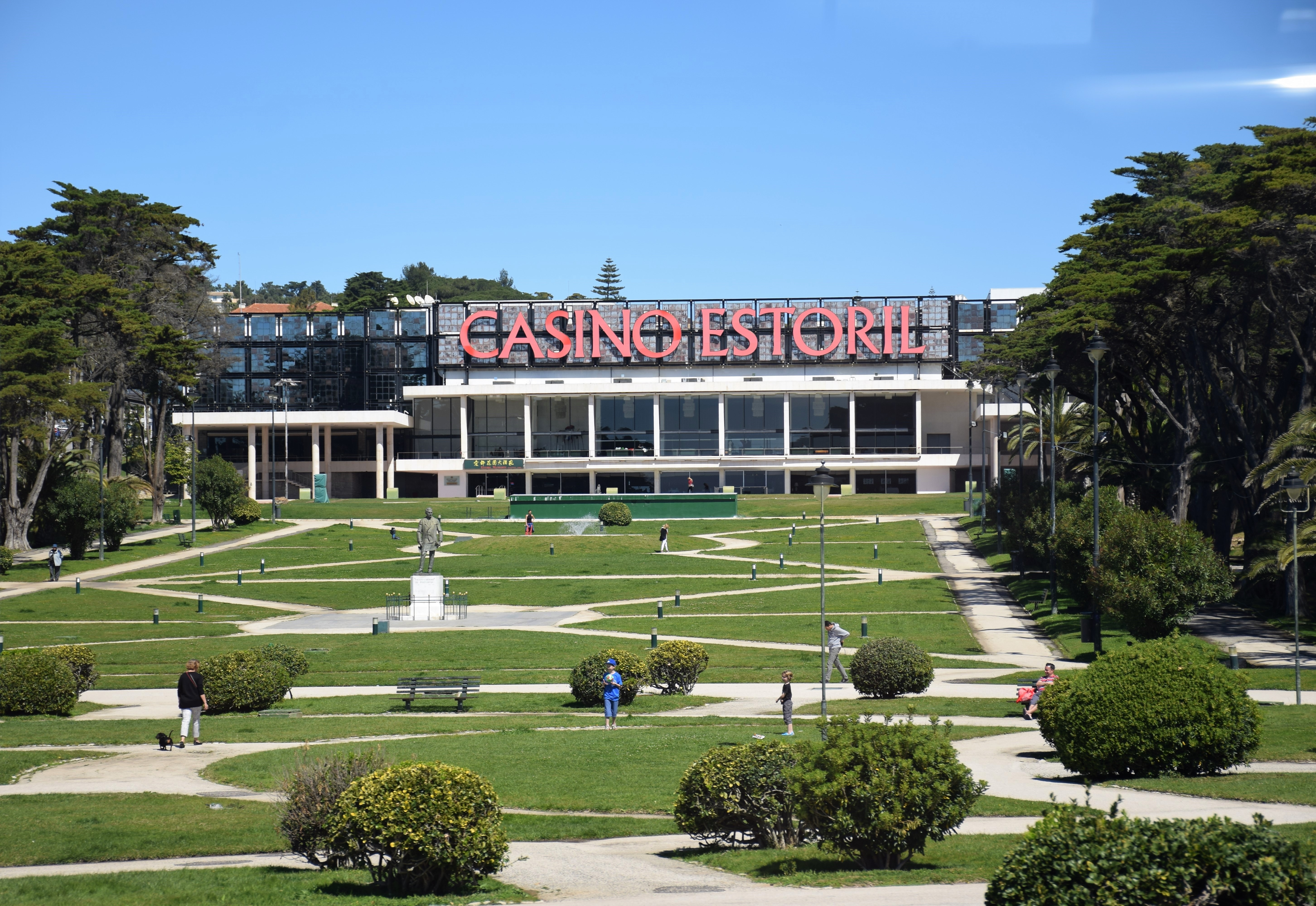
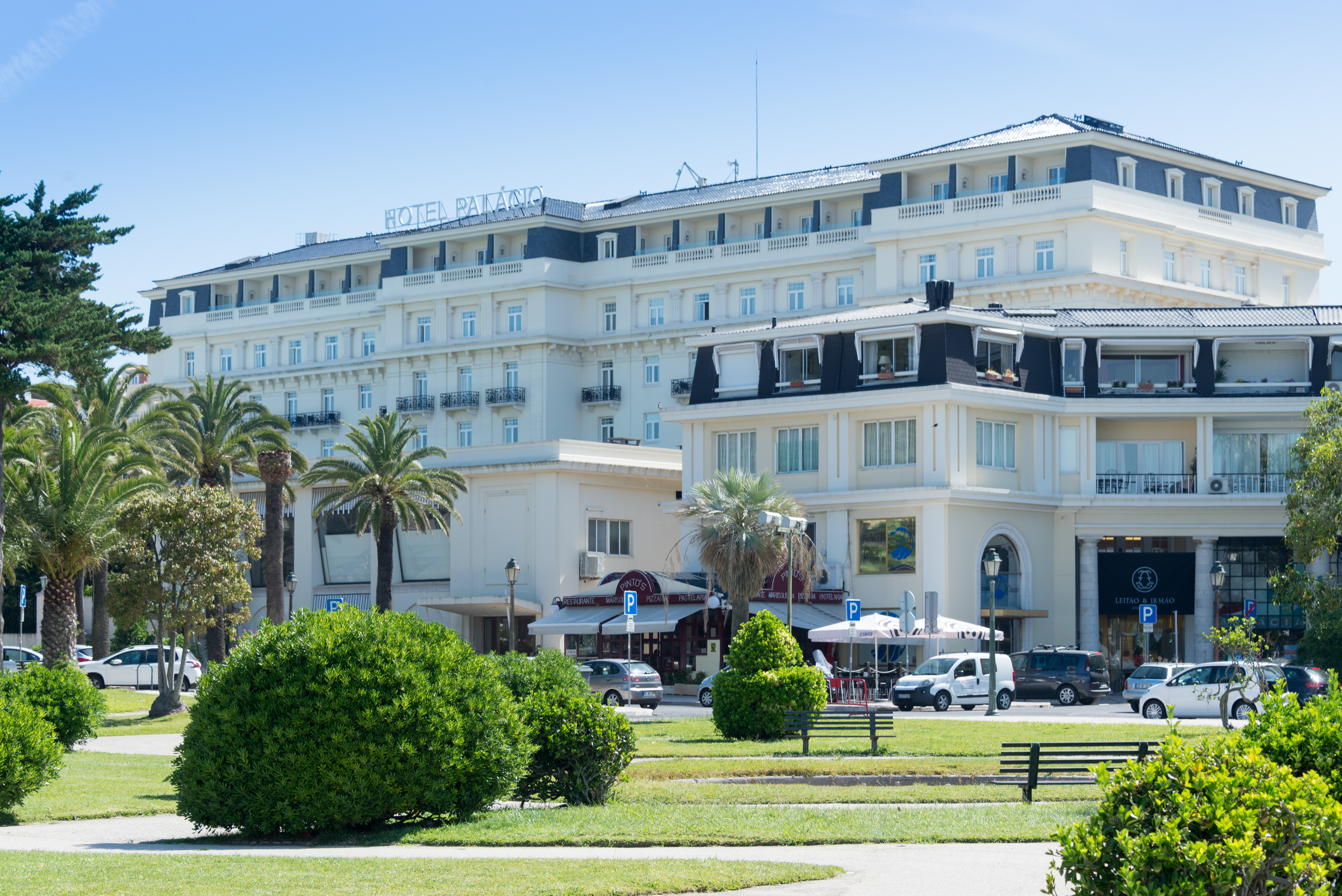
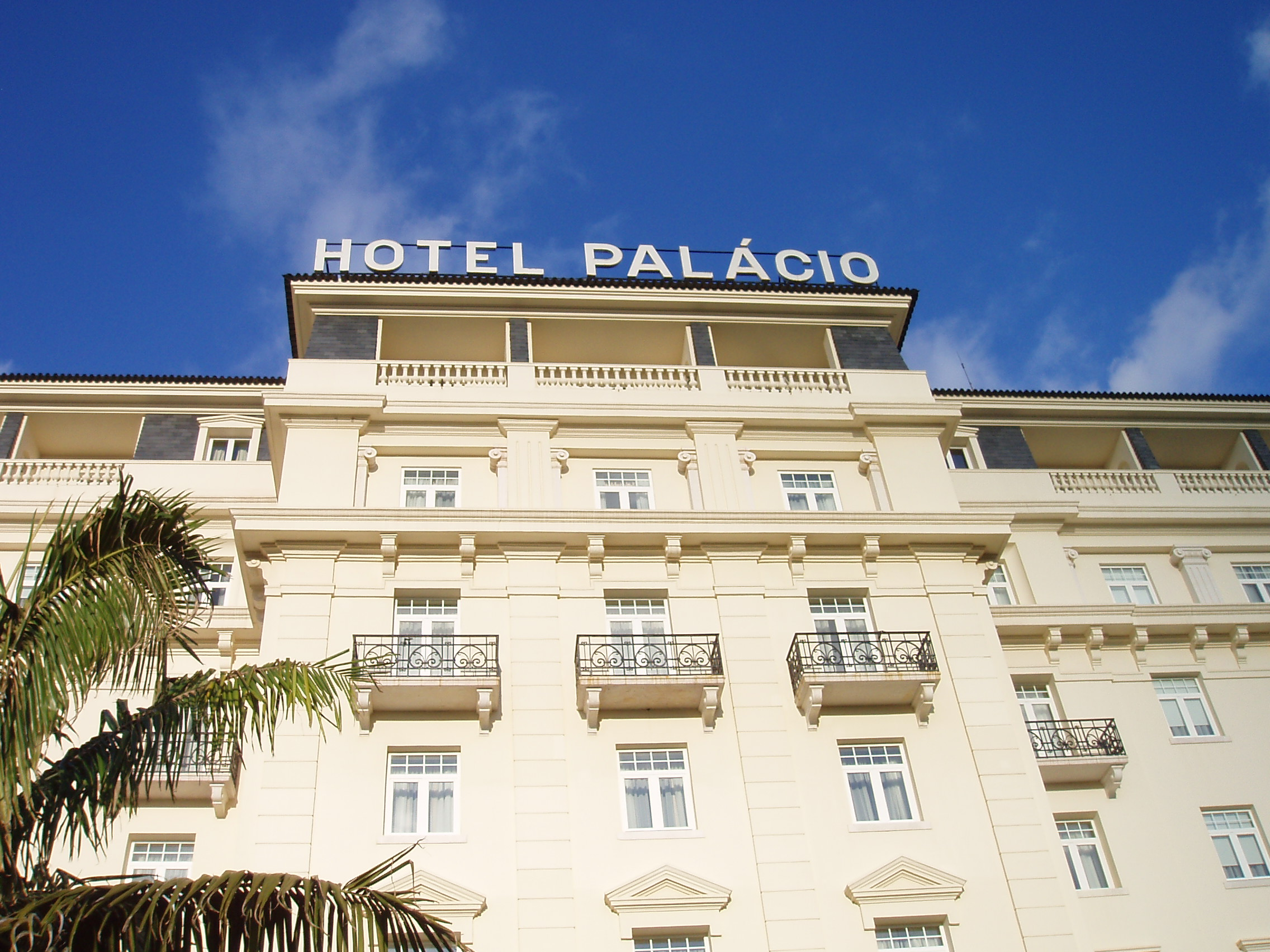
- Clockwise: Casino Estoril; Praia da Poça; Hotel Palácio Estoril; Tamariz Beach; Casino Gardens.

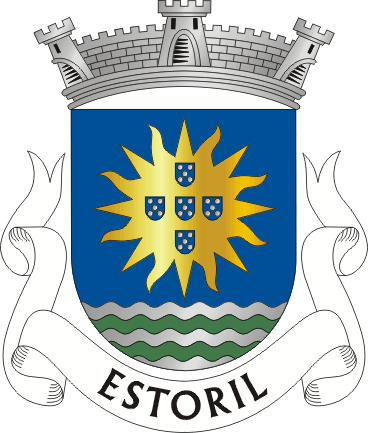
- Coat of arms

- Location within Portugal
- Coordinates: 38°42′15″N 9°23′54″W
- Country: Portugal
- Region: Lisbon
- Subregion: Lisbon metropolitan area
- District: Lisbon
- Municipality: Cascais
- Localities: Alapraia, Alto dos Gaios, Areias, Atibá, Galiza, Bairro da Martinha, Bairro Sto António, Bairro Fausto Figueiredo, Estoril, Livramento, Monte Estoril, Monte Leite, São João do Estoril, São Pedro do Estoril
- Time zone: UTC0 (WET)
  - Summer (DST): UTC+1 (WEST)
- Postal Zone: 2765-281
- Area code: (+351) 214 XX XX XX
- Demonym: Santo António
- Geographic detail from CAOP (2010) produced by Instituto Geográfico Português (IGP)

Estoril (Portuguese pronunciation: [ɨʃtuˈɾil]) is a town in the civil parish of Cascais e Estoril of the Portuguese Municipality of Cascais, on the Portuguese Riviera. It is a popular tourist destination known for its hotels, beaches, and the Casino Estoril, and has historically been home to numerous royal families and celebrities. The town has also hosted high-profile events, including the Estoril Open and the Lisbon & Estoril Film Festival.

Estoril is considered one of the most expensive places to live in Portugal and the Iberian Peninsula. It is home to a sizable foreign community and known for its luxury restaurants, hotels, and entertainment. Cascais is consistently ranked for its high quality of living, making it one of the most livable places in Portugal.

== Etymology ==
Estoril may derive from the Old Portuguese estorga ('heather'), a common plant in the area, with the final meaning 'place where heather grows or is abundant,' or from the Old Portuguese astor ('Northern goshawk'), meaning a place where such birds live.

== History ==
The territory of Estoril has been inhabited for centuries, owing to its climatic conditions and favourable environment. Throughout the civil parish, there are scattered remains of these early communities. Phoenicians, Romans and Arabs selected this area for its strategic place in Western Europe. There are remains of Roman villas in the parish that push back the history of the region to the first millennium, when the settlements of the coast were dependent on the fishing ports. From these settlements, Estoril inherited a rich cultural heritage, including architecture, toponymy, habits and customs.

In 1147, during the Reconquista, the region was brought under Christian control.

Owing to its strategic location, the region was intimately linked to the Portuguese Age of Discovery and all the dynamic social and cultural upheavals that it originated.

Its fortifications have survived attacks by Spanish, French and English pirates and privateers. The many forts that dot the coastline are symbols of the resistance and battles that secured Portuguese independence and national interests.

At the end of the monarchy, it was in the waters of Estoril that many sought refuge and escape. Aristocrats, nobles and others escaped through the ports along the Estoril coast to flee from the Republican forces.

In the hilltop enclave of Monte Estoril (situated between Estoril and Cascais), is the Verdades-Faria Museum, built in 1917 by Jorge O'Neil. In 1942, the building was bought by Mantero Belard and dedicated to the support of the arts and artists. Following his death, the building was donated to Cascais Council under the name of Verdades Faria and now houses the regional Museum of Portuguese Music.

During the Second World War, the region was a centre of spies and diplomatic secrecy, situations that provided the region with a cosmopolitan atmosphere and sophistication. Due to the vision of Fausto Cardoso de Figueiredo and his business partner Augusto Carreira de Sousa, it became an international tourist destination both during and after the Second World War.

During that time, several dignitaries and exiles came to Estoril: Miklós Horthy, the regent of Hungary (lived and died in exile after the Second World War); the Infante Juan, Count of Barcelona (father of Juan Carlos I of Spain) and the King resided in the territory, as did Umberto II of Italy and Carol II of Romania. Former King Edward VIII the Duke of Windsor, briefly resided in an Estoril villa as more direct and reliably safe routes to London from France for his escape were cut off by Blitzkrieg during the invasion.

It was also in this location that former Portuguese dictator António de Oliveira Salazar had a summer house. It was Salazar who ordered the construction of the E.N.6 motorway, more commonly referred to as the Avenida Marginal, in order for him to quickly travel by car between Cascais and Lisbon (until then the accessway was nothing more than a dirt road, where traffic could only travel at low speeds and make frequent stops). The roadway permitted the dictator to travel rapidly, and with fewer stops, so as not to be recognized easily in transit.

The 4th World Chess Champion Alexander Alekhine died in Estoril in 1946 under unknown circumstances.

The engineer John Tojeiro was born in Estoril.

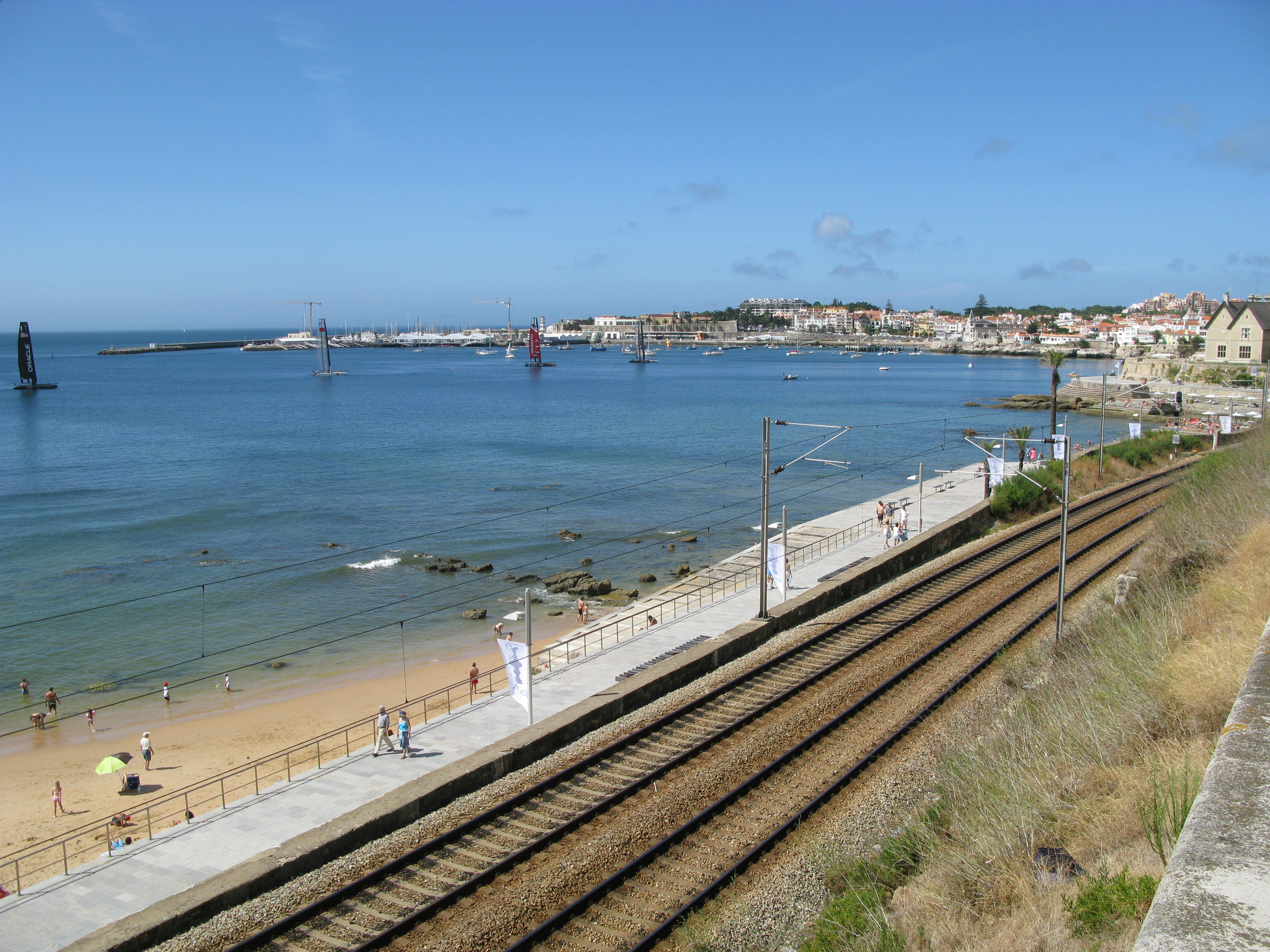
Looking towards Cascais from Estoril

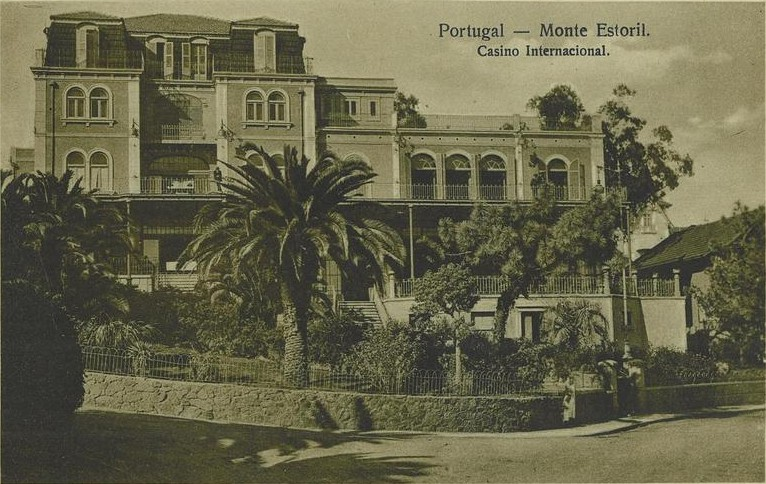
The Grande Casino Internacional Monte Estoril as seen in a 1920s postcard

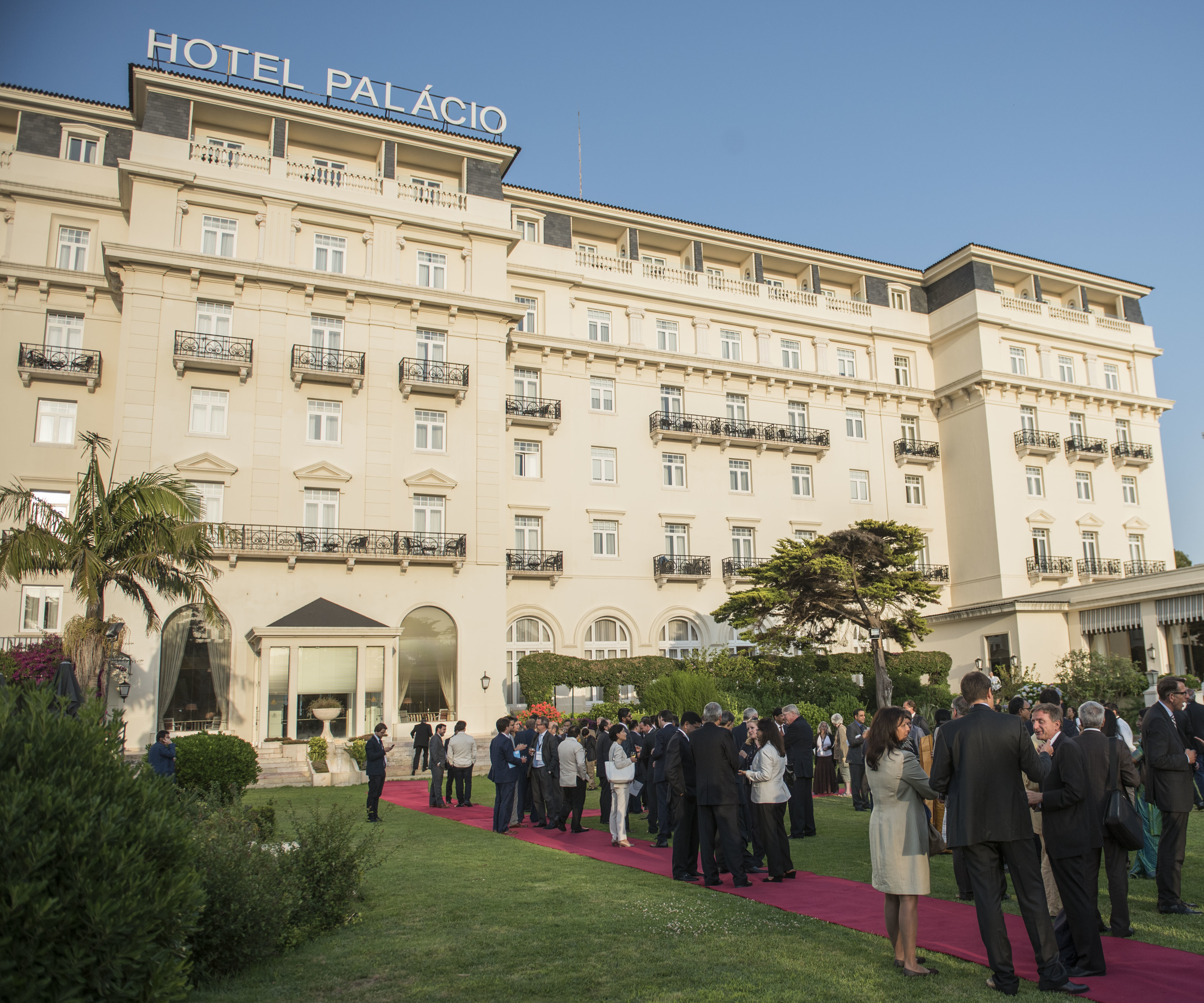
A Horasis Global Meeting reception at the Hotel Palácio, 2016

== Geography ==
Population of Estoril (1849–2011)
Year	Pop.	±%
1970	15,440	—
1981	24,312	+57.5%
1991	23,962	−1.4%
2001	23,769	−0.8%
2011	26,397	+11.1%

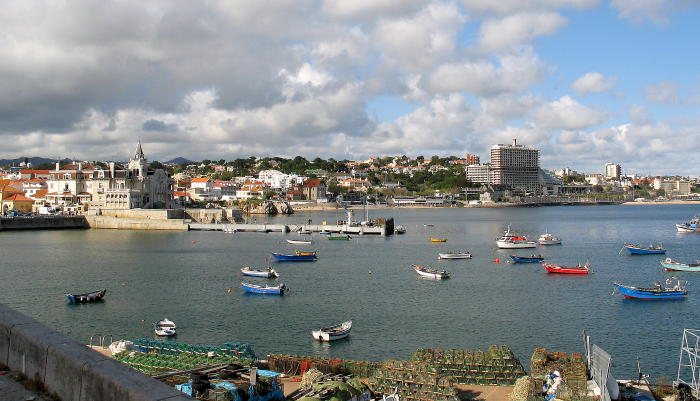
The coast of the civil parish of Cascais and Estoril, showing a mix of modern and historical architecture, as well as local fishing tradition

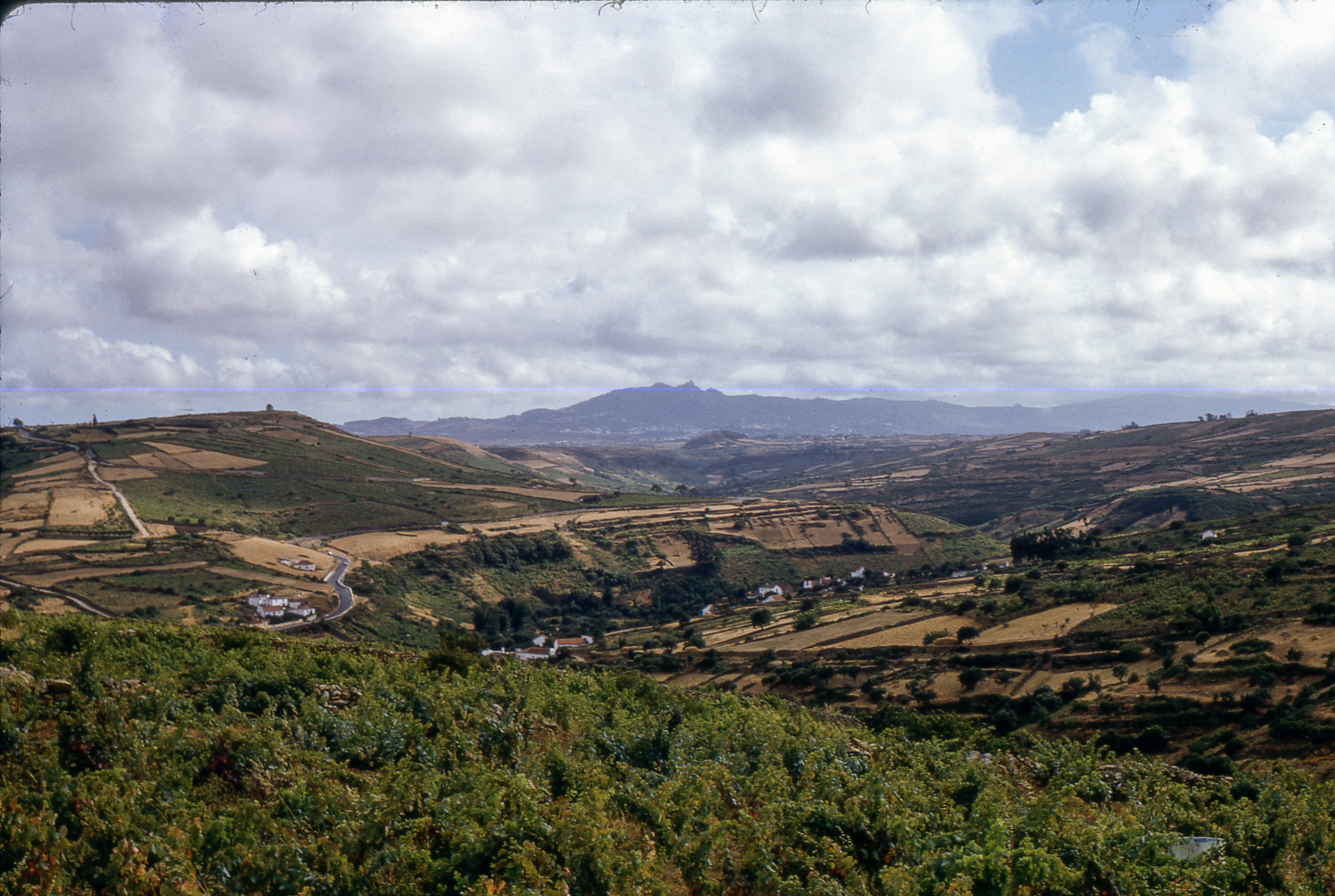
The Estoril Massif and geomorphology of the interior regions of the parish

The Estoril coast is relatively close to Lisbon, the Portuguese capital; it extends from Carcavelos, 15 kilometres (9.3 mi) from the capital, and stretches as far as the beach of Guincho (sometimes referred colloquially as the Costa de Estoril-Sintra or Costa de Lisboa). Estoril includes several smaller boroughs and localities along the coastline, namely (from east to west): São Pedro do Estoril, São João do Estoril, Santo António do Estoril (or simply Estoril) and Monte Estoril, as well as other to the interior.

Estoril is popularly recognized for the Casino Estoril, widely regarded as Europe's largest casino.

=== Climate ===
Climate data for Monte Estoril, 1931-1960
Month	Jan	Feb	Mar	Apr	May	Jun	Jul	Aug	Sep	Oct	Nov	Dec	Year
Record high °C (°F)	22.0 (71.6)	23.5 (74.3)	27.6 (81.7)	32.1 (89.8)	34.0 (93.2)	39.2 (102.6)	38.9 (102.0)	39.5 (103.1)	35.3 (95.5)	34.8 (94.6)	28.2 (82.8)	22.2 (72.0)	39.5 (103.1)
Mean daily maximum °C (°F)	14.9 (58.8)	15.8 (60.4)	17.3 (63.1)	19.4 (66.9)	20.8 (69.4)	23.6 (74.5)	25.7 (78.3)	26.0 (78.8)	24.9 (76.8)	22.0 (71.6)	18.4 (65.1)	15.7 (60.3)	20.4 (68.7)
Daily mean °C (°F)	11.8 (53.2)	12.3 (54.1)	14.0 (57.2)	15.7 (60.3)	17.1 (62.8)	19.6 (67.3)	21.4 (70.5)	21.7 (71.1)	20.8 (69.4)	18.3 (64.9)	15.0 (59.0)	12.4 (54.3)	16.7 (62.0)
Mean daily minimum °C (°F)	8.6 (47.5)	8.8 (47.8)	10.6 (51.1)	12.0 (53.6)	13.4 (56.1)	15.6 (60.1)	17.0 (62.6)	17.4 (63.3)	16.8 (62.2)	14.6 (58.3)	11.7 (53.1)	9.2 (48.6)	13.0 (55.4)
Record low °C (°F)	−0.3 (31.5)	−0.9 (30.4)	3.1 (37.6)	5.8 (42.4)	7.4 (45.3)	10.4 (50.7)	12.6 (54.7)	12.6 (54.7)	11.0 (51.8)	8.3 (46.9)	3.0 (37.4)	−0.9 (30.4)	−0.9 (30.4)
Average rainfall mm (inches)	97.0 (3.82)	67.6 (2.66)	91.0 (3.58)	49.6 (1.95)	38.0 (1.50)	13.0 (0.51)	2.4 (0.09)	4.4 (0.17)	28.61 (1.13)	68.4 (2.69)	82.3 (3.24)	93.9 (3.70)	636.21 (25.04)
Average rainy days (≥ 0.1 mm)	14	11	14	9	9	4	2	2	5	10	13	13	106
Average relative humidity (%)	82	77	78	73	74	74	71	73	75	76	79	81	76
Mean monthly sunshine hours	161.1	183.0	209.1	275.7	315.6	342.8	383.7	356.6	279.1	234.9	184.2	162.8	3,088.6
Percentage possible sunshine	53	60	56	70	71	77	85	84	75	68	61	55	68
Source: Instituto de Meteorologia

== Culture ==
The Museum of Portuguese Music- Casa Verdades de Faria hosts an important collection of musical instruments related to popular music, assembled by Michel Giacometti.

Christine McVie, from the band Fleetwood Mac, wrote a song called "Nights in Estoril" for their album Time.

Serbian-Portuguese author Dejan Tiago Stankovic published Estoril, a war novel in 2016, about Estoril during World War II.

== Sport ==
The major local sports club is the Grupo Desportivo Estoril Praia.

Motorsport events are frequent at the Estoril Circuit, although Formula One is no longer on the circuit's calendar. This was due to the circuit not coming up to FIA safety standards, leading to the 1997 event being canceled. Following a review on safety, Estoril was reshaped in 1999, the first two corners being affected the most. Today's circuit is 4.183 km (2.599 mi) in length and is run in a clockwise fashion. The circuit also used to host MotoGP, among other lower formula events.

Estoril Open is a tennis tournament within the ATP World Tour.

== Education ==
There are numerous education opportunities in and near Estoril, including a number of private schools for expats. The German community hosts a kindergarten and elementary school campus of the German School of Lisbon. True to the high-end living in the area, there are schools for tennis , art , and intensive academic training from age five through college . There are dozens of schools in the area. Most appear to be private, though six of the public schools can be reviewed at Agrupamento de Escolas de Parede.

== Notable people ==
- Fulgencio Batista (1901–1973) Cuban dictator, lived in Estoril briefly before dying.
- King Carol II of Romania lived in Estoril after abdication.
- Miklós Horthy de Nagybánya (1868–1957) lived here after exile from Hungary until his death.
- Eba Viegas (born 1999), Portuguese footballer
