= Pedro Nunes Tinoco =

Portuguese architect

Pedro Nunes Tinoco (died 8 February 1641) was a Portuguese architect who worked in what George Kubler described as the 'Plain Style', and is known also as the patriarch of a family of notable Portuguese architects. He was one of a privileged few to be awarded a royal apprenticeship to study architecture under Nicolau de Frias in Lisbon's Aula dos Paços da Ribeira, a school founded by Philip I of Portugal in 1584.

== Commissions ==
His first commission as a royal architect was the reformation of the convent of Santa Clara, which was destroyed in 1755. He later worked on the church and convent of Santa Marta (1616–36) and the church of Salvador (1616–17), both were located in Lisbon and were well received by critics at the time, contributing to his prestigious reputation.

In 1622 he designed the sacristy of the monastery of Santa Cruz in Coimbra, which was completed in 1624. A single barrel-vaulted space severe in appearance, offset by coloured marble decoration on the walls and azulejos (glazed tiles).

In 1624, succeeding Baltasar Alvares, Tinoco took over work on Terzi’s Monastery of São Vicente de Fora (which was begun in 1582).

He also made drawings for Roteiro das Águas Livres, a study for Lisbon’s water supply published by his son, João Nunes Tinoco in 1671.

== Style ==
His vault in the Santa Cruz monastery is described by The Dictionary of Art as “more rigorously in the manner of Alberti than the informal version characteristic of those Portuguese buildings that immediately followed the introduction of his style by Filippo Terzi." Broad pilasters carry the compartments across the wide entablature of the vault at Santa Cruz and follow the walls downwards, unifying its internal volume.
