= Raul Pires Ferreira Chaves =

Portuguese civil engineer (1889–1967)

- Born: 27 May 1889; Faro, Portugal
- Died: 18 August 1967 (aged 78); Lisbon
- Occupation: architect

Raúl Pires Ferreira Chaves (27 May 1889 – 18 August 1967) was a Portuguese civil engineer and inventor. A graduate of the Instituto Superior Técnico of Lisbon, he lived and primarily worked in Portugal, Portuguese Cape Verde and Portuguese Guinea (now Guinea-Bissau).

He invented and patented the "Sistema e material MURUS", a precursor to modern construction systems based on modular blocks, and a contribution to the evolution of the concept of prefabrication. He utilised these materials in many of his construction projects.

== Biography ==
Raúl Pires Ferreira Chaves was born in the city of Faro, Portugal. He was the son of Joaquim Manuel Ferreira Chaves and Maria Antónia Pires Ferreira Chaves. His brothers were Olímpio Ferreira Chaves and João Carlos Pires Ferreira Chaves, his sister was Maria Alexandrina Pires Ferreira Chaves. He was later married to Elvira da Conceição Ribeiro Ferreira Chaves and had four sons. He was diplomat in Civil Engineering at the High Technical Institute. In 1915, he moved to Cape Verde with his mother. He lived in the island of Maio and Santo Antão until 1926. He also lived with his first three sons.

From 1926 to 1932, he was director of public works in Portuguese Guinea (now Guinea-Bissau). He returned to Portuguese Guinea in 1940 and added a factory which made MURUS material system at a great scale. He was also president of the Industrial, Commercial and Agricultural Association of Portuguese Guinea. When he was president, he did architectural works mainly in Bissau including the Bissau Chamber of Commerce completed in 1958.

He attended the São Vicente Lyceum in Mindelo, Cape Verde, where he was professor.

He was Director of Public Works in Cape Verde. He executed various projects to improve habitability and contributed to the development of the archipelago, including the discovery and exploitation of fresh water in submarine sources on the island of Sal.

Also on the island, one of the buildings and plans he designed was the Sal International Airport (now Amílcar Cabral International Airport and Farol da Ponta Norte in the north of the island with its second tower built in 1941. Outside the island, he made an obelisk and an urban plan at Praça 5 do Outubro in the city of Praia.

With the same material project, he constructed different infrastructures including houses, aqueducts, irrigation canals, cisterns and bridges. The Portuguese State processed the "MURUS Material System" for use in public work projects, in Cape Verde, in favor of more expensive solutions.

In 1940, he returned to what was Portuguese Guinea, he built a factory which made MURUS material and system at a large scale. Later he was President of the Industrial, Commercial and Agricultural Association of (Portuguese) Guinea.

He made a competition to get the architectural project of a new seat, the "Commercial Chamber of Bissau", started in 1958, which became the most qualified architectural achievement in the city of Bissau. The project was displayed at an exposition in Lisbon at the General Exposition of Plastic Arts (Exposições Gerais de Artes Plásticas) of the National Fine Arts Society (Sociedade Nacional de Belas-Artes), during their colonial war of independence, it became the offices of the PAIGC, the African Party for the Independence of Guinea and Cape Verde.

He is still remembered in Guinea-Bissau by his suggestive nickname "Engineer Baga-baga".

He was an inspiration to the protagonist "Doutor Virgolino" ("Dr. Vlrgolino") in the children's book "Animais, esses desconhecidos” by Maria Helena da Costa Dias, illustrated by Tóssan, based on a true story.

He was also possibly in some Portuguese newspapers in the former colonies, numerous references to his person and his work.

He came back to Lisbon in the early 1960s. He died in August 1967.

== Positions held ==
- Professor do Liceu do Mindelo.
- Director das Obras Públicas da Guiné Portuguesa.
- Director das Obras Públicas de Cabo Verde.
- Presidente da Associação Industrial, Comercial e Agrícola da Guiné.

== Published works ==
- Chaves, Raúl Pires Ferreira (1946). Congresso do V centenário da descoberta da Guiné, promovido pela Sociedade de Geografia de Lisboa. Associação Comercial, Industrial e Agrícola da Guiné. p. 69.

== Sources ==
- Boletim da Sociedade de Geografia de Lisboa – Página 324; Sociedade de Geografia de Lisboa – 1928
- Boletim da Agência Geral das Colónias – Página 300; Portugal. Agência Geral das Colónias – 1932: "Raúl Pires Ferreira Chaves — Lisboa — Maquette da cidade e porto de Bissau (Guiné) — Medalha de Ouro.(...)"
- Repartição Provincial dos Serviços de Administração Civil, 1907–1979 – Página 210; Instituto do Arquivo Histórico Nacional (Praia, Cape Verde)
- CHAVES, Raúl Pires Ferreira. (Presidente da Direcção da Associação Comercial, Industrial e Agrícola da Guiné.). Carta endereçada ao Presidente do Sindicato Nacional dos Arquitectos, Lisboa, 11 de Novembro de 1949 [1 página]. Espólio: Biblioteca da SRS/Ordem dos Arquitectos [Manuscritos Avulsos]
- Catálogo da “X Exposição geral de Artes Plásticas 1956 – Dez anos de exposição Geral de Artes Plásticas 1945–1956”; Obra 124 – Projecto para a nova sede da Associação Comercial, Industrial e Agrícola da Guiné, a construir em Bissau.

=== Journals ===
- Miranda, Augusto (1938) Entrevista com o sr. engenheiro R. Pires Ferreira Chaves sobre a calamidade da ilha, Notícias de Cabo Verde] (in Portuguese), year 8, no. 179, accessed on 13 May 2010
- “Notícias de Cabo Verde” - March 25, 1937
- “Notícias de Cabo Verde” - June 1, 1937
- “Notícias de Cabo Verde” - February 1, 1938 (p. 1)
- “Notícias de Cabo Verde” - April 30, 1938
- “Notícias de Cabo Verde” - March 25, 1941 (p. 2)
- “A Verdade” - 31 October 1936 (p. 1)
- "Humanidade" - 26 February 1938
- “Diário de Notícias” Saturday - 10 June 1939 (p. 1)
- “1º de Janeiro” - 12 February 1940 (p. 1)
- “Novidades” - 18 February 1941 (pp. 2, 6)
- “Jornal do Comércio” - 8 January 1942 (p. 1)

== Reviews ==
- Técnica (1939) - p. 467
- A arquitectura portuguesa cerânica e edificação reunidas, July 1939, p. 19
- Revista portuguesa de comunicações, December 1936, p. 175
