= Ana Louisa Soares =

- Born: c. 1988
- Occupation: Architect
- Employer: Fala Atelier
- Website: https://falaatelier.com/

Ana Luisa Soares is a Portuguese architect and co-founder of Fala Atelier, an architectural firm based in Oporto. Her work has been featured globally, including at the Venice Biennale of Architecture, and in solo exhibitions for Fala Atelier in Panama, Italy, Macedonia, France, and Portugal. In addition to her firm's work, she has held several teaching positions in schools across Europe and North America.

== Early life and education ==
She was born in a small town near Porto called Marcos de Canaveses, where her early exposure to construction and architecture sparked her interest in the field.

She completed her master of architecture at FAUP (Faculdade de Arquitectura da Universidade do Porto) in 2007 and participated in an exchange program at Tokyo University in 2012. Before establishing her own practice, Ana Luisa gained professional experience by collaborating with international architecture offices, including Harry Gugger Studio in Basel in 2011 and Toyo Ito & Associates in Tokyo in 2012.

== Teaching ==
Ana Luisa has also been actively engaged in academia, serving as a visiting professor at various institutions such as HEAD Geneva, the Daniels Faculty at the University of Toronto, the Technical University of Munich, Munster FA, and Bratislava Faculty of Architecture.

== Fala Atelier ==
In 2012, Ana Luisa co-founded Fala Atelier with Filipe Magalhães; Ahmed Belkhodja later joined the firm in 2013. Fala means "informal conversation" in Portuguese, which reflects their approach to architecture. The firm initially focused on interior projects and gradually expanded to encompass new construction and building projects. Fala Atelier early projects garnered attention online and abroad, leading to their growth as a reputable architectural practice.

While Fala Atelier entered the field for the enjoyment it brings, the studio faces challenges in practicing in Portugal, where the impact of the economic crisis has been significant, leading to a market primarily focused on commercial refurbishments. The rise in tourism has resulted in the conversion of many historic buildings into Airbnb listings, which, while providing work opportunities, has also led to a considerable loss of heritage. Nevertheless, Fala Atelier thrives on refurbishment projects, using simple yet bold design moves to create spatial transformations. Their design philosophy involves opening up volumes to create expansive living spaces, which are then subtly divided using techniques and languages instead of rigid boundaries. Their interiors feature bright white backgrounds accentuated with vivid shades of greens and blues. The studio's carefully composed illustrations of their projects are not only representational but also integral to their design process, incorporating traces of occupation and inhabitants. Fala Atelier actively participates in architectural competitions, especially Swiss ones, where they explore more radical solutions that may inform their residential commissions.

Ana Luisa is known for her geometric and colorful aesthetic displayed in various building designs across Porto.

=== International Acclaim ===
Since 2013, Ana Luisa has contributed to Fala Atelier lectures and teaching engagements across multiple global cities, including London, Paris, Berlin, Milan, Venice, New York City, Chicago, and Sydney, among others.

Their work has also been showcased at significant architectural events such as the biennials in Venice and Chicago, as well as at the Serralves Foundation and the Pavillon de l’Arsenal in Paris. For the Serralves Foundation's "Live Uncertainty", an exhibition exploring contemporary art's portrayal of societal anxieties, Fala Atelier designed a folly pavilion that featured a cube-shaped structure with geometric cutouts covered by dusky pink curtains. The firm has also held solo exhibitions in Panama, Italy, Macedonia, France, and Portugal.

Recognized for their achievements, Fala Atelier projects have been featured in international media outlets, such as DOMUS, l’Architecture d’Aujourd’hui, and the Architectural Review.

The firm has also published '01,' a collection of their early projects, and received recognition from Rice University's spotlight award. Additionally, DOMUS magazine acknowledged Fala Atelier as one of the 50 most relevant young architecture offices worldwide in 2020.

== Completed Projects ==
=== Interior-focused Projects ===
- Principe Real Apartment, Lisbon
- Project 041, conversion of an old clothing store into a real estate agency, Porto
- Project 025, renovation of a 19th-century apartment, Lisbon's Chiado District
- Project 040, conversion of a windowless 200-square-meter garage, Lisbon
- Project 043, renovation of a 19th-century Graça apartment, Lisbon
- Project 082, "Warehouse Freixo", Porto, Portugal

=== New Construction and Building Projects ===
- Project 052, "naked apartments", Abragão, Portugal
- Project 050, a "very tiny palazzo", Porto, Portugal
- "Six Houses and a Garden", Porto, Portugal
