= João da Câmara Leme =

Portuguese illustrator and graphic designer

- Born: 1930; Beira, Mozambique
- Died: 3 June 1983 (aged 52–53); Lisbon, Portugal
- Known for: illustration, cover art

João da Câmara Leme (Beira, 1930 – Lisbon, 3 June 1983) was a Portuguese illustrator and graphic designer. He is known for his book cover designs, specifically those he produced during his long association with the Portugália book publisher.

== Life and career ==
Câmara Leme moved to Portugal in the 1950s. He designed hundreds of book covers for Portugália during the 1960s and 70s. His unique style and illustrations were recognized and used in many children literature books, including the collections Biblioteca dos Rapazes, Juvenil, and Os pequenos pioneiros, all also for Portugália.
