= Jacobetty Rosa =

Portuguese architect

Miguel Simões Jacobetty Rosa (24 February 1901–1970) was a Portuguese architect. One of his greatest works was the designing of the Estádio Nacional (National Stadium), located near Lisbon.

== Biography ==
Jacobetty Rosa was born in Alcobaça, Portugal on 24 February 1901.

Rosa's works include the Estádio Nacional do Jamor and the Bairro de São Miguel plan. He also worked on the No. 9 building at Avenida António Augusto de Aguiar and the No. 92-94 building at Rua da Infantaria, for which he won 1934 and 1931 Valmor Prizes. He was also known for town planning in Lisbon, and his works included one of the area's first national inns, Pousada de Santa Luzia, as well as urbanization plans for Portalegre, Vila Franca de Xira, Alhandra, Caldas de Monchique, Lagos and Torres Vedras. He was also involved in the construction of the Alvalade neighborhood near Lisbon, planning several areas of housing aimed at lower-income people displaced from the city center.

On August 5, 1944, he was made an Officer of the Military Order of Christ.
