= List of Portuguese records in Olympic weightlifting =

The following are the national records in Olympic weightlifting in Portugal. Records are maintained in each weight class for the snatch lift, clean and jerk lift, and the total for both lifts by the Weightlifting Federation of Portugal (Federação de Halterofilismo de Portugal).

== Current records ==
Key to tables: Awaiting ratification Not ratified or later rescinded by Weightlifting Federation of Portugal

=== Men ===
Event	Record	Athlete	Date	Meet	Place	Ref
60 kg
Snatch	90 kg	Standard				
Clean & Jerk	115 kg	Standard				
Total	205 kg	Standard				
65 kg
Snatch	95 kg	Standard				
Clean & Jerk	120 kg	Standard				
Total	215 kg	Standard				
70 kg
Snatch	100 kg	Standard				
Clean & Jerk	125 kg	Standard				
Total	225 kg	Standard				
75 kg
Snatch	110 kg	Standard				
Clean & Jerk	130 kg	Standard				
Total	240 kg	Standard				
85 kg
Snatch	120 kg	Standard				
Clean & Jerk	140 kg	Standard				
Total	260 kg	Standard				
95 kg
Snatch	131 kg	Standard				
Clean & Jerk	150 kg	Standard				
Total	280 kg	Standard				
110 kg
Snatch	155 kg	António Vital e Silva	7 June 2025	Portuguese Championships	Coimbrões, Portugal	
Clean & Jerk	170 kg	António Vital e Silva	7 June 2025	Portuguese Championships	Coimbrões, Portugal	
Total	325 kg	António Vital e Silva	7 June 2025	Portuguese Championships	Coimbrões, Portugal	
+110 kg
Snatch	150 kg	Standard				
Clean & Jerk	175 kg	Standard				
Total	325 kg	Standard				

=== Women ===
Event	Record	Athlete	Date	Meet	Place	Ref
49 kg
Snatch	51 kg	Melissa Pereira	10 October 2026		Oeiras, Portugal	
Clean & Jerk	68 kg	Standard				
Total	118 kg	Standard				
53 kg
Snatch	65 kg	Beatriz Azevedo	9 March 2025	Portuguese Cup	Baixa da Banheira, Portugal	
Clean & Jerk	84 kg	Margarida Pontes	7 June 2025	Portuguese Championships	Coimbrões, Portugal	
Total	146 kg	Margarida Pontes	7 June 2025	Portuguese Championships	Coimbrões, Portugal	
57 kg
Snatch	66 kg	Standard				
Clean & Jerk	85 kg	Standard				
Total	151 kg	Standard				
61 kg
Snatch	70 kg	Standard				
Clean & Jerk	90 kg	Standard				
Total	160 kg	Standard				
69 kg
Snatch	90 kg	Joana Chong	17 April 2025	European Championships	Chișinău, Moldova	
Clean & Jerk	114 kg	Mariana Batista	6 June 2026	Portuguese Championships	Oeiras, Portugal	
Total	200 kg	Mariana Batista	6 June 2026	Portuguese Championships	Oeiras, Portugal	
77 kg
Snatch	83 kg	Maria Oprea	9 March 2025	Portuguese Cup	Baixa da Banheira, Portugal	
Clean & Jerk	112 kg	Mariana Batista	15 November 2025		Sintra, Portugal	
Total	192 kg	Mariana Batista	15 November 2025		Sintra, Portugal	
86 kg
Snatch	90 kg	Rita Rodrigues	24 April 2026	European Championships	Batumi, Georgia	
Clean & Jerk	108 kg	Standard				
Total	198 kg	Rita Rodrigues	24 April 2026	European Championships	Batumi, Georgia	
+86 kg
Snatch	96 kg	Standard				
Clean & Jerk	116 kg	Standard				
Total	212 kg	Standard				

== Historical records ==
=== Men (2025–2026) ===
Event	Record	Athlete	Date	Meet	Place	Ref
71 kg
Snatch	100 kg	Standard				
Clean & Jerk	125 kg	Standard				
Total	225 kg	Standard				
79 kg
Snatch	110 kg	Standard				
Clean & Jerk	137 kg	Tiago Costa	7 June 2025	Portuguese Championships	Coimbrões, Portugal	
Total	245 kg	Standard				
88 kg
Snatch	122 kg	Rafael Batista	9 March 2025	Portuguese Cup	Baixa da Banheira, Portugal	
Clean & Jerk	148 kg	Vyacheslav Shysh	9 March 2025	Portuguese Cup	Baixa da Banheira, Portugal	
Total	267 kg	Rafael Batista	9 March 2025	Portuguese Cup	Baixa da Banheira, Portugal	
94 kg
Snatch	125 kg	Standard				
Clean & Jerk	145 kg	Standard				
Total	270 kg	Standard				

=== Men (2018–2025) ===
Event	Record	Athlete	Date	Meet	Place	Ref
55 kg
Snatch	81 kg	Standard				
Clean & Jerk	101 kg	Standard				
Total	182 kg	Standard				
61 kg
Snatch	98 kg	Ricardo Mendonça	3 June 2023		Baixa da Banheira, Portugal	
Clean & Jerk	128 kg	Ricardo Mendonça	8 June 2024	Portuguese Championships	Baixa da Banheira, Portugal	
Total	224 kg	Ricardo Mendonça	8 June 2024	Portuguese Championships	Baixa da Banheira, Portugal	
67 kg
Snatch	104 kg	Rafael Candeias	5 November 2022		Maia, Portugal	
Clean & Jerk	129 kg	Ricardo Mendonca	7 September 2024		Almada, Portugal	
Total	232 kg	Rafael Candeias	5 November 2022		Maia, Portugal	
73 kg
Snatch	125 kg	Rafael Candeias	7 September 2024		Almada, Portugal	
Clean & Jerk	150 kg	Rafael Candeias	7 September 2024		Almada, Portugal	
Total	275 kg	Rafael Candeias	7 September 2024		Almada, Portugal	
81 kg
Snatch	137 kg	Miguel Almeida	16 February 2024	European Championships	Sofia, Bulgaria	
Clean & Jerk	170 kg	Miguel Almeida	18 August 2023		Meissen, Germany	
Total	306 kg	Miguel Almeida	18 August 2023		Meissen, Germany	
89 kg
Snatch	151 kg	Miguel Almeida	25 March 2023		Baixa da Banheira, Portugal	
Clean & Jerk	180 kg	Miguel Almeida	3 December 2022		Baixa da Banheira, Portugal	
Total	321 kg	Miguel Almeida	25 March 2023		Baixa da Banheira, Portugal	
96 kg
Snatch	140 kg	João Melo	16 October 2021		Baixa da Banheira, Portugal	
Clean & Jerk	170 kg	Francisco Lourenço	3 June 2023		Baixa da Banheira, Portugal	
Total	302 kg	João Melo	3 July 2021		A Coruña, Spain	
102 kg
Snatch	144 kg	António Vital e Silva	31 March 2019		Aldeia de Paio Pires, Portugal	
Clean & Jerk	172 kg	Francisco Lourenço	3 December 2022		Baixa da Banheira, Portugal	
Total	311 kg	António Vital e Silva	8 June 2019		Baixa da Banheira, Portugal	
109 kg
Snatch	157 kg	António Vital e Silva	8 June 2024	Portuguese Championships	Baixa da Banheira, Portugal	
Clean & Jerk	181 kg	António Vital e Silva	14 October 2023		Maia, Portugal	
Total	337 kg	António Vital e Silva	14 October 2023		Maia, Portugal	
+109 kg
Snatch	158 kg	António Vital e Silva	26 March 2022		Baixa da Banheira, Portugal	
Clean & Jerk	186 kg	António Vital e Silva	4 June 2022		Baixa da Banheira, Portugal	
Total	339 kg	António Vital e Silva	4 June 2022		Baixa da Banheira, Portugal	

=== Women (2025–2026) ===
Event	Record	Athlete	Date	Meet	Place	Ref
48 kg
Snatch	48 kg	Standard				
Clean & Jerk	68 kg	Standard				
Total	116 kg	Standard				
58 kg
Snatch	81 kg	Rita Gomez	7 June 2025	Portuguese Championships	Coimbrões, Portugal	
Clean & Jerk	100 kg	Rita Gomez	15 April 2025	European Championships	Chișinău, Moldova	
Total	180 kg	Rita Gomez	15 April 2025	European Championships	Chișinău, Moldova	
63 kg
Snatch	90 kg	Joana Chong	26 September 2025		Gandia, Spain	
Clean & Jerk	105 kg	Joana Chong	26 September 2025		Gandia, Spain	
Total	195 kg	Joana Chong	26 September 2025		Gandia, Spain	

=== Women (2018–2025) ===
Event	Record	Athlete	Date	Meet	Place	Ref
45 kg
Snatch	45 kg	Joana Antunes	11 November 2023		Maia, Portugal	
Clean & Jerk	58 kg	Nair Pinto	15 April 2023	European Championships	Yerevan, Armenia	
Total	102 kg	Nair Pinto	15 April 2023	European Championships	Yerevan, Armenia	
49 kg
Snatch	56 kg	Margarida Pontes	8 June 2024	Portuguese Championships	Baixa da Banheira, Portugal	
Clean & Jerk	80 kg	Margarida Pontes	8 June 2024	Portuguese Championships	Baixa da Banheira, Portugal	
Total	136 kg	Margarida Pontes	8 June 2024	Portuguese Championships	Baixa da Banheira, Portugal	
55 kg
Snatch	68 kg	Beatriz Félix	8 June 2024	Portuguese Championships	Baixa da Banheira, Portugal	
Clean & Jerk	93 kg	Beatriz Félix	23 March 2024		Baixa da Banheira, Portugal	
Total	156 kg	Beatriz Félix	8 June 2024	Portuguese Championships	Baixa da Banheira, Portugal	
59 kg
Snatch	80 kg	Rita Gomez	7 September 2023	World Championships	Riyadh, Saudi Arabia	
Clean & Jerk	97 kg	Rita Gomez	8 June 2024	Portuguese Championships	Baixa da Banheira, Portugal	
Clean & Jerk	100 kg	Rita Gomez	15 April 2025	European Championships	Chișinău, Moldova	
Total	176 kg	Rita Gomez	8 June 2024	Portuguese Championships	Baixa da Banheira, Portugal	
Total	180 kg	Rita Gomez	15 April 2025	European Championships	Chișinău, Moldova	
64 kg
Snatch	88 kg	Joana Chong	8 June 2024	Portuguese Championships	Baixa da Banheira, Portugal	
Snatch	90 kg	Joana Chong	17 April 2025	European Championships	Chișinău, Moldova	
Clean & Jerk	106 kg	Mafalda Monteiro	23 March 2024		Baixa da Banheira, Portugal	
Total	189 kg	Joana Chong	23 March 2024		Baixa da Banheira, Portugal	
Total	195 kg	Joana Chong	17 April 2025	European Championships	Chișinău, Moldova	
71 kg
Snatch	95 kg	Aureleny Nunes	23 March 2024		Baixa da Banheira, Portugal	
Clean & Jerk	110 kg	Aureleny Nunes	23 March 2024		Baixa da Banheira, Portugal	
Total	205 kg	Aureleny Nunes	23 March 2024		Baixa da Banheira, Portugal	
76 kg
Snatch	81 kg	Teresa Tavares	16 September 2023	World Championships	Riyadh, Saudi Arabia	
Clean & Jerk	96 kg	Teresa Tavares	26 March 2023		Baixa da Banheira, Portugal	
Total	176 kg	Teresa Tavares	20 April 2023	European Championships	Yerevan, Armenia	
81 kg
Snatch	85 kg	Jéssica da Silva	7 December 2019		Baixa da Banheira, Portugal	
Clean & Jerk	107 kg	Jéssica da Silva	7 December 2019		Baixa da Banheira, Portugal	
Total	192 kg	Jéssica da Silva	7 December 2019		Baixa da Banheira, Portugal	
87 kg
Snatch	96 kg	Jéssica da Silva	22 April 2023	European Championships	Yerevan, Armenia	
Clean & Jerk	118 kg	Jéssica da Silva	22 April 2023	European Championships	Yerevan, Armenia	
Total	214 kg	Jéssica da Silva	22 April 2023	European Championships	Yerevan, Armenia	
+87 kg
Snatch	92 kg	Jéssica da Silva	3 December 2022		Baixa da Banheira, Portugal	
Clean & Jerk	122 kg	Jéssica da Silva	3 December 2022		Baixa da Banheira, Portugal	
Total	214 kg	Jéssica da Silva	3 December 2022		Baixa da Banheira, Portugal	
