= List of pro-Palestinian protests in Portugal =

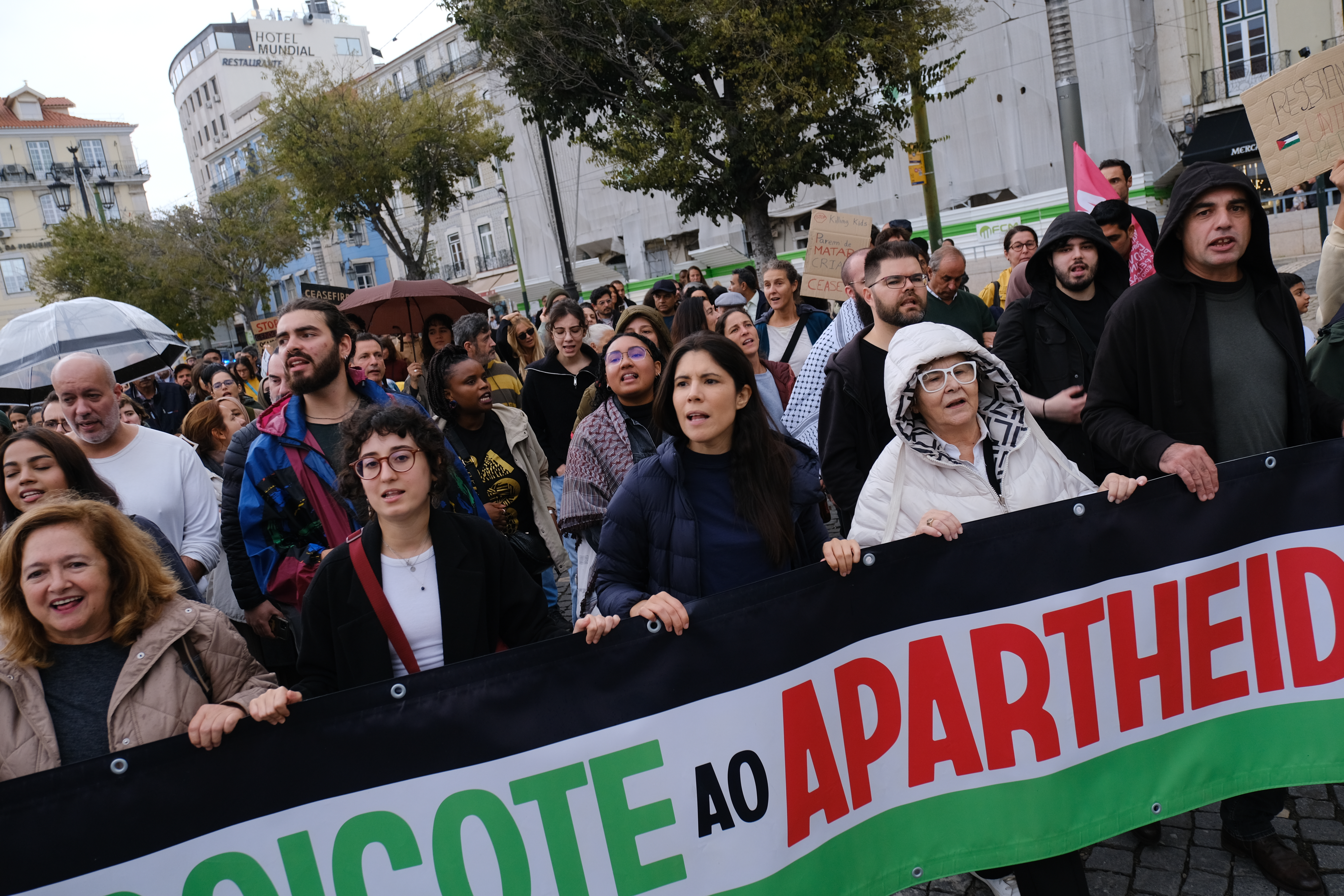
Pro-Palestine protest in Lisbon, Portugal, 29 October 2023

This is a list of pro-Palestinian protests in Portugal including demonstrations, marches, sit-ins, direct actions, and campus encampments in support of Palestinian rights.

== List ==
Estimated attendance is either mentioned explicitly in the references or a midpoint is used, i.e., 50 when dozens are mentioned, 500 when hundreds are mentioned, and so on.

=== Pre-2023 ===
Date	City/town	Estimated attendance	Description	Ref(s)
3 April 2002	Lisbon	?	Demonstration outside the Israeli Embassy in response to Israeli attacks of on Gaza and in solidarity with Palestinian prisoners, particularly minors.	
18 April 2002	Covilhã	300	Demonstration in the city center in solidarity with Palestine.	
20 March 2004	Lisbon	?	Protest in solidarity with Palestine and Iraq.	
7 September 2004	Lisbon	200	Demonstration in solidarity with Palestine.	
5 June 2007	Lisbon	50	Demonstration outside the Israeli Embassy.	
1 March 2008	Lisbon	600	Demonstration outside the Israeli Embassy in solidarity with Palestine and Lebanon.	
29 July 2009	Lisbon	?	Demonstration outside a concert by Leonard Cohen in protest of his upcoming concert in Israel.	
27 December 2009	Lisbon	?	Vigil outside the Israeli Embassy in response to the attacks of the Israeli army amid Operation Cast Lead.	
18 January 2010	Lisbon	?	Demonstration in the city center.	
2 June 2010	Lisbon	500	Demonstration outside the Israeli Embassy in response to the attacks of the Israeli army on the Gaza Freedom Flotilla which killed 10 humanitarian workers and injured dozens of others.	
19 March 2013	Lisbon	?	Demonstration and march through the city center in response to the death of Palestinian Arafat Jaradat at an Israeli prison.	
14 July 2014	Lisbon	?	Demonstration in the city center as a response to the escalation of Israel's attacks amid Operation Protective Edge.	
25 July 2014	Lisbon	?	Demonstration and march through the city center.	
7 August 2014	Lisbon	?	Demonstration outside the Israeli Embassy. Protesters demanded the end of Israel's occupation of Palestine.	
24 July 2015	Évora	?	Series of demonstrations and cultural events as part of the "Acampamento pela Paz" ("Camp for Peace"). Lasted until 26 July.	
25 April 2016	Lisbon	?	March through the city center as part of the Carnation Revolution commemorations.	
1 May 2016	Lisbon	?	March through the city center as part of the International Workers' Day parade.	
29 July 2016	Silves	?	Series of demonstrations and cultural events as part of the "Acampamento pela Paz" ("Camp for Peace"). Lasted until 31 July.	
20 November 2016	Porto	?	Spraying of red paint on the facade of a restaurant from chef José Avillez for his collaboration in an event supported by the Ministry of Tourism and Ministry of Foreign Affairs of Israel.	
25 April 2017	Lisbon	?	March through the city center as part of the Carnation Revolution commemorations. Participants also demanded the recognition of Palestine as a state.	
1 May 2017	Lisbon	?	March through the city center as part of the International Workers' Day parade.	
28 July 2017	Évora	?	Series of demonstrations and cultural events as part of the "Acampamento pela Paz" ("Camp for Peace"). Lasted until 30 July.	
31 January 2018	Lisbon	100	Demonstration in front of the Israeli Embassy in solidarity with Palestine and against Trump's recognition of Jerusalem as capital of Israel.	
25 April 2018	Lisbon	?	March through the city center as part of the Carnation Revolution commemorations.	
1 May 2018	Lisbon	?	March through the city center as part of the International Workers' Day parade.	
14 May 2018	Lisbon	500	Demonstration in the city center.	
25 April 2019	Lisbon	?	March through the city center as part of the Carnation Revolution commemorations.	
1 May 2019	Lisbon	?	March through the city center as part of the International Workers' Day parade.	
6 December 2019	Lisbon	500	Demonstration in the city center against the visit of Benjamin Netanyahu and Mike Pompeo.	
25 April 2021	Lisbon	?	March through the city center as part of the Carnation Revolution commemorations.	
6 July 2020	Lisbon	300	Demonstration in the city center in protest of Israel's annexation of the West Bank.	
1 May 2021	Lisbon	?	March through the city center as part of the International Workers' Day parade.	
17 May 2021	Lisbon	500	Demonstration and march through the city center.	
17 May 2021	Porto	500	Demonstration and march through the city center.	
24 May 2021	Braga	100	Demonstration in the city center.	
31 May 2021	Lisbon	?	Demonstration in the city center.	
5 June 2021	Setúbal	?	Demonstration and march through the city center.	
29 November 2021	Porto	50	Demonstration in the city center to commemorate the International Day of Solidarity with the Palestinian People.	
29 November 2021	Lisbon	500	Demonstration in the city center to commemorate the International Day of Solidarity with the Palestinian People.	
25 April 2022	Lisbon	?	March through the city center as part of the Carnation Revolution commemorations.	
1 May 2022	Lisbon	?	March through the city center as part of the International Workers' Day parade.	
16 May 2022	Lisbon	100	Demonstration in the city center in memory of Palestinian-American journalist Shireen Abu Akleh that was killed by Israeli forces on 11 May.	
26 October 2022	Lisbon	500	Demonstration in the city center.	
27 October 2022	Porto	?	Demonstration in the city center.	
29 November 2022	Lisbon	100	Demonstration at Casa do Alentejo. Participants held a minute of silence for Palestinian victims of the Israeli army and also commemorated writer José Saramago, co-founder of the Portuguese Movement for the Rights of Palestinian People and for Peace in the Middle East.	

=== 2023 ===
Date	City/town	Estimated attendance	Description	Ref(s)
25 April 2023	Lisbon	?	March through the city center as part of the Carnation Revolution commemorations.	
1 May 2023	Lisbon	?	March through the city center as part of the International Workers' Day parade.	
10 June 2023	Lisbon	?	March through the city center as part of an annual anti-racism demonstration.	
15 June 2023	Porto	500	Demonstration in the city center.	
17 June 2023	Lisbon	?	March through the city center as part of the Lisbon Pride parade.	
17 June 2023	Lisbon	500	Demonstration and march through the city center.	
7 July 2023	Lisbon	100	Demonstration in the city center.	
21 July 2023	Melides	500	Series of demonstrations, exhibitions, debates, and pro-Palestine events. Lasted until 23 July.	
22 July 2023	Melides	?	Demonstration by the coast as part of the "Nadar com Gaza" ("Swimming with Gaza") initiative. Participants swam in protest of the sea blockade on Gaza.	
28 September 2023	Lisbon	?	Demonstration in front of Finalmente Club to protest an LGBTQ event sponsored by the Israeli embassy.	
9 October 2023	Lisbon	500	Demonstration in the city center.	
11 October 2023	Lisbon	500	Demonstration in the city center.	
14 October 2023	Porto	100	Demonstration in the city center.	
17 October 2023	Porto	100	Demonstration and march through the city center.	
18 October 2023	Lisbon	300	Demonstration and march through the city center. Three protesters were arrested.	
19 October 2023	Évora	?	Demonstration in the city center.	
25 October 2023	Braga	?	Demonstration in the city center.	
26 October 2023	Porto	300	Demonstration in the city center.	
26 October 2023	Coimbra	500	Demonstration in the city center.	
28 October 2023	Vila Nova de Gaia	?	Demonstration in the city center.	
29 October 2023	Lisbon	1,000	Demonstration and march through the city center.	
31 October 2023	Viana do Castelo	50	Demonstration in the city center.	
2 November 2023	Coimbra	?	Night vigil in the city center.	
2 November 2023	Viseu	?	Demonstration in the city center.	
3 November 2023	Portalegre	?	Demonstration in the city center.	
3 November 2023	Lisbon	500	Night vigil in the city center.	
4 November 2023	São João da Madeira	?	Demonstration in the city center.	
5 November 2023	Lisbon	50	Demonstration in front of Belém Palace. President Marcelo Rebelo de Sousa made an appearance and was criticized by a protester.	
5 November 2023	Porto	1,000	Demonstration in the city center.	
8 November 2023	Leiria	?	Demonstration in the city center.	
8 November 2023	Santarém	?	Demonstration in the city center.	
8 November 2023	Faro	200	Night vigil in the city center.	
11 November 2023	Lisbon	?	Demonstration in the city center.	
11 November 2023	Porto	?	Demonstration in the city center.	
15 November 2023	Almada	?	Demonstration in the city center.	
15 November 2023	Baixa da Banheira	?	Demonstration in the city center.	
15 November 2023	Montijo	?	Night vigil in the city center.	
15 November 2023	Setúbal	?	Demonstration in the city center.	
16 November 2023	Beja	250	Demonstration and march through the city center.	
16 November 2023	Coimbra	?	Demonstration in the city center. Participants painted and wrote messages of support for Palestine on a large piece of cloth.	
17 November 2023	Covilhã	?	Demonstration in the city center.	
17 November 2023	Guimarães	?	Demonstration in the city center.	
18 November 2023	Lisbon	5,000	Demonstration and march through the city center.	
21 November 2023	Lisbon	?	Defacing the facade of an office from railway company Steconfer with red paint in protest of its businesses in East Jerusalem.	
21 November 2023	Coimbra	500	Night vigil and march through the city center.	
23 November 2023	Braga	60	Demonstration on campus by students and staff of the University of Minho.	
26 November 2023	Porto	500	Demonstration and march through the city center.	
28 November 2023	Évora	50	Demonstration in the city center.	
29 November 2023	Funchal	?	Demonstration in the city center to commemorate the International Day of Solidarity with the Palestinian People.	
29 November 2023	Palmela	?	Demonstration in the city center to commemorate the International Day of Solidarity with the Palestinian People.	
29 November 2023	Lisbon	500	Demonstration in the city center to commemorate the International Day of Solidarity with the Palestinian People.	
8 December 2023	Lisbon	5,000	Demonstration and march through the city center.	
14 December 2023	Coimbra	?	Placing of several small Palestinian flags in various roundabouts in the city representing children killed by the Israeli army.	
16 December 2023	Lisbon	2,000	Human chain and march through the city center.	
19 December 2023	Porto	500	Human chain in the city center.	
21 December 2023	Lisbon	?	Demonstration in the city center.	
22 December 2023	Lisbon	?	Defacing of the facade of the Câmara Municipal de Lisboa.	

=== 2024 ===
Date	City/town	Estimated attendance	Description	Ref(s)
14 January 2024	Lisbon	5,000	Demonstration and march through the city center.	
24 January 2024	Porto	500	Demonstration in the city center.	
1 February 2024	Lisbon	?	Demonstration in the city center.	
10 February 2024	Lisbon	3,500	Demonstration and march through the city center.	
14 February 2024	Coimbra	?	Demonstration in the city center.	
16 February 2024	Viana do Castelo	?	Demonstration in the city center. Participants formed a human chain.	
16 February 2024	Lisbon	50	Demonstration in front of the Israeli Embassy.	
19 February 2024	Porto	500	Demonstration near University of Porto and march towards the city center.	
22 February 2024	Lisbon	?	Demonstrations at Sete Rios railway station and Cais do Sodré railway station.	
6 March 2024	Lisbon	?	Demonstration in the city center.	
19 March 2024	Porto	?	Demonstration in the city center.	
23 March 2024	Lisbon	?	March through the city center as part of a feminist demonstration.	
24 March 2024	Lisbon	?	Demonstration in the city center.	
26 March 2024	Barreiro	50	Demonstration outside Barreiro railway station.	
26 March 2024	Setúbal	50	Demonstration at the train station.	
3 April 2024	Cacilhas	?	Demonstration in the city center.	
3 April 2024	Funchal	?	Demonstration in the city center.	
6 April 2024	Lisbon	?	Demonstration and march from the Israeli Embassy towards the city center.	
7 April 2024	Lisbon	?	Demonstration and march through the city center.	
9 April 2024	Rio Tinto	?	Demonstration in the city center.	
11 April 2024	Lisbon	?	Disruption of a speech by president Marcelo Rebelo de Sousa, criticizing his stance on climate change and comments made about a diplomatic representative of the Palestinian Authority.	
12 April 2024	Viana do Castelo	?	Demonstration in the city center.	
25 April 2024	Lisbon	?	March through the city center as part of the Carnation Revolution commemorations.	
25 April 2024	Porto	?	March through the city center as part of the Carnation Revolution commemorations.	
1 May 2024	Lisbon	?	March through the city center as part of the International Workers' Day parade.	
1 May 2024	Porto	?	March through the city center as part of the International Workers' Day parade.	
7 May 2024	Coimbra	?	Demonstration on the campus of the University of Coimbra.	
7 May 2024	Lisbon	70	Encampment and occupation of a building of the Faculty of Psychology of University of Lisbon. Lasted until 10 May. Ended with police intervention. Some protesters were injured, including parents of students that were supporting outside. Eight protesters were arrested.	
8 May 2024	Porto	?	Sit-in in front of the Reitoria building of the University of Porto.	
8 May 2024	Coimbra	500	Demonstration and march through the city center.	
11 May 2024	Torres Novas	?	Demonstration in the city center.	
11 May 2024	Porto	500	Demonstration and march through the city center.	
11 May 2024	Lisbon	5,000	Demonstration and march through the city center.	
15 May 2024	Braga	?	Demonstration on campus by students and staff of the University of Minho.	
15 May 2024	Porto	50	Demonstration in the city center.	
15 May 2024	Lisbon	500	Night vigil in on occasion of the 76 years of the Nakba.	
17 May 2024	Porto	?	Encampment on the campus of the Faculty of Sciences of the University of Porto.	
17 May 2024	Lisbon	20	Occupation of the building of the Ministry of Foreign Affairs. Ended with police intervention.	
18 May 2024	Lisbon	?	Demonstration in the city center.	
18 May 2024	Lisbon	20	Occupation of a building C of the Faculty of Social and Human Sciences of the NOVA University Lisbon.	
18 May 2024	Santo Tirso	?	Demonstration in the city center.	
18 May 2024	Póvoa de Varzim	?	Night vigil in the city center.	
21 May 2024	Coimbra	30	Encampment in front of the Faculdade de Letras of the University of Coimbra. Lasted until 19 June. Ended with protesters disbanding on their own.	
22 May 2024	Lisbon	200	Demonstration outside Cinema São Jorge in protest of celebrations of the anniversary of creation of the state of Israel.	
27 May 2024	Lisbon	?	Occupation of a building of the NOVA Medical School of the NOVA University Lisbon. Ended with police intervention. Five protesters were arrested. Some protesters were injured, including four that had to be taken to the hospital.	
28 May 2024	Braga	50	Encampment on the campus of the University of Minho. Lasted until 21 June. Ended with protesters disbanding on their own.	
28 May 2024	Lisbon	500	Demonstration and march through the city center.	
30 May 2024	Porto	500	Demonstration and march through the city center.	
3 June 2024	Porto	?	Demonstration in the city center.	
5 June 2024	Faro	500	Demonstration at the Faro docks.	
6 June 2024	Porto	?	Counter-demonstration during a rally by the AD party where Ursula von der Leyen was taking a speech. Ended by police intervention. One protester was hospitalized. One protester was arrested.	
7 June 2024	Lisbon	?	Defacing of the facade of the Ministry of Foreign Affairs.	
8 June 2024	Leiria	?	Demonstration during the Book Fair of Leiria. Activists talked with president Marcelo about recognizing the state of Palestine but he made no comment on the matter.	
8 June 2024	Lisbon	?	March through the city center as part of a climate demonstration. Some protesters also threw balloons with red paint at a building of the European Parliament at Centro Europeu Jean Monnet.	
8 June 2024	Sintra	?	March through the city center as part of the Lisbon Pride parade.	
10 June 2024	Lisbon	?	March through the city center as part of an annual anti-racism demonstration.	
14 June 2024	Porto	250	Demonstration and march through the city center.	
19 June 2024	Coimbra	?	Demonstration at the campus of the University of Coimbra.	
19 June 2024	Coimbra	?	Demonstration in the city center.	
19 June 2024	Beja	150	Demonstration in the city center.	
3 July 2024	Lisbon	?	Series of demonstrations at the Parque das Nações marina in support of the Handala flotilla that was docked there for a few days. Lasted until 7 July.	
5 July 2024	Évora	?	Demonstration and march through the city center.	
19 July 2024	Melides	500	Series of demonstrations, exhibitions, debates, and pro-Palestine events. Lasted until 21 July.	
20 July 2024	Melides	?	Demonstration by the coast as part of the "Nadar com Gaza" ("Swimming with Gaza") initiative. Participants swam in protest of the sea blockade on Gaza.	
24 September 2024	Lisbon	50	Student vigil at the Faculty of Social and Human Sciences of the NOVA University Lisbon.	
2 October 2024	Coimbra	100	Demonstration and march through the city center.	
3 October 2024	Portalegre	?	Demonstration and march through the city center.	
3 October 2024	Setúbal	200	Demonstration at Praça de Bocage.	
4 October 2024	Alpiarça	?	Demonstration in the city center.	
4 October 2024	Covilhã	50	March through the city center.	
5 October 2024	Viseu	?	Demonstration in the city center.	
6 October 2024	Porto	500	Demonstration and march through the city center.	
7 October 2024	Évora	100	Demonstration in the city center. Participants also showed solidarity for the Lebanese victims of Israel's invasion of Lebanon.	
7 October 2024	Porto	500	Demonstration and march through the city center.	
8 October 2024	Leiria	?	Demonstration in the city center.	
9 October 2024	Beja	?	Demonstration and march through the city center. Protesters inaugurated a mural in solidarity of Palestinians.	
9 October 2024	Viana do Castelo	?	Demonstration in the city center.	
9 October 2024	Guarda	50	Demonstration in the city center.	
10 October 2024	Braga	?	Demonstration and march through the city center.	
10 October 2024	Espinho	100	Demonstration in the city center.	
12 October 2024	Vila Real	?	Demonstration outside Mercado Municipal.	
12 October 2024	Lisbon	5,000	Demonstration and march through the city center.	
9 November 2024	Lisbon	?	Demonstration and march through the city center.	
9 November 2024	Porto	?	Demonstration and march through the city center.	
9 November 2024	Lisbon	50	Demonstration near the port against the docking of a Maersk ship involved in the transport of weapons to Israel.	
29 November 2024	Coimbra	?	Demonstration and march through the city center to commemorate the International Day of Solidarity with the Palestinian People.	
29 November 2024	Lisbon	?	Demonstration outside the Israeli Embassy to commemorate the International Day of Solidarity with the Palestinian People.	
29 November 2024	Porto	500	Demonstration in the city center to commemorate the International Day of Solidarity with the Palestinian People.	
30 November 2024	Lisbon	500	Demonstration and march through the city center.	
9 December 2024	Lisbon	?	Defacing of three banks tied to the Israeli state.	

=== 2025 ===
Date	City/town	Estimated attendance	Description	Ref(s)
18 January 2025	Lisbon	?	Demonstration and march through the city center.	
30 January 2025	Lisbon	50	Demonstration in front of Assembly of the Republic.	
18 February 2025	Porto	?	Demonstration in the city center.	
18 February 2025	Lisbon	500	Demonstration in the city center.	
8 March 2025	Coimbra	?	March through the city center as part of the International Women's Day commemorations.	
8 March 2025	Lisbon	?	March through the city center as part of the International Women's Day commemorations.	
18 March 2025	Lisbon	200	Demonstration in the city center.	
30 March 2025	Lisbon	?	Demonstration in the city center.	
30 March 2025	Porto	300	Demonstration and march through the city center.	
25 April 2025	Coimbra	?	March through the city center as part of the Carnation Revolution commemorations.	
25 April 2025	Lisbon	?	March through the city center as part of the Carnation Revolution commemorations.	
1 May 2025	Coimbra	?	March through the city center as part of the International Workers' Day parade.	
1 May 2025	Lisbon	?	March through the city center as part of the International Workers' Day parade.	
1 May 2025	Porto	?	March through the city center as part of the International Workers' Day parade.	
5 May 2025	Lisbon	?	Demonstration in the city center. Protesters showcased a large banner containing the names of 5,000 Palestinian children killed by the Israeli army.	
21 May 2025	Braga	?	Demonstration by students and staff of the University of Minho.	
21 May 2025	Porto	300	Demonstration in the city center on occasion of the 77 years of the Nakba.	
23 May 2025	Lisbon	500	Demonstration at Rossio.	
27 May 2025	Lisbon	?	Demonstration in front of Assembly of the Republic.	
28 May 2025	Lisbon	500	Demonstration in the city center.	
30 May 2025	Coimbra	?	Demonstration in the city center.	
31 May 2025	Mafra	?	Demonstration in the city center.	
1 June 2025	Porto	?	Demonstration in the city center.	
4 June 2025	Lisbon	500	Demonstration in the city center.	
7 June 2025	Viseu	50	Night vigil in front of the Viseu Municipal Chamber.	
8 June 2025	Lisbon	?	March through the city center as part of the Lisbon Pride parade.	
9 June 2025	Lisbon	?	Demonstration in the city center against the attack by Israel on the Madleen flotilla in international waters.	
10 June 2025	Lisbon	?	March through the city center as part of an annual anti-racism demonstration.	
11 June 2025	Lisbon	?	Disruption of a presentation by the Minister of Foreign Affairs Paulo Rangel at the annual Lisbon Book Fair. Rangel discredited the criticism raised by the protesters and reiterated that "no other government has done as much as this one".	
13 June 2025	Porto	1,300	Night vigil in the city center.	
17 June 2025	Lisbon	500-5,000	Demonstration and march through the city center.	
20 June 2025	Póvoa de Varzim	?	Night vigil in the city center.	
21 June 2025	Braga	50	Silent protest in front of the rectorate of the University of Minho. Protesters demanded a "break with indifference and appeal to collective conscience in the face of the ongoing genocide".	
1 July 2025	Coimbra	?	Demonstration and march through the city center. Participants formed a human chain.	
4 July 2025	Viseu	?	Demonstration against the military industry in the municipality outside a conference held by the city council.	
4 July 2025	Faro	200	Demonstration in the city center.	
5 July 2025	Porto	?	Demonstration and march through the city center.	
5 July 2025	Lisbon	450	Demonstration and march through the city center.	
11 July 2025	Lisbon	150	Demonstration in front of Assembly of the Republic during a meeting on the recognition of Palestine as a state.	
11 July 2025	Aveiro	?	Night vigil in the city center.	
23 July 2025	Porto	?	Night vigil in front of the Porto Municipal Chamber.	
23 July 2025	Lisbon	100	Noise demonstration (cacerolazo) in the city center.	
30 July 2025	Lisbon	30	Demonstration in front of the Israeli Embassy.	
7 August 2025	Lisbon	50	Demonstration in several locations where participants read the names of Palestinian children killed by Israel.	
17 August 2025	Lisbon	50	Demonstration by the finish line of the Volta a Portugal bicycle racing competition, in protest of the participation of the Israeli team.	
21 August 2025	Coimbra	?	Demonstration in several locations where participants read the names of Palestinian children killed by Israel.	
11 September 2025	Lisbon	?	Demonstration organized by pro-Palestine Jews and Israelis in front of the German Embassy.	
15 September 2025	Nazaré	100	Vigil in the city center.	
16 September 2025	Lisbon	?	Demonstration at Faculty of Social and Human Sciences of the NOVA University Lisbon in solidarity with Palestinian student Tarek al-Farra that accepted into a Master program at the university but prevent from leaving Gaza due to Israel's blockade.	
16 September 2025	Lisbon	100	Demonstration in the city center.	
16 September 2025	Porto	500	Demonstration and march through the city center.	
20 September 2025	Porto	?	Demonstration and march through the city center.	
20 September 2025	Lisbon	5,000	Demonstration and march through the city center.	
25 September 2025	Ermesinde	?	Demonstration at Largo da Estação.	
28 September 2025	Espinho	?	Demonstration in the city center.	
2 October 2025	Faro	?	Demonstration in the city center.	
2 October 2025	Braga	100	Demonstration in the city center in response to Israel's interception and kidnapping of activists on board of the Global Sumud Flotilla.	
2 October 2025	Viana do Castelo	100	Demonstration in the city center in response to Israel's interception and kidnapping of activists on board of the Global Sumud Flotilla.	
2 October 2025	Coimbra	300	Demonstration and march through the city center.	
2 October 2025	Porto	1,000	Blocking of road traffic and march through the city center.	
2 October 2025	Lisbon	1,000	Demonstration in front of the Israeli embassy and march through the city center at night.	
4 October 2025	Lisbon	3,000	Demonstration and march through the city center in response to Israel's interception and kidnapping of activists on board of the Global Sumud Flotilla. Later some activists occupied the Rossio railway station. One protester was electrocuted after climbing to a train.	
7 October 2025	Lisbon	?	Demonstration and march through the city center.	
7 October 2025	Porto	?	Demonstration and march through the city center.	
7 October 2025	Braga	?	Demonstration and march through the city center.	
8 October 2025	Funchal	30	Demonstration in the city center.	
8 October 2025	Santarém	50	Demonstration outside Teatro Sá da Bandeira de Santarém.	
15 October 2025	Porto	?	Demonstration outside Campanhã railway station.	
18 October 2025	Lisbon	500	Demonstration and march through the city center.	
19 October 2025	Lisbon	1	Climbing of 25 de Abril Bridge by an activist that unfurled a large Palestinian flag. The protester was arrested after descending.	
19 October 2025	Lisbon	10,000	Demonstration and march through the city center. Protesters also denounced the passage of F-35 fighter jets in Lajes Field destined to Israel.	
20 October 2025	Coimbra	?	Demonstration outside Instituto Pedro Nunes against the participation of Israeli companies on Coimbra Tech Challenge.	
22 October 2025	Porto	200	Demonstration in the city center.	
23 October 2025	Coimbra	?	Demonstration outside the city hall against the participation of companies tied to Israel on Coimbra Tech Challenge.	
31 October 2025	Setúbal	50	Demonstration in the city center.	
31 October 2025	Baixa da Banheira	50	Demonstration outside the train station.	
7 November 2025	Loulé	?	Demonstration and march through the city center against Israel's breaking of the ceasefire.	
8 November 2025	Lisbon	?	March through the city center as part of a large demonstration for worker's rights.	
12 November 2025	Senhora da Hora	50	Demonstration near the subway station.	
21 November 2025	Vila Nova de Gaia	50	Demonstration near the subway station.	
25 November 2025	Lisbon	?	Demonstration and debate outside Casa dos Bicos.	
25 November 2025	Lisbon	100	Demonstration outside Casa da Moeda in protest of its manufacturing of two million coins for Israel.	
29 November 2025	Porto	500	Demonstration and march through the city center to commemorate the International Day of Solidarity with the Palestinian People.	
29 November 2025	Lisbon	5,000	Demonstration and march through the city center to commemorate the International Day of Solidarity with the Palestinian People.	

=== 2026 ===
Date	City/town	Estimated attendance	Description	Ref(s)
28 February 2026	Lisbon	?	Demonstration in solidarity with Palestine and march through the city center as part of a larger protest on worker's rights.	
8 March 2026	Lisbon	?	March through the city center as part of the International Women's Day commemorations.	
14 March 2026	Porto	100	Demonstration and march through the city center.	
14 March 2026	Lisbon	5,000	Demonstration near the US embassy in protest against the Iran war, and in solidarity with Venezuela, Cuba, Palestine, and others.	
30 March 2026	Lisbon	?	March through the city center to commemorate the Land Day.	
14 April 2026	Coimbra	?	Demonstration at University of Coimbra in protest of a documentary about October 7. The students contested that the documentary has been debunked and was presented in an uncritical way and without the necessary historical context. The teacher doing the screening has spoken multiple times publicly in support of Israel.	
25 April 2026	Lisbon	?	March through the city center as part of the Carnation Revolution commemorations.	
1 May 2026	Lisbon	?	March through the city center as part of the International Workers' Day parade.	
7 May 2026	Porto	50	Demonstration outside Hotel Sheraton where Fórum IRMEX (Iberian Middle East Exchange) 2026 was taking place hosting pro-Israel speakers.	
15 May 2026	Lisbon	?	Demonstration in the city center on occasion of the 78 years of the Nakba.	
6 June 2026	Lisbon	?	March through the city center as part of the Lisbon Pride parade.	
10 June 2026	Lisbon	?	March through the city center as part of an annual anti-racism demonstration.	
25 July 2026	Sines	50	Demonstration by the coast as part of the "Nadar com Gaza" ("Swimming with Gaza") initiative. Participants swam in protest of the sea blockade on Gaza.	
30 August 2026	Carcavelos	100	Demonstration by the coast as part of the "Nadar com Gaza" ("Swimming with Gaza") initiative. Participants swam in protest of the sea blockade on Gaza.	
25 September 2026	Guimarães	?	Demonstration in the city center.	
2 October 2026	Lisbon	5,000	Demonstration in the city center.	
7 October 2026	Lisbon	500	Protest in solidarity with Palestine, Iran, and Cuba, and against the upcoming visit of United States secretary of state Marco Rubio.	
10 October 2026	Lisbon	5,000	Demonstration and march through the city center.	

== See also ==
- Gaza war protests
- Boycott, Divestment, and Sanctions
- Lists of pro-Palestinian protests
