= Artificial caves of Casal do Pardo =

Prehistoric necropolis near Setúbal, Portugal

- Grutas Artificiais de Casal do Prado
- Grutas da Quinta do Anjo
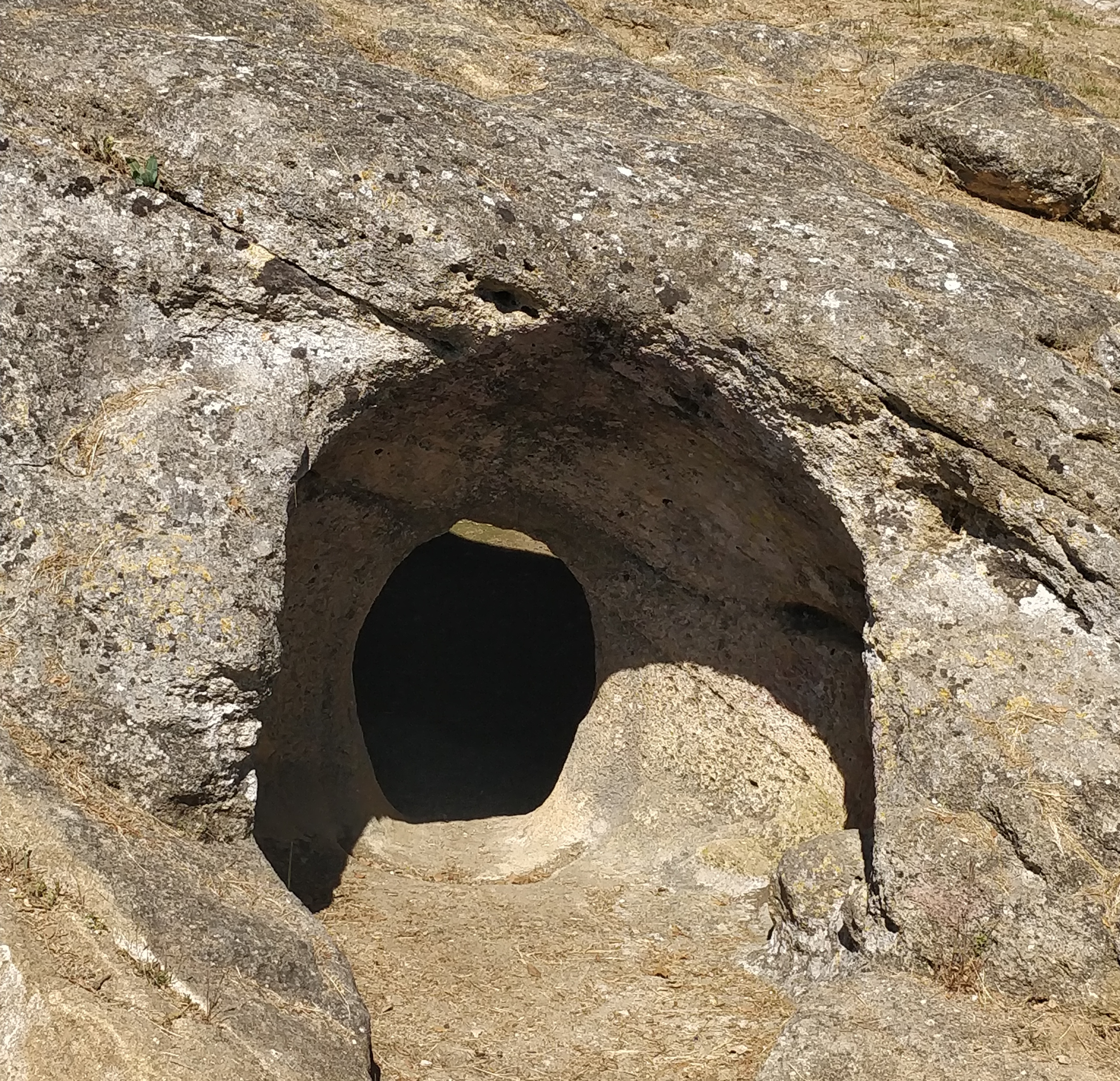
- Interactive map of Artificial caves of Casal do Pardo
- 38°33′51″N 8°56′19″W
- Type: Necropolis
- Periods: Neolithic, Chalcolithic,
- Cultures: Beaker culture
- Location: Palmela, Setúbal District, Portugal

Site notes
- Excavation dates: 1876-78; 1900-05 (approx.)
- Archaeologists: António Mendes Correia and Agostinho Jose da Silva (1876-78); António Inácio Marques da Costa (20th century)
- Discovered: 1876
- Condition: Fair
- Public access: Yes

The four Artificial caves of Casal do Pardo (Portuguese: Grutas artificiais do Casal do Pardo), also known as the Caves of Quinta do Anjo, were neolithic tombs. They are situated in Palmela municipality in the Setúbal District, of Portugal, about 25 km (16 mi) south of the capital of Lisbon. These caves were classified as a National Monument of Portugal in 1934.

== History ==
The caves were the first of their type to be discovered in Portugal with the site being identified as a result of limestone extraction on the site. They consist of four independent tombs or hypogea cut in soft, miocene limestone, using stone tools. They were built into a small, elongated hill and oriented in an East-West direction. All of the four caves were dug out around 3000 BCE, and were probably used and re-used until around 2000 BCE. They are considered to be good examples of the artificial necropolis used between the late Neolithic and the end of the Chalcolithic, with the same purpose as the Antas or dolmens that are found widely in Portugal, which followed the same burial traditions. The two best-preserved tombs of this complex contain a larger circular domed burial chamber, 4–5 metres in diameter and with a height of up to 2.30 metres. Cave 1 was 9.75 metres long in total, although part of the corridor has since been covered by a road. The limestone excavation damaged two of the caves, which now appear more as alcoves than caves. The site was first studied between 1876 and 1878 by António Mendes Correia and Agostinho Jose da Silva, under the supervision of Carlos Ribeiro. Excavations were resumed at the beginning of the 20th century under the direction of António Inácio Marques da Costa.

== Description ==
The fact that the tombs were dug into the soft limestone with stone tools is evidence that they predated the use of copper. The entrances opened on to a corridor, leading to an ante-chamber and a large hemispherical chamber with a circular hole above, through which corpses could be lowered when the chamber and corridor were full. The hole was then covered with a lid. Rock-cut tombs are very common in the Mediterranean. Similar caves in Portugal include the Necropolis of Carenque, and the Artificial caves of Alapraia, both to the west of Lisbon.

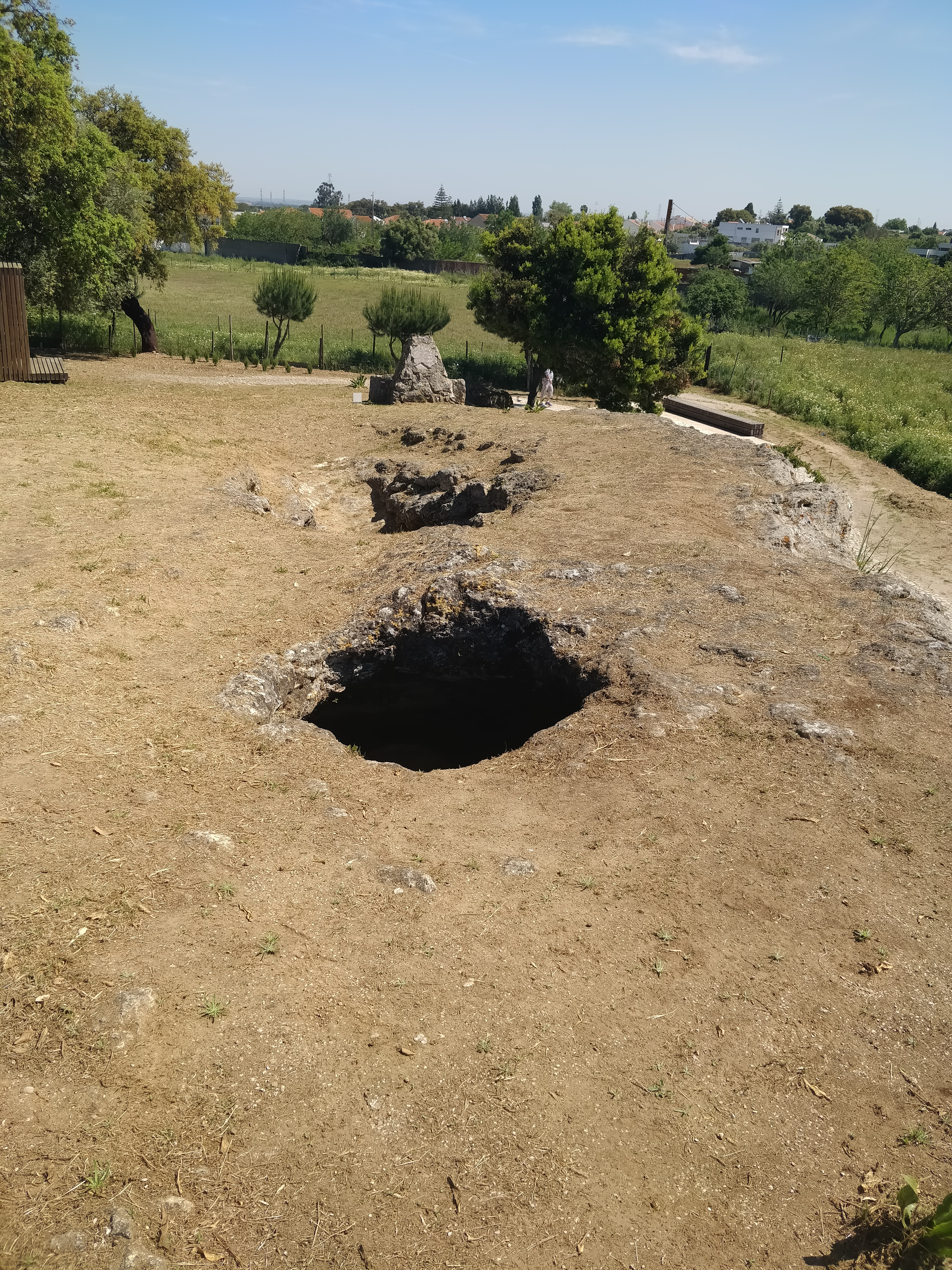
Artificial caves of Casal do Pardo, showing the holes deliberately left in the ceilings

The excavations at the caves have discovered a wide variety of items, including microliths, arrowheads, axes and adzes of polished stone, and flint blades, as well as a variety of polished stone artifacts, ritual objects, limestone idols, shale items and bone buttons. Jewellery and pendants were also identified, with some in gold, as well as ceramics, including some from the bell beaker culture decorated with dotted or linear markings. Items found at the site were catalogued in 1965 by the German archaeologist, Vera Leisner. One problem faced in improving knowledge of the site and its findings is that the items taken by the early archaeologists were not related to the location and context in which they were found. Consequently, modern-day archaeologists have been unable to discover their original contexts.

Burials with bell beaker pottery have been found chiefly in the access corridors. Bell beaker vases and bowls generally occurred in the latter half of the 3rd millennium BCE. The vases were shaped like an inverted bell, while the bowls found at the site and at the nearby Castro of Chibanes followed a distinctive decorative incision technique that has become known as the "Palmela type". The site also contained many sculpted baetyls, or sacred stones, including representations of the phallus. Metallic items discovered all contained traces of arsenic. A few small gold items were found, together with leaf-shaped arrowheads in copper. Items of personal adornment were made with shells, ivory, shark teeth, bone (including for buttons), lignite, and minerals.

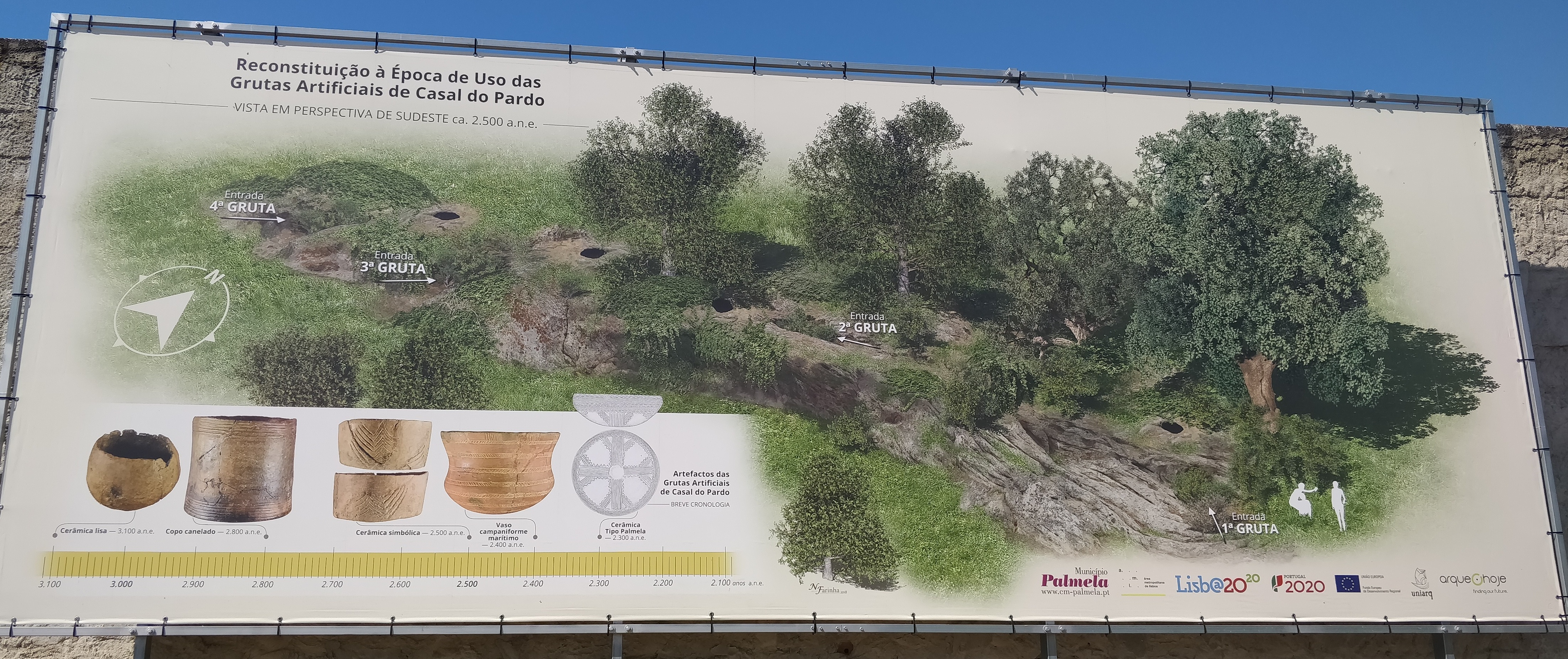
Artificial caves of Casal do Pardo. Noticeboard illustrating the caves as they were originally, together with some of the artifacts found
