= Necropolis of Carenque =

Prehistoric necropolis near Lisbon, Portugal

- Necrópole de Carenque
- Grutas artificiais do Tojal de Vila Chã
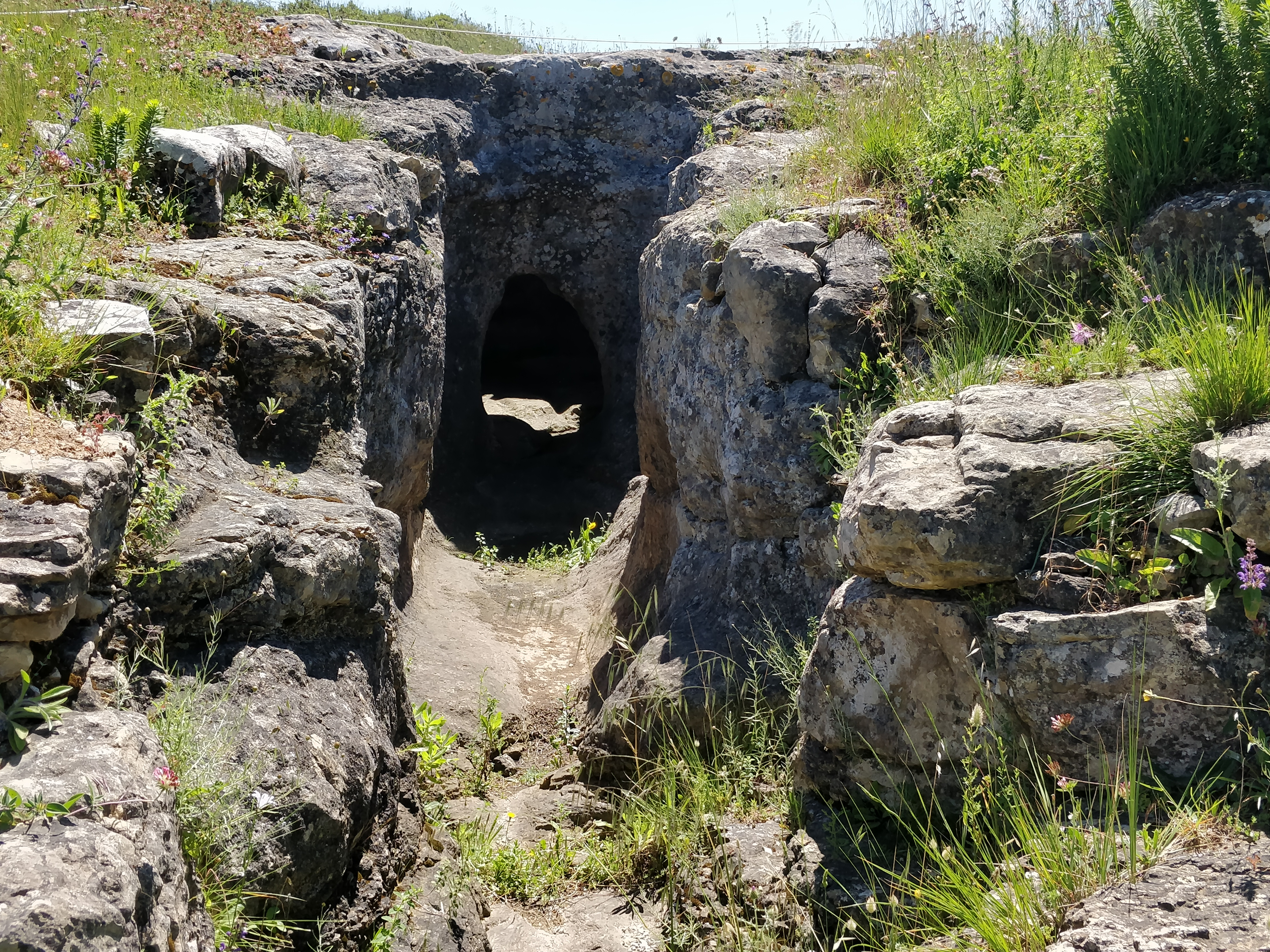
- Interactive map of Necropolis of Carenque
- 38°46′24″N 9°14′38″W
- Type: Necropolis or artificial caves
- Periods: Neolithic, Chalcolithic,
- Cultures: Beaker culture
- Location: Amadora, Lisbon District, Portugal

Site notes
- Excavation dates: 1932
- Archaeologists: Manuel Heleno
- Discovered: 1932
- Condition: Good
- Owner: Amadora Municipality
- Public access: Yes (weekends)
- Website: http://www.cm-amadora.pt/cultura/museu-municipal-de-arqueologia/674-nucleo-monografico-da-necropole-de-carenque-2.html

The Necropolis of Carenque (Portuguese: Necrópole de Carenque) is an archaeological site consisting of three well-preserved late Neolithic collective sepulchres or tombs, dating back to about 3000 BCE, which are dug into smooth limestone outcrops. It is situated in the municipality of Amadora in the Lisbon District of Portugal.

== History ==
The site was discovered and excavated in 1932 and was classified as a National Monument in 1936. The short time between discovery in 1932 and this classification owed much to the important role played at the time by the archaeologist responsible for the caves' discovery, Manuel Heleno, who was acting-Director of what is now the National Archaeology Museum of Portugal.

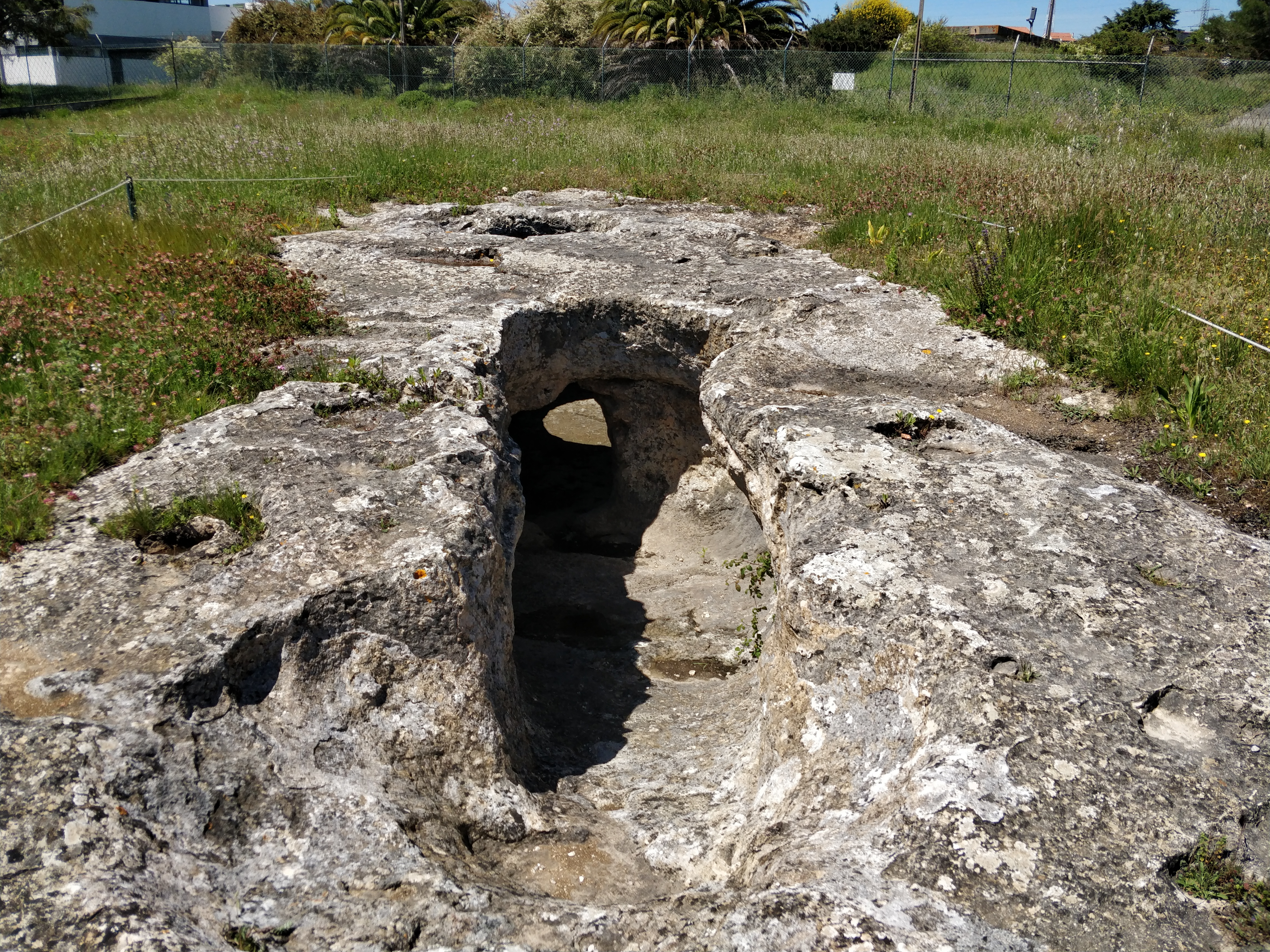
Cave 2

Tombs such as these are usually designated as 'artificial caves' or hypogea because they were excavated in the rock. They are part of a Mediterranean funeral tradition that was widely practised in the area of what is now known as Portugal. Other examples include the Artificial caves of Casal do Pardo and the Artificial caves of Alapraia, and there are also many examples of megalithic dolmen, where burials were made inside structures made of large stones.

The first depositions of corpses in the Necropolis of Carenque go back to the end of the Neolithic period (around 3000 BCE), when there was already an agro-pastoral economy in the area, as opposed to hunting and gathering. There is also evidence for its later use in the Chalcolithic during the Copper Age until around 2000 BCE. Dug into Albian-Cenomanian limestone, the three caves each have an access corridor that communicates with the funeral chamber through a small portal. The chamber has a hole, or skylight, in its roof and this and the corridor were closed with limestone slabs. In his field notebooks Heleno refers to a small fourth cave, which was already almost entirely destroyed.

Little is known of the dead buried there, such as whether they all came from the same village. It appears the first corpses may have been placed against the walls, in a fetal position, and surrounded by votive offerings. The later use of the Necropolis in the Copper Age disturbed the original arrangement of the bones and artifacts, making it difficult to reconstitute the arrangements inside the tomb. Items found during the excavation included numerous human bones as well as ceramics, including those from the beaker culture, and lithic and metallic materials, such as arrowheads and daggers. Votive offerings identified included limestone idols, such as smooth or decorated cylinders, as well as adzes, bone pins and miscellaneous beads. Most of the artifacts and human remains are on deposit at the National Archaeology Museum in Lisbon and have been extensively studied.

The necropolis is one of the best-preserved of its kind. The similarity between the design of the three caves clearly indicates that the builders were following a clear plan. Cave 1, to the east, has a circular chamber with a diameter of about 4.5 metres. The skylight was 1.30 metres high, while the entrance to the chamber was 0.83 metres high. The narrow entrance corridor was around 5 metres long and was probably originally covered with limestone slabs. The entrance to this cave faces approximately northeast, while the entrances to the other two face approximately southeast. Cave 2 has a circular chamber also with a diameter of approximately 4.5 metres and a corridor of 5.5 metres. The chamber is about 1.75 metres high and the skylight has a diameter of 1.60 metres. Cave 3, the smallest, has a chamber with a diameter of just under 4 metres. The skylight appears to be larger than those of the other caves but this is because it has eroded over the years.
