= Joaquina Soares =

Portuguese archaeologist and museologist

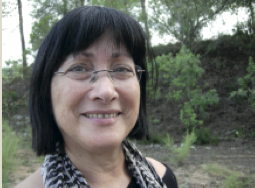
- Born: 15 January 1953; Torrão, Alcácer do Sal, Portugal
- Other names: Maria Joaquina Coelho Soares
- Education: NOVA University Lisbon; University of Lisbon
- Scientific career
- Fields: Archaeology; Museology
- Institutions: Museum of Archaeology and Ethnography of the Setúbal District

Maria Joaquina Coelho Soares (born 1953) is a Portuguese archaeologist, director of the Museum of Archaeology and Ethnography of the Setúbal District of Portugal and former professor at the Faculty of Social Sciences and Humanities of the NOVA University Lisbon. She was one of the first two professional archaeologists in Portugal.

== Education ==
Soares was born on 15 January 1953 in Torrão in the Alcácer do Sal municipality, an area in which, from the late 19th-century, the archaeologist, José Leite de Vasconcelos identified many early settlements. Starting work after school she undertook university studies relatively late in life, obtaining a degree in geography (1990) and a master's degree in human geography and regional and local planning from the Faculty of Arts of the University of Lisbon (1992), and a PhD in prehistory from the Faculty of Social Sciences and Humanities of the NOVA University, with a thesis on social transformations during the 3rd millennium BC in the south of Portugal: The settlement of Porto das Carretas (2011). She also completed a postgraduate degree in museology at the Universidade Lusófona in Lisbon (2003).

== Archaeological career ==
=== Excavations ===
Soares worked as an archaeologist for the Sines Area Office in the southwest of Portugal from 1972 to 1988 and for the Southwest Alentejo and Vicentine Coast Natural Park (SNPRCN) from 1988 to 2000. Most of her research has been concentrated in the southwest of Portugal. She has directed and co-directed more than one hundred excavations, often working with Carlos Tavares da Silva. Some of her main work has included studies in the south of Portugal of the first Chalcolithic fortifications from the 3rd millennium BCE; the Neolithic Revolution process on the southwest Coast; the middle Bronze Age settlements in southwest Iberia and the fortified settlement of Monte da Tumba, near her birthplace of Torrão. In 1984 and 1985 she carried out assessments of the cultural heritage impact of the Alqueva Dam on the Guadiana river and, subsequently, was part of the large archaeological project conducted prior to the closing of the floodgates of the new dam. Between 1985 and 1987 she worked with Da Silva on the Great Dolmen of Zambujeiro, near Évora. More recently, she and Da Silva have excavated the Chalcolithic and Roman sites of the Castro of Chibanes in the Arrábida Nature Park near the town of Palmela, and she has excavated the megalithic monument of Pedra Branca. She has also been conducting urban archaeology in the Setúbal area. Together with Da Silva, she organised the first National Congress of Urban Archaeology in Setúbal in 1985. Other conferences she organized include one on the production and trade of fish preparations on the Atlantic coast of the Iberian Peninsula during protohistory and the Roman period, and one on the prehistory of wetlands salt landscapes

=== Publications ===
Soares has authored or co-authored more than one hundred journal articles and has authored, co-authored or edited eleven books. Since 1975, she has been the co-director of the magazine Setúbal Arqueológica, and since 2004 the editorial coordinator of the magazine Musa - Museus, Arqueologia & Outros Patrimónios.

== Academic career ==
Soares was a researcher and teacher at the Faculty of Social Sciences and Humanities NOVA University between 2009 and 2013, teaching courses on prehistory and protohistory. She was an invited professor at the University of Lisbon in 2015 and 2016.

== Museum director ==
Soares was the founder of the Museum of Archaeology and Ethnography of the Setúbal District (MAEDS) in 1974, and was its director until 2023. In that year she was elected director of the League of Friends of Setúbal and Azeitão (LASA), a non-profit regional association geared towards the defence and dissemination of cultural, environmental and social heritage from a regional-development perspective. In 2003, also emphasising a regional approach, she promoted the Setúbal District Intermuseum Forum (FIDS).

== Awards ==
Soares received the 2016 award of the Associação Portuguesa de Museologia (APOM) in the category of best research work for her PhD work on the settlement of Porto das Carretas.
