= Nossa Senhora da Tourega (Évora) =

- Civil parish
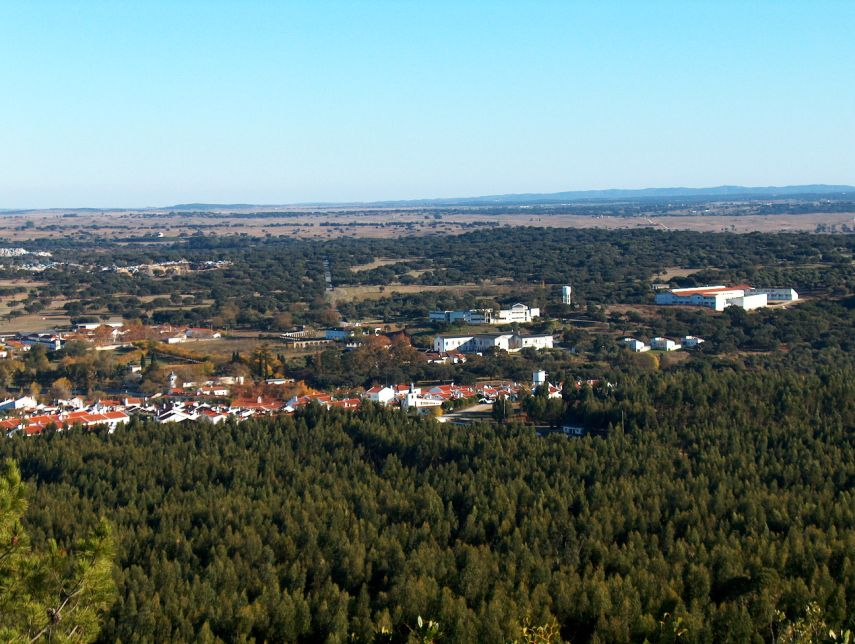
- The village of Valverde, as seen from the Castle of Giraldo, Nossa Senhora da Tourega

- Location in Portugal
- Coordinates: 38°27′19″N 8°1′18″W
- Country: Portugal
- Region: Alentejo
- Intermunic. comm.: Alentejo Central
- District: Évora
- Municipality: Évora

Area
  - Total: 196.19 km^{2} (75.75 sq mi)
- Elevation: 195 m (640 ft)

Population (2011)
  - Total: 686
  - Density: 3.50/km^{2} (9.06/sq mi)
- Time zone: UTC+00:00 (WET)
  - Summer (DST): UTC+01:00 (WEST)
- Postal code: 7000-092
- Area code: 266
- Patron: Nossa Senhora da Assunção
- Website: http://www.evora.net/jfnstourega/

Nossa Senhora da Tourega is a former civil parish in the municipality of Évora, Portugal. In 2013, the parish merged into the new parish Nossa Senhora da Tourega e Nossa Senhora de Guadalupe. The population in 2011 was 686, in an area of 196.19 km^{2} (75.75 sq mi).

== History ==
In 1864, then known as Ourega, the parish had approximately 576 inhabitants. By 1878, that figure had grown to 688 inhabitants, when it was now commonly referred to as Tourega (Nossa Senhora da Assunção).

Between 1911 and 1920 the parish was annexed to the neighbouring parish of Nossa Senhora da Graça do Divor, which was only remedied on 18 October 1926 (Decree-Law No.12/509). The census of 1930 identified a population of 1186, which in 1936 included the parish of São Brás do Regedouro.

Until 22 August 2003, it was known as Nossa Senhora da Torega.

== Geography ==
Nossa Senhora da Tourega, is a rural civil parish in the municipality of Évora, with its parish seat in the village of Valverde. Access to this community is accomplished through the EN 380 (Évora-Alcáçovas).

== Architecture ==
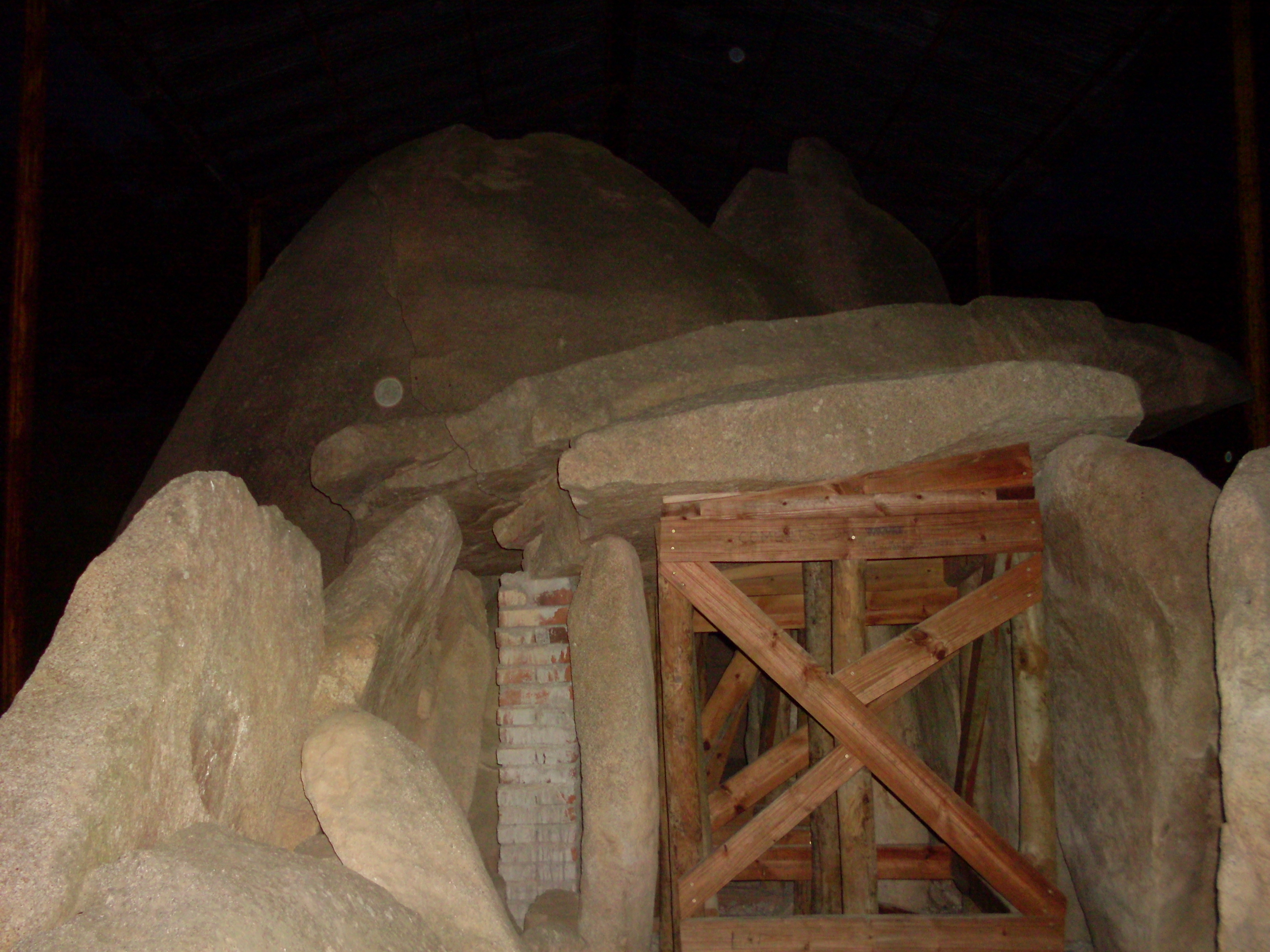
The Great Dolmen of Zambujeiro discovered on the outskirts of the parish, outside of Valverde

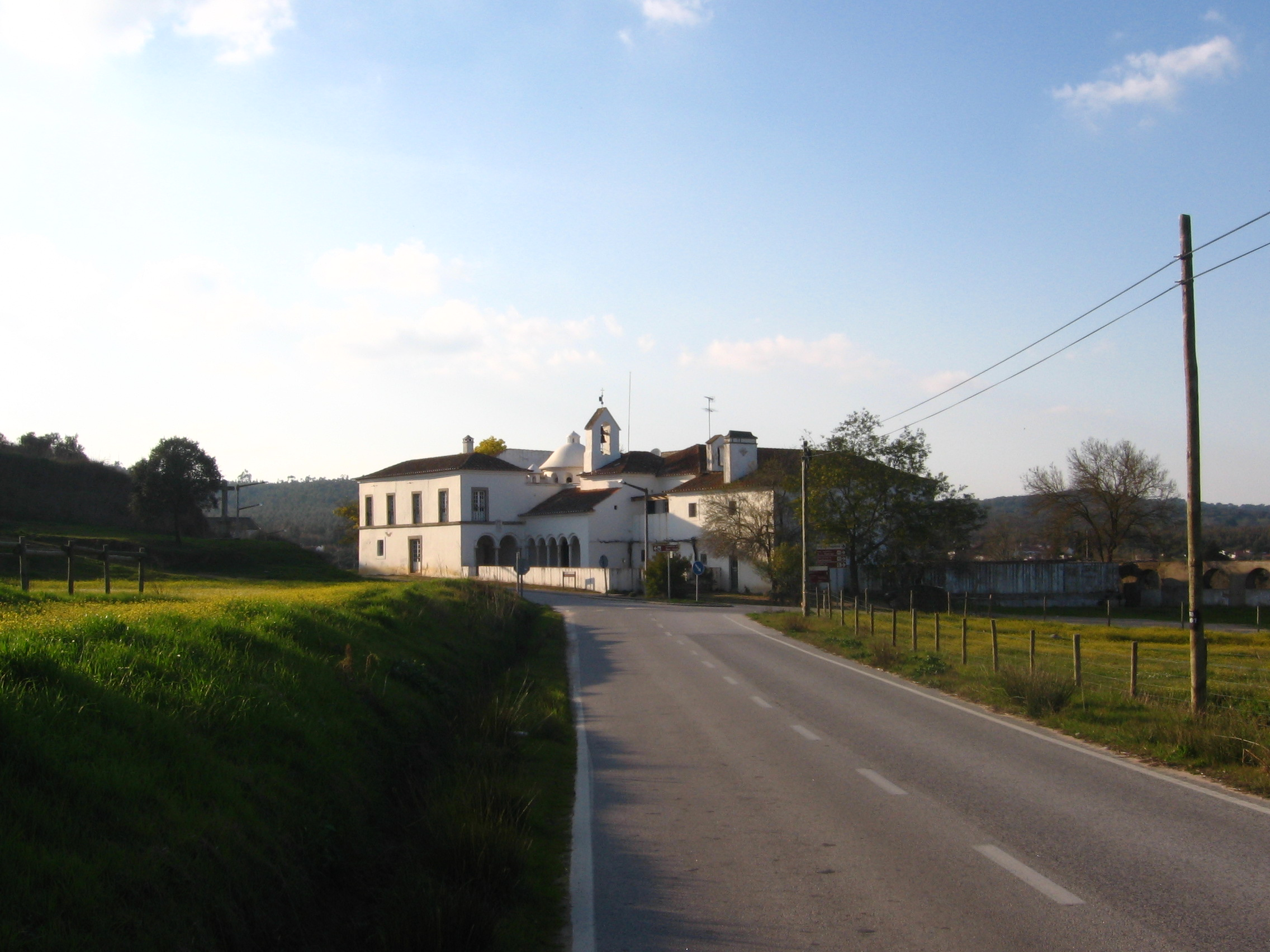
A view of the Convent of Bom Jesus of Valverde, near Quinta do Paço de Valverde

=== Prehistoric ===
- Anta Grande do Zambujeiro, a prehistoric dolmen, excavated near the northern border, considered one of the largest remaining dolmens in the Iberian Peninsula, and excavated in 1958, to the discovery of prehistoric slabs, copper artefacts and ceramics, now on exhibition in the Museum of Évora;
- Antas do Barrocal
- Cromlech of Almendres
- Megalithic monuments of Vale de Rodrigo

=== Archaeological ===
- Roman villa of Tourega

=== Religious ===
- Convent of Bom Jesus de Valverde
