= Roman villa of Tourega =

Roman villa in Évora district, Portugal

- Villa Romana de Tourega
- Villa Romana de Nossa Senhora da Tourega
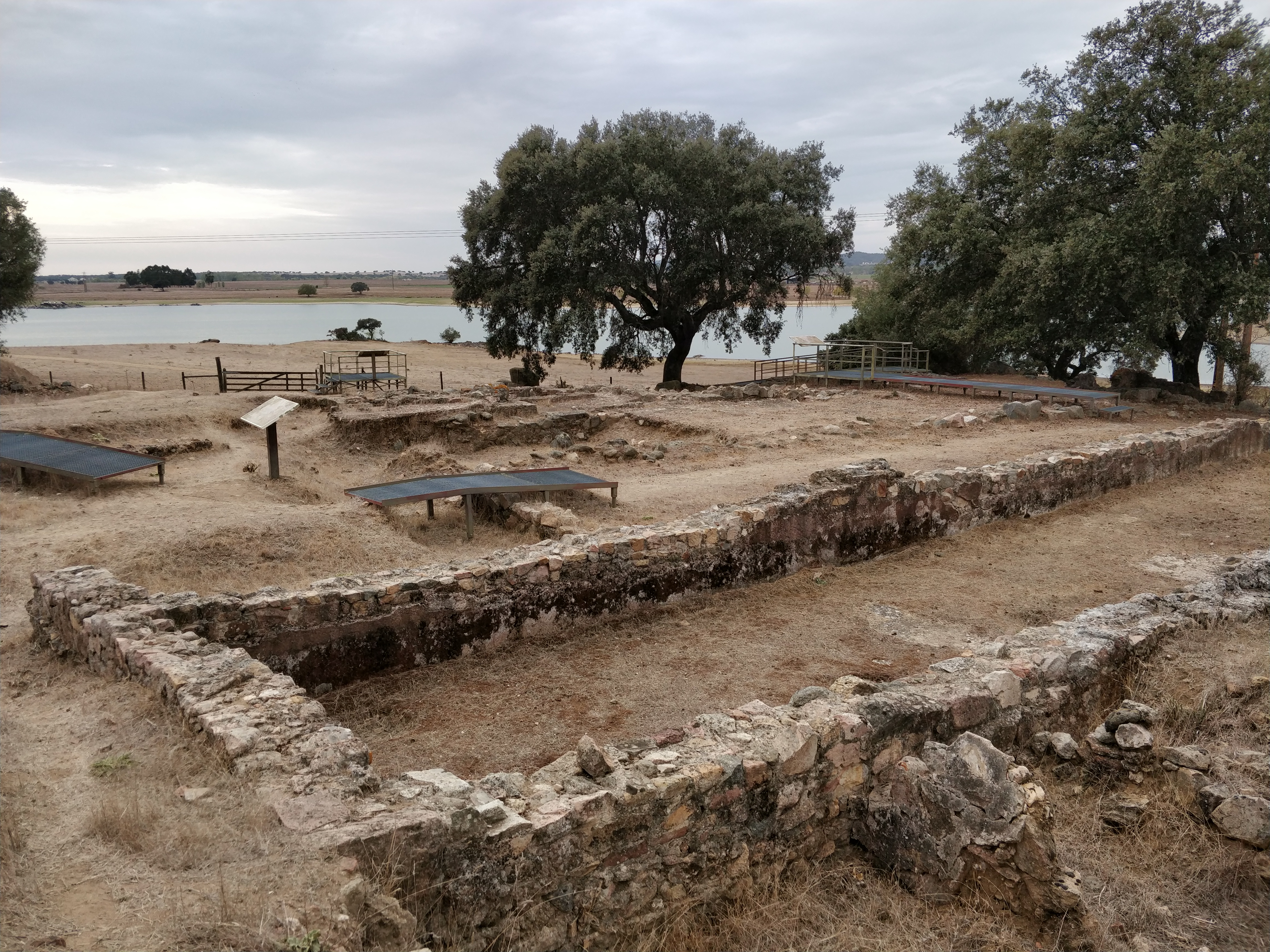
- Interactive map of Roman villa of Tourega
- 38°30′01.2″N 8°01′50.8″W
- Type: Roman

Site notes
- Area: 500 m^{2} (5,400 sq ft)
- Public access: Yes. Request key at farmhouse.

The Roman villa of Tourega is in the parish of Nossa Senhora da Tourega in the Évora District of the Alentejo region of Portugal. During Roman occupation of Portugal it was part of the province of Lusitania, situated a few kilometers to the southwest of Civitas Ebora Liberalitas Julia, the modern-day Evora. It was next to the Roman road to Salacia (present-day Alcácer do Sal) and only five kilometers from the Roman road to Pax Julia, the modern-day Beja. Excavations indicate that it was in use between the mid-first century CE and the end of the fourth century and that, at least in the third century, it belonged to a family of senatorial rank. The Villa, which was primarily used for farming, was classified as a Site of Public Interest in 2012.

Part of the site was excavated between 1985 and 1996 but ground-penetrating radar (GPR) has identified further large areas to the south and west that remain to be excavated. The area excavated so far consists of a large thermal bath with separate facilities for men and women, with hot and cold water, together with the furnaces and heating systems and a large water reservoir. Archaeologists believe that the baths were constructed in three phases. Three main baths have been identified, the largest being 24.5 meters long and about 4.6 meters wide.

Excavations found numerous fragments of terra sigillata or ancient Roman pottery as well as of amphorae. Around 876 fragments of sigillata were discovered. Of those whose origins could be identified, the main source was La Rioja in Spain. Other pottery came from Arezzo in Italy and from La Graufesenque in southern France. There were also many fragments of African red slip ware from unidentified locations in northern Africa. Almost all of the amphorae found had contained fish products and had probably been mainly used for products from the Sado River estuary, such as those produced at Creiro. Fragments of only one or two amphorae that had contained wine or olive oil have been found, suggesting that the villa cultivated its own vines and olive trees.
