= Nossa Senhora da Tourega e Nossa Senhora de Guadalupe =

- Civil parish
- Location in Portugal
- Coordinates: 38.53°N 8.02°W
- Country: Portugal
- Region: Alentejo
- Intermunic. comm.: Alentejo Central
- District: Évora
- Municipality: Évora

Area
  - Total: 263.34 km^{2} (101.68 sq mi)

Population (2011)
  - Total: 1,151
  - Density: 4.4/km^{2} (11/sq mi)
- Time zone: UTC+00:00 (WET)
  - Summer (DST): UTC+01:00 (WEST)

Nossa Senhora da Tourega e Nossa Senhora de Guadalupe is a civil parish in the municipality of Évora, Portugal. It was formed in 2013 by the merger of the former parishes Nossa Senhora da Tourega and Nossa Senhora de Guadalupe. The population in 2011 was 1,151, in an area of 263.34 km^{2}.
