= São Pedro da Afurada =

Former civil parish in Vila Nova de Gaia, Portugal

Coordinates: 41.145°N 8.646°W

Location of São Pedro da Afurada in Vila Nova de Gaia

São Pedro da Afurada (or simply Afurada) is a former civil parish in the municipality of Vila Nova de Gaia, Portugal. In 2013, the parish merged into the new parish Santa Marinha e São Pedro da Afurada. The population in 2011 was 3,568, in an area of 1.00 km².

It is an urban parish in the city of Gaia. Afurada is located near the mouth of the Douro river, where it meets the Atlantic Ocean. It is a traditional fishing village and was created as such. Its patron saint is Saint Peter, hence the name São Pedro, the equivalent in Portuguese.

Afurada's people seem to be very devoted to St. Peter and every year there is a religious holiday in St. Peter's name (on 29 June), where people make processions, pray, and party throughout the night. It is customary for people to eat sardines in that week, baked with the typical Broa de Avintes, a type of corn bread made in the nearby village of Avintes. There is plenty of fireworks too.

During religious processions people carry the images of saints, sometimes in real size, for other people to worship and make offerings to the saints. People usually dress in their traditional fishermen and fisherwomen clothes to pay respect for their patron saint, Peter. Other popular saints include Our Lady the Virgin Mary, Our Lady of Fátima, Our Lady of Carmo, and St. Michael the Archangel, images of which are placed at the centre of the village. However, St. Peter's image is central at this place, the former location of a church in his name that was destroyed in a flood.
