= Great Dolmen of Zambujeiro =

Dolmen in Évora, Portugal

- Interactive map of Great Dolmen of Zambujeiro
- 38°32′21″N 8°0′51″W
- Type: Dolmen
- Location: Évora, Alentejo Central, Alentejo, Portugal

History
- Built: c. 3500 BC

Site notes
- Elevation: 225 m (738 ft)
- Length: 4 m (13 ft)
- Width: 8 m (26 ft)
- Owner: Portugal
- Public access: Private
- Website: Official website

The Great Dolmen of Zambujeiro (Portuguese: Anta Grande do Zambujeiro) is a megalithic monument located in Nossa Senhora da Tourega, near Valverde, in the municipality of Évora, considered one of the biggest such structures in Iberia.

== History ==
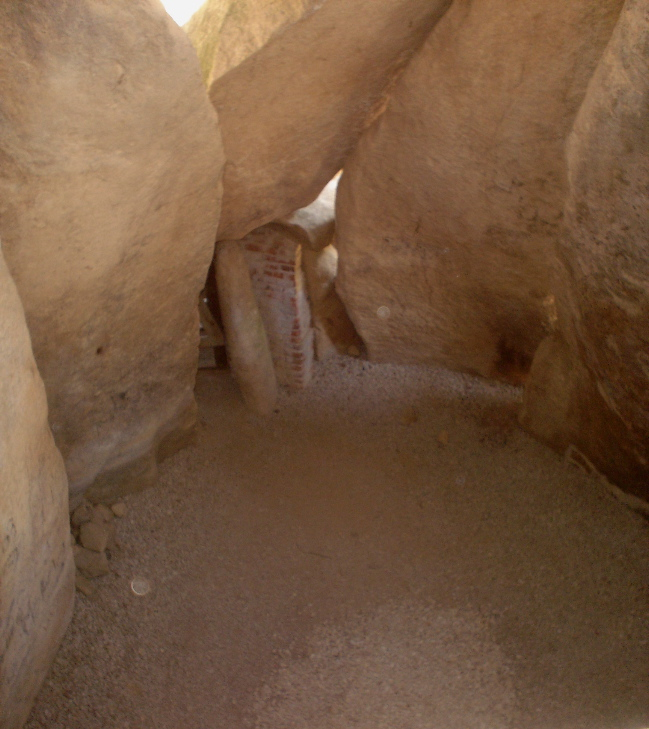
Inside the dolmen

Research has dated this dolmen structure to between 4000-3000 BC, concurrent with the megalithic construction associated with the region of Évora. It is linked to the dolmen culture of the Anta Grande da Comenda da Igreja (Great Dolmen of Comenda da Igreja in the municipality of Montemor-o-Novo.

In 1965, there were archaeological excavations completed by Henrique Leonor Pina, resulting in the discovery of a number of artefacts that were transferred to the museum of Évora. These excavations, which created some controversy (due to techniques used to examine the structure), unearthed slate tablets, necklaces, crosiers, copper objects, ceramics and carinated bowls.

Due to its importance, the Great Dolmen of Zambujeiro (Portuguese: Anta Grande do Zambujeiro) was declared a national monument by the Portuguese government in 1971 (Decree-Law No.516/71, 22 November 1971).

With fears of deterioration of the archaeological site, a metallic enclosure was constructed to protect the site (1983).

A secondary series of excavations were completed between 1989-1990, under the direction of Carlos Tavares da Silva and Joaquina Soares (although there have been no publications on its results).

== Architecture ==
The Great Dolmen is located one kilometre north of the historical Convent of Bom Jesus of Valverde, in the civil parish of Nossa Senhora da Tourega, around Herdade da Mitra (Valverde). This monument illustrates the organizational and technical capabilities of the Neolithic settlements and cultural groups of the period.

Consists of an irregular free-standing plan, composed of a single-chamber, articulated horizontal body with polygonal chamber and rectangular corridor. The funerary chamber and access corridor are covered by size-specific slabs of rock: large granite slabs over the funerary chamber and smaller rock slabs on the entrance corridor.

The principal face, orientated towards the east, is constituted by the projection of the corridor over the chamber face.

The remaining façades are obstructed by the observation mound, which still covers almost the entire structure except for the eastern side. The polygonal chamber, consisting of seven 8 metre-high pillars, is followed by smaller 2 metre-high slabs forming a 12 metre long (1.5 metre wide) corridor. The 7 metre coverage slab (acting as a roof), lies broken on the mound, with a sag on its western edge.

The entrance was marked by a large menhir, decorated with dimples, which is now lying on the ground.

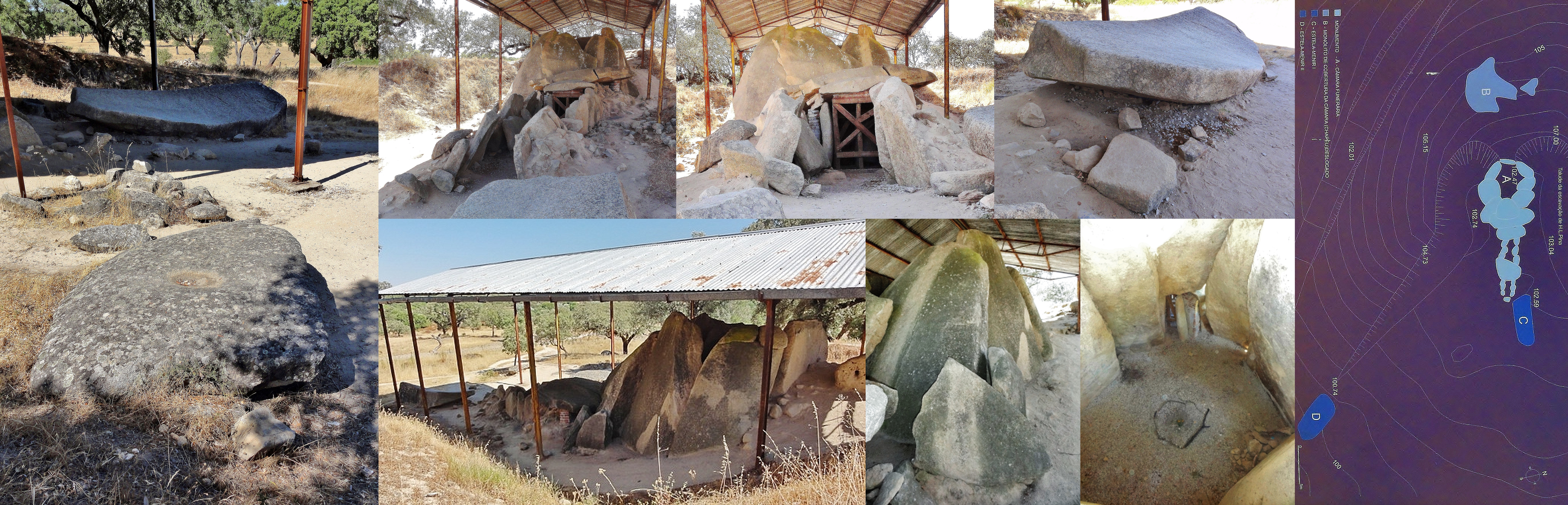
Anta Grande do Zambujeiro (Valverde) Évora, Alentejo, Portugal

== Related links ==
- Almendres Cromlech
- Megalithic
- Neolithic
