= Castro of Chibanes =

Chalcolithic and Roman site in Portugal

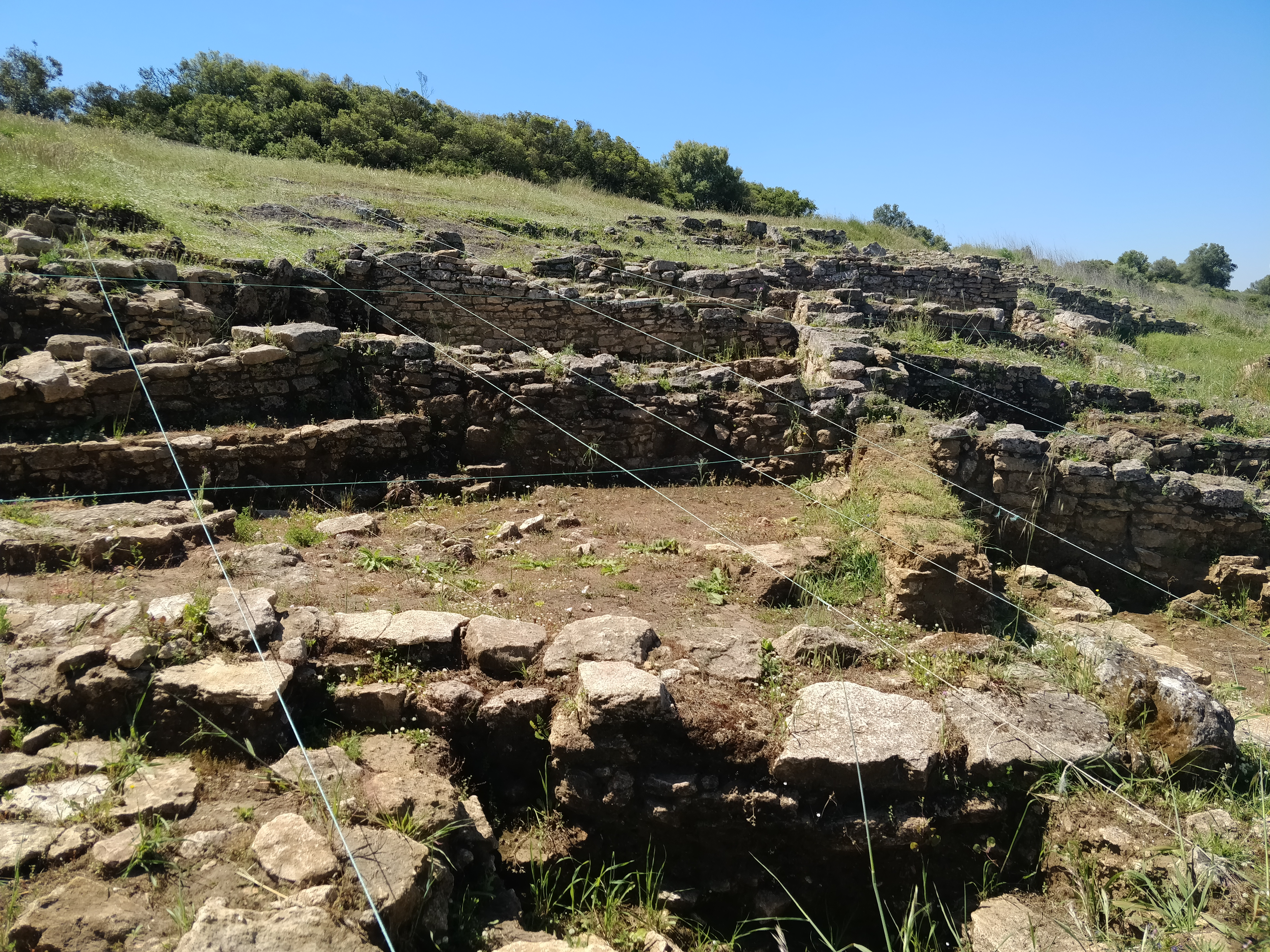
- Interactive map of Castro of Chibanes
- 38°33′50″N 8°55′07″W
- Type: Ancient hill fort
- Periods: Prehistoric, Chalcolithic, Bronze Age, Roman Empire
- Cultures: Beaker
- Location: Palmela, Setúbal District, Portugal

Site notes
- Area: 1 ha (2.5 acres)
- Excavation dates: 1906; 1996-
- Archaeologists: António Inácio Marques da Costa, 1906; Carlos Tavares da Silva and Joaquina Soares, 1996-
- Discovered: 1906
- Public access: Yes

The Castro of Chibanes is located in the Arrábida Nature Park, on the Serra do Louro (Louro Hill), in the municipality of Palmela in the Setúbal District of Portugal, about 25 km (16 mi) south of the capital of Lisbon, which can be seen from the site. The Castro, or hill fort, is located at the top of the hill, naturally defended by a scarp to the south. It covers about one hectare and was first occupied in about 2900 BCE, during the Chalcolithic or Copper Age. It is registered as a Zona Especial de Protecção (a Special Protection Area) and also classified as a Sitio de Interesse Público (Site of Public Interest).

== History ==
The site was identified and first excavated by António Inácio Marques da Costa in 1906. More recently, Carlos Tavares da Silva and Joaquina Soares of the Museu de Arqueologia e Etnografia do Distrito de Setúbal (Museum of Archaeology and Ethnography of Setúbal District—MOADS) have been excavating and studying the site. The geographical location of the Castro is surrounded by good agricultural land and is close to the sea and several rivers, including the River Sado estuary, which was likely an important source of food. The first phase of development took place from the Copper Age until the early Bronze Age (about 2000 BC). The occupants practised agriculture and livestock rearing, although hunting and gathering of molluscs from the nearby sea were also carried out. It is thought that the Castro’s dead were buried in the nearby necropolis known as the Artificial caves of Casal do Pardo. After a period of abandonment of around 1700 years the Chibanes site was again used as a place of residence during the Iron Age (3rd-2nd century BC) and during the Roman occupation of Portugal, when the province of Lusitania formed part of the Roman Empire. It was subsequently the site of an Islamic castle during the 12th century AD during the Almohad period of the Muslim occupation of Portugal, when it was known as Alcaria.

Castro of Chibanes showing surrounding country with River Tagus estuary in the distance

Archaeologists classify the Chalcolithic and Roman occupation into three phases, with some sub-phases:

Phase I

The Chalcolithic and early Bronze Age. Four sub-phases have been identified during the Chalcolithic period.

- Phase 1A1 (2900-2600 cal BC) Early Chalcolithic. Construction of a wall about 300 meters (985 feet) long to defend the north-facing slope. Pottery generally used a fluted decoration, particularly for drinking ware.
- Phase 1A2: (2600–2500 cal BC) Early Chalcolithic II. Collapse of some of the fortified walls and residential areas (probably caused by an earthquake). Beginning of the use of the “acacia leaf” decoration on pottery.
- Phase 1B: (2500–2300 cal BC) Middle Chalcolithic. First copper activities at the site with building of forges for copper smelting. Pottery vessels imprinted with acacia leaf motifs become more common.
- Phase 1C: (2300–1900 cal BC) Late Chalcolithic. Considerable copper production. Two different Bell-Beaker decoration styles co-existing; the local “Palmela style” (dotted, incised geometric decoration) together with the style found elsewhere which usually involved decoration made from impressing twisted cord into the unfired clay. During this period it is believed that the population began to spread to the neighbouring lowland areas.

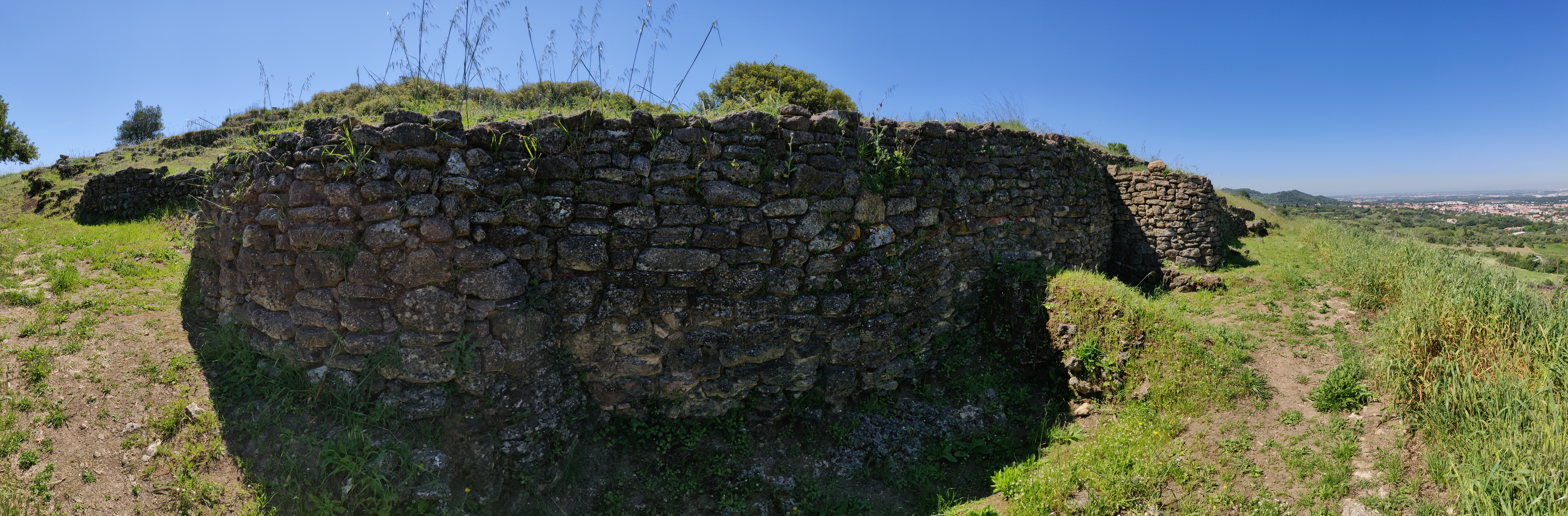
View of wall constructed during Phases I and II

Phase II

- The Iron Age. During the third century BC, a wall was built in the shape of a circular arc and densely packed accommodation built within it. Approximately following the line of the Chalcolithic wall, it was about 300 metres long and included several circular towers.
- Roman Period. During the last quarter of the second century BC and the first quarter of the first century BC a wall was built above part of the wall made in Phase II (A.). It had a maximum thickness of 0.80 metres. Archaeologists believe that the function of this wall was more to delimit the boundaries of the village along the north-facing slope rather than of defence. At the western end were constructed walls to defend against access along the ridge of the Serra do Louro.

Phase III

- Later Roman Period. Construction was carried out in the second quarter and middle of the first century BC. It seems to have mainly involved construction for residential purposes using, in part, some of the existing walls.

== Items found ==
A wide variety of artifacts have been found and these have helped to identify the three distinct phases of occupation. They include chalcolithic pottery, incised bell-breaker pottery, amphoras and painted ceramic bands (from the 2nd period of the Iron Age), and ceramics from the 3rd period of the Iron Age and from the Roman period. Most of the items found are currently deposited in the National Archaeology Museum in Lisbon.

Remains of fauna discovered from the Chalcolithic included bones of the European rabbit (Oryctolagus cuniculus). Butchery marks on the bones suggest the animals were used for food. These were probably hunted rather than being domesticated at that time. Pigs and/or boars probably were already domesticated with evidence suggesting they were killed between 12 and 24 months. They seem to have been the main meat source. A limited number of red deer (Cervus elaphus) bones were discovered, suggesting that hunting of wild game was carried out. Cattle herding appears to have been well-established in the Lisbon area during the Chalcolithic and the discovery of 20 bone fragments suggests this was the case at Chibanes. A total of 73 bone fragments from goat or sheep were also discovered. There is some evidence that they might have been used for milk as well as meat. Bird remains included those of the Northern Gannet (Morus bassanus). A large number of fish bones were also discovered. Finally, a wide variety of different types of molluscs were harvested, dominated by the Grooved carpet shell clam (Ruditapes decussatus).
