= Antas do Barrocal =

Megalithic burial tombs in Évora district, Portugal

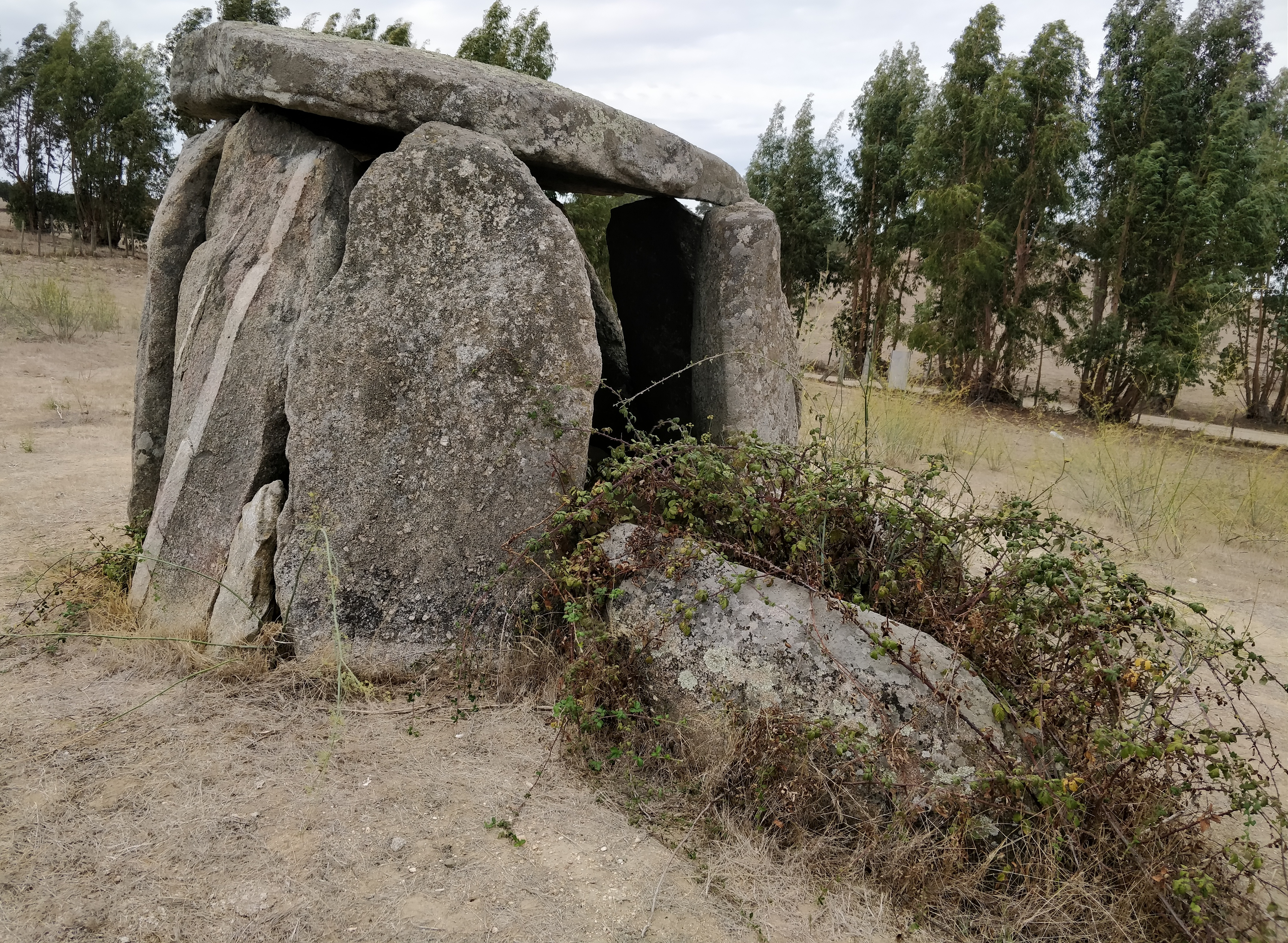
- Anta do Barrocal 1 in 2019
- Interactive map of Antas do Barrocal
- 38°30′28.8″N 8°00′22″W
- Type: Dolmens
- Location: Nossa Senhora da Tourega, Évora, Portugal

History
- Built: c. 3000 BC

Site notes
- Material: Stone
- Height: 2.2 m (7 ft 3 in)
- Diameter: 3 m (9.8 ft)
- Condition: Good
- Public access: Anta 1 only

The Antas do Barrocal, also known as the Antas Herdade do Barrocal, are a set Neolithic dolmens, or megalithic funeral chambers, at Monte do Barrocal, in the parish of Nossa Senhora da Tourega, in the Évora District of the Alentejo region of Portugal. They are in an area with a high concentration of megalithic sites. Nine have been identified but only two (Numbers 1 and 2) are more than remnants and only Number 1 can be visited. This has been classified as a National Monument since 1910.

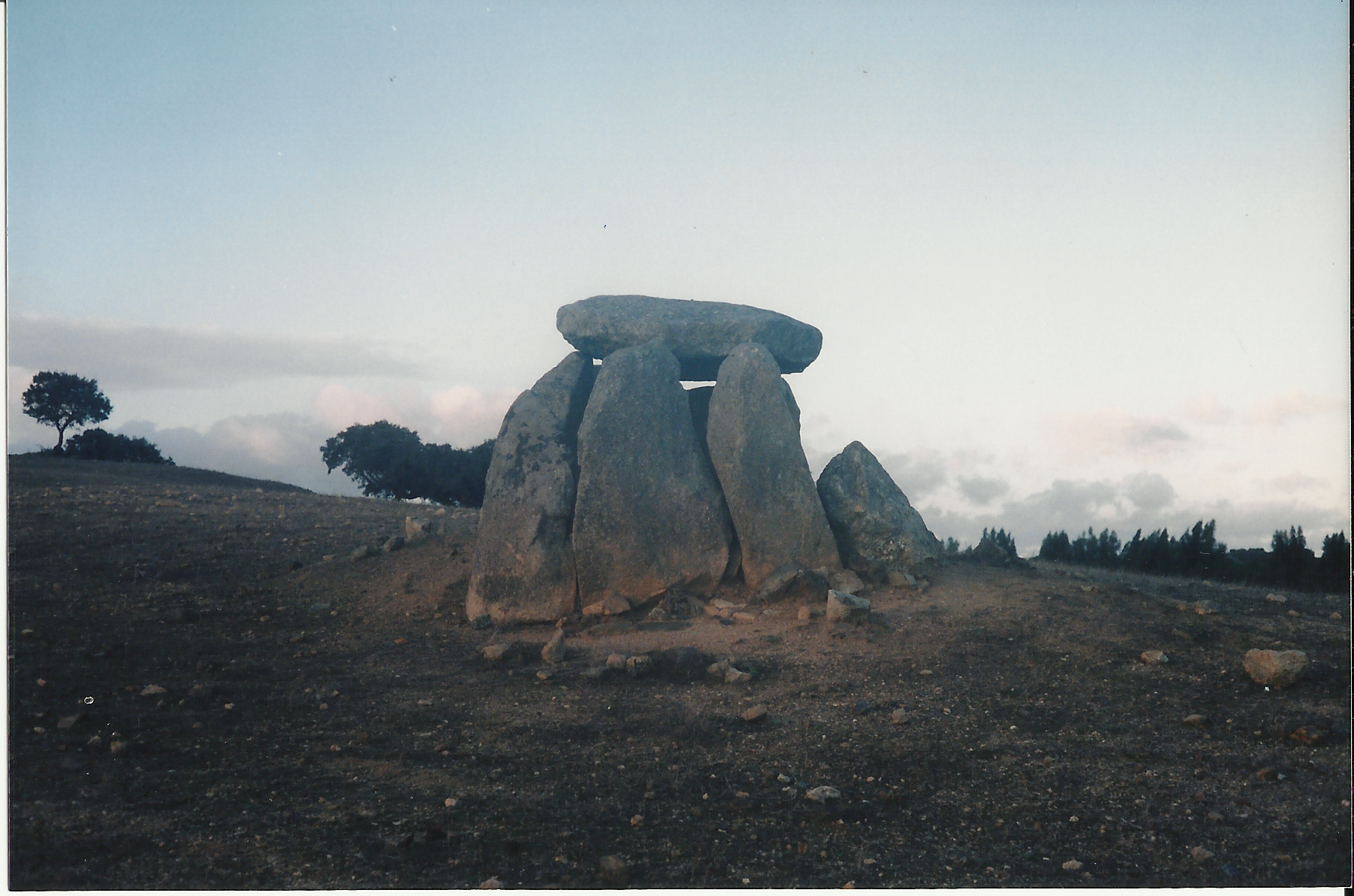
Anta do Barrocal 2 in 1999

Anta do Barrocal 1 was constructed between the beginning of the fourth and the middle of the third millennium BC. It is a dolmen built with seven coarse-grained granite pillars (of which five are in the original position) that are just over 2 meters high and create a polygonal burial chamber with a diameter of about three meters, which is covered by an almost intact capstone. There is an access chamber, although this has been destroyed and only two broken stones remain. There are no remains of the tumulus that is likely to have covered the chamber. The dolmen is oriented east-west.

The two dolmens were restored in the 1970s. Anta do Barrocal 2 is one hundred meters west of Anta 1 on private land with no access. It was originally essentially identical to Anta 1. Its capstone is no longer in place, having fallen off quite recently.
