= Melides =

- Civil parish
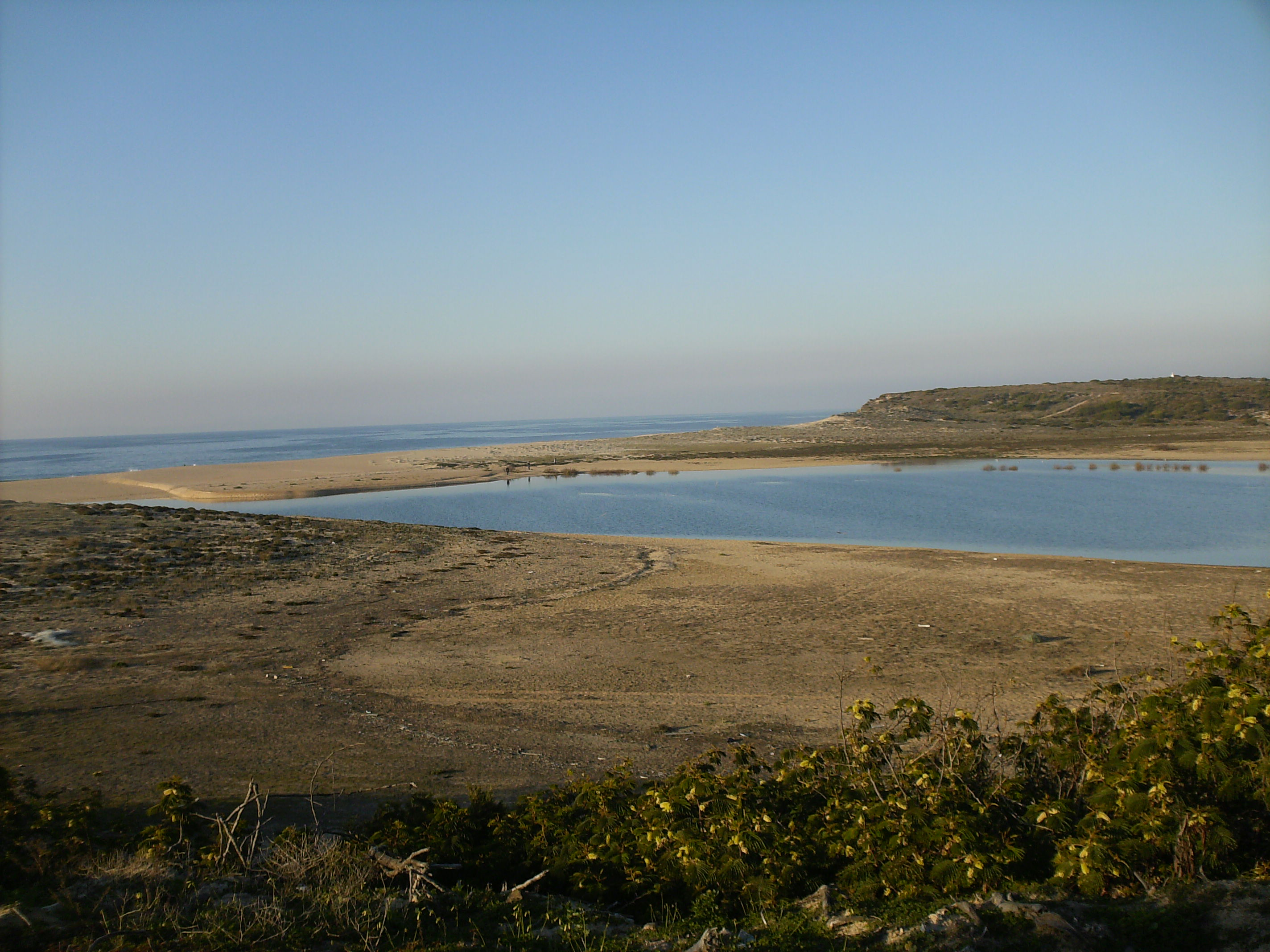
- Lagoon and beach

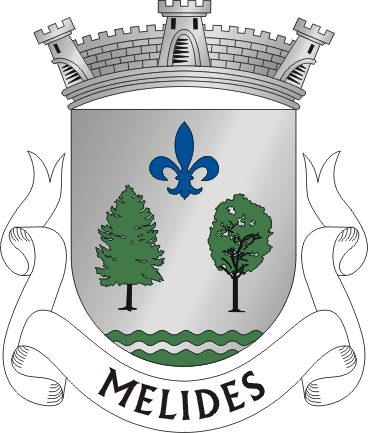
- Flag

- Location in Portugal
- Coordinates: 38°10′N 8°44′W
- Country: Portugal
- Region: Alentejo
- District: Setúbal

Area
  - Total: 155.2 km^{2} (59.9 sq mi)

Population (2021)
  - Total: 1,459
  - Density: 9.401/km^{2} (24.35/sq mi)
- Time zone: UTC+00:00 (WET)
  - Summer (DST): UTC+01:00 (WEST)

Melides (pronounced [mɨˈliðɨʃ], locally [mɫidʒ̊]) is a parish in the Grândola municipality in the Setúbal District of Portugal. It has an area of 155.2 km^{2} and had 1,459 inhabitants as of the census of 2021. The agricultural parish borders the Atlantic Ocean and has become a popular area for summer homes. The village is located directly east of the Melides lagoon and its floodplain and its surrounding landscape includes forests of eucalyptus, pine and cork.

== History ==
Human occupation of the area dates from the Neolithic era. The Dolmen of Pedra Branca is a megalithic burial tomb from around 2500 BCE, while the Necrópole de Cistas das Casas Velhas is a Bronze Age necropolis; both can be visited.

The village is thought to date from the end of the 15th century, when a parish was created in the church of St. Marinha. It is believed to have been formed by the gradual concentration of houses of fishermen and farmers who lived in the vicinity.

The village possessed a small fishing port, but during the second half of the 16th century, silting closed off the lagoon's exit to the sea. Subsequently, the village's activity turned progressively towards agriculture and the production of pottery and cork products.

On 23 January 1626, the Schoonhoven owned by the Dutch East India Company sank off the coast of Melides. Ship remains that may be of the Schoonhoven were found by divers inside the Melides lagoon, and exposed in the sand bank following heavy rainfall in February 2021.

In the 18th century, St. Peter's church in Melides was built in the location of an existing shrine to St. Peter. This replaced the church of Santa Marinha, which was located outside of the old village's center.

In 1870, Melides became part of the municipality of Santiago do Cacém. In 1895, it returned to being part of the Grândola municipality.

== Present day ==
During the summer, the beaches in Melides attract tourists, contributing to the village's economy. There are a large number of summer houses near the beach, in the village and the surrounding hills. In the parish, there is a luxury resort, with a golf course, as well as two large campsites. In the village, there is a small market hall where fresh fish is sold.

Rice is cultivated in the floodplain of the Melides lagoon and each year, around one thousand tonnes of rice are harvested. In recent years, the region has experienced water scarcity challenging rice farming in Melides. A project called Intertidal Melides aims to lower the water and fertilizer use in rice farming and to improve water availability by managing the water resources from source to sea.

Every year, a path is excavated between the lagoon and the Atlantic Ocean by the administration of Alentejo's hydrographic region. This water exchange is necessary to maintain the ecological and nutritional balance of the Melides lagoon.

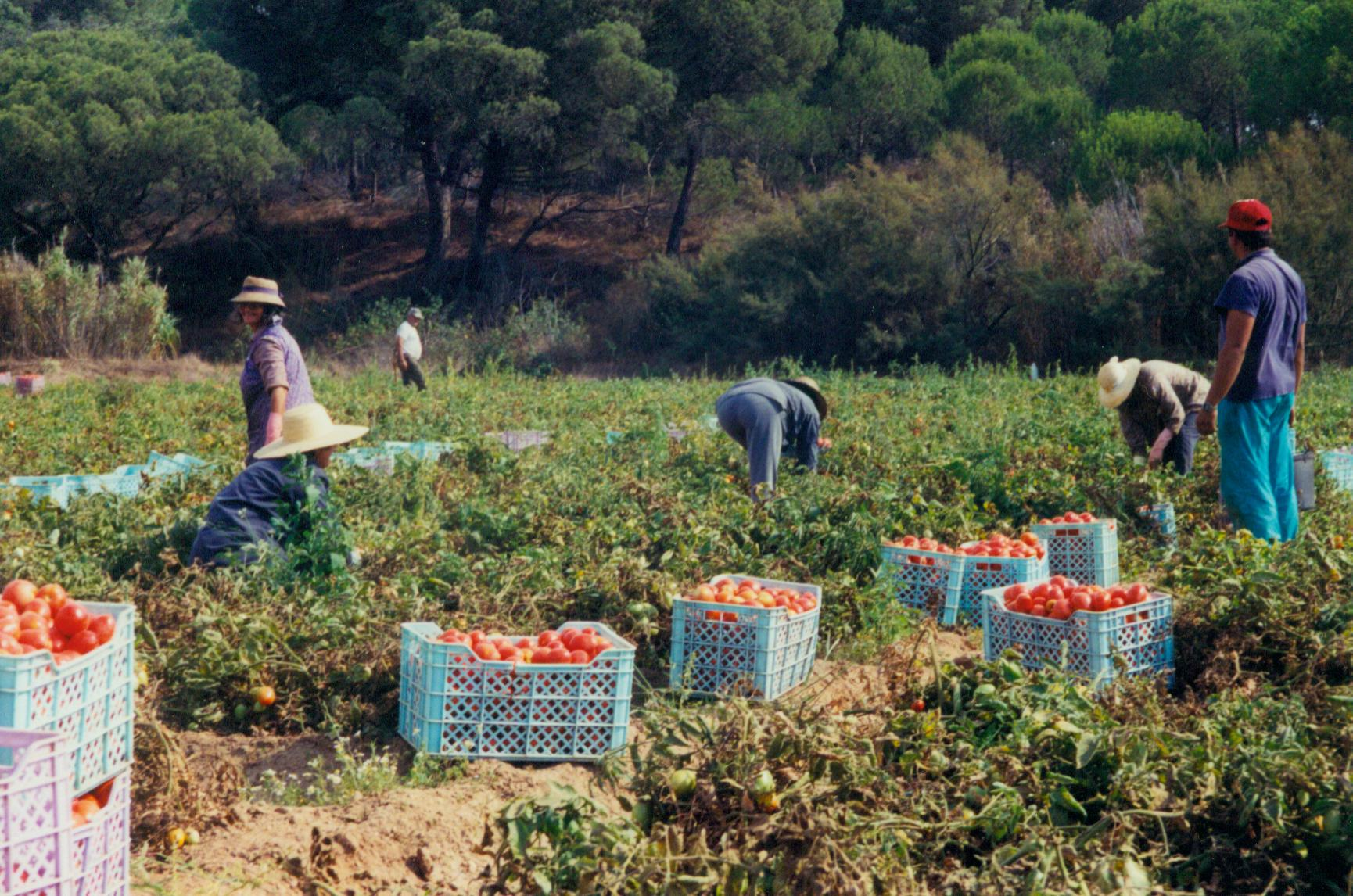
Melides is known for its tomato production

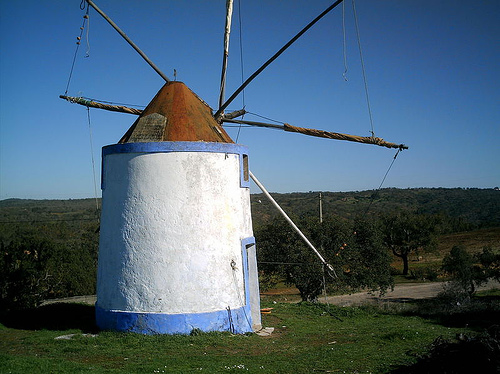
Windmill in Melides

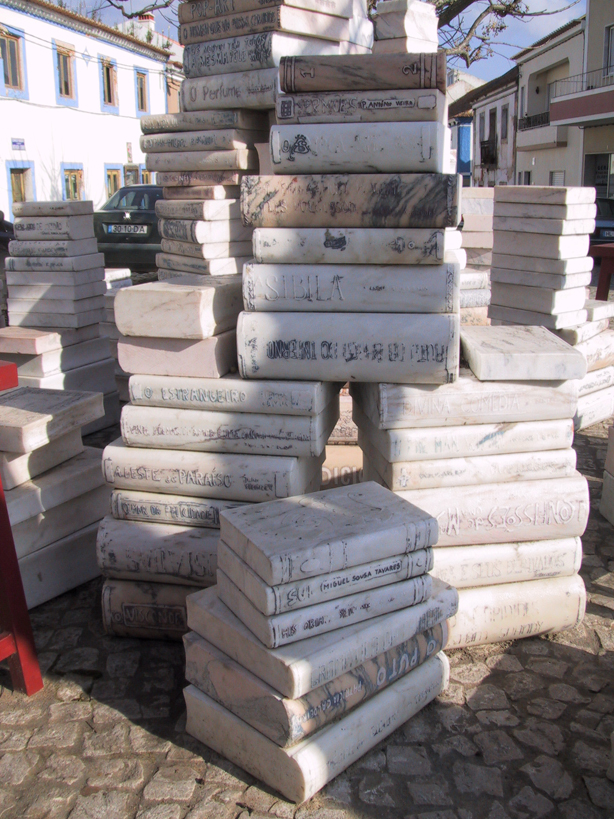
Monument of books in marble
