= Dolmen of Pedra Branca =

Megalithic site near Melides, Portugal

- Dolmen da Pedra Branca (Portuguese)
- Monumento Megalítico da Pedra Branca
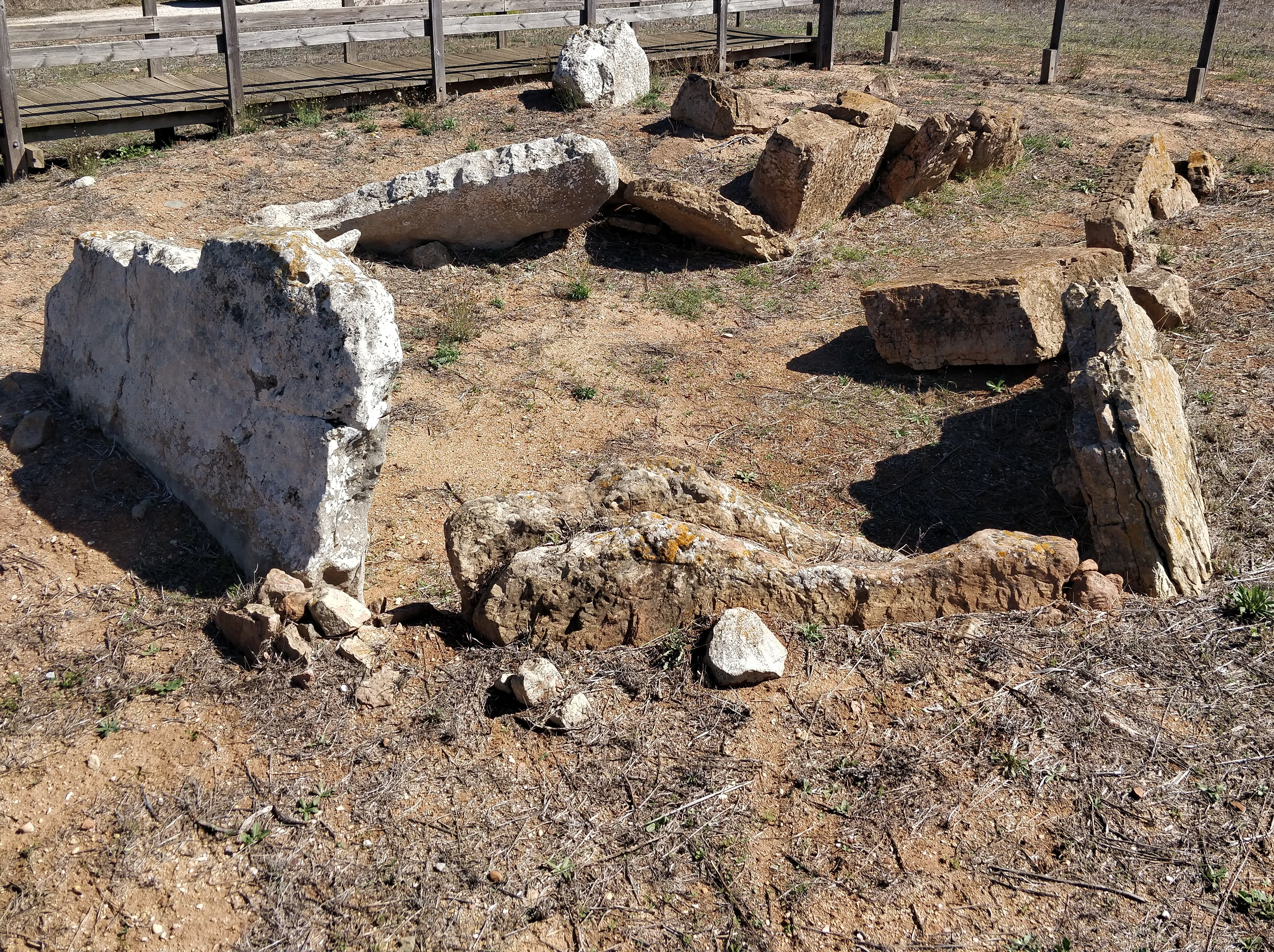
- The tomb in 2023

- Location in Portugal
- 38°06′47″N 8°43′27″W
- Type: Tomb
- Cultures: 1. Almeri; 2. Campaniform Vase Culture
- Location: Melides, Setubal, Portugal

History
- Built: c. 2500 - c. 2000 BC

Site notes
- Excavation dates: 1972 and 1975
- Archaeologists: O. da Veiga Ferreira
- Owner: Public
- Public access: Yes
- Property of Public Interest, Decree nº 29/90, DR, 1st series, nº 163 of 17 July 1990

The Dolmen of Pedra Branca is a burial tomb, used in the late Neolithic and, subsequently, in the late Chalcolithic periods. It is situated in the Vale de Figueira in the parish of Melides, which is in the Grândola municipality of Setubal.

== Description ==
The burial chamber's roof (in stone or wooden slabs) was supported in the middle by a large, 2.2 meter tall, quartzite pillar, which had the structural function of sharing the weight of the crypt's roof with the other supports. The main polygonal chamber, measuring 3.85 m x 3.4 m, reached by an entrance corridor, was covered by transverse slabs. A trapezoidal chamber on the left side was a separate compartment, measuring 3.5m x 1.5m. Apart from the quartzite pillar, other materials used were sandstone and limestone. In addition to skeletons, many funerary offerings have been discovered. The dolmen is situated high on a hill that visually dominates the surrounding Vale de Figueira area.

The lower level of the tomb dates from 2500 BC in the late Neolithic and contained most of the funerary offerings, including an archer's armband, arrowheads, blades, beads, engraved schist plaques, idols, cups, and vases. The upper level from around 2000 BC in the late Chalcolithic, contained bell-shaped vases, among other artifacts. Dates have been verified by carbon dating.

== Excavation ==
Discovered by L. Trindade and A Rodrigues of the Geological Service of Portugal, the excavation was carried out by O. da Veiga Ferreira and collaborators in 1972 and 1975.
