= Santa Marinha e São Pedro da Afurada =

- Civil parish
- Location in Portugal
- Coordinates: 41.13°N 8.62°W
- Country: Portugal
- Region: Norte
- Metropolitan area: Porto
- District: Porto
- Municipality: Vila Nova de Gaia

Area
  - Total: 6.91 km^{2} (2.67 sq mi)

Population (2011)
  - Total: 33,714
  - Density: 4,900/km^{2} (13,000/sq mi)
- Time zone: UTC+00:00 (WET)
  - Summer (DST): UTC+01:00 (WEST)

Santa Marinha e São Pedro da Afurada is a civil parish in the municipality of Vila Nova de Gaia, Portugal. It was formed in 2013 by the merger of the former parishes Santa Marinha and São Pedro da Afurada. The population in 2011 was 33,714, in an area of 6.91 km². It contains the city centre of Vila Nova de Gaia.
