= Artificial caves of Alapraia =

Prehistoric necropolis near Lisbon, Portugal

- Grutas Artificiais de Alapraia
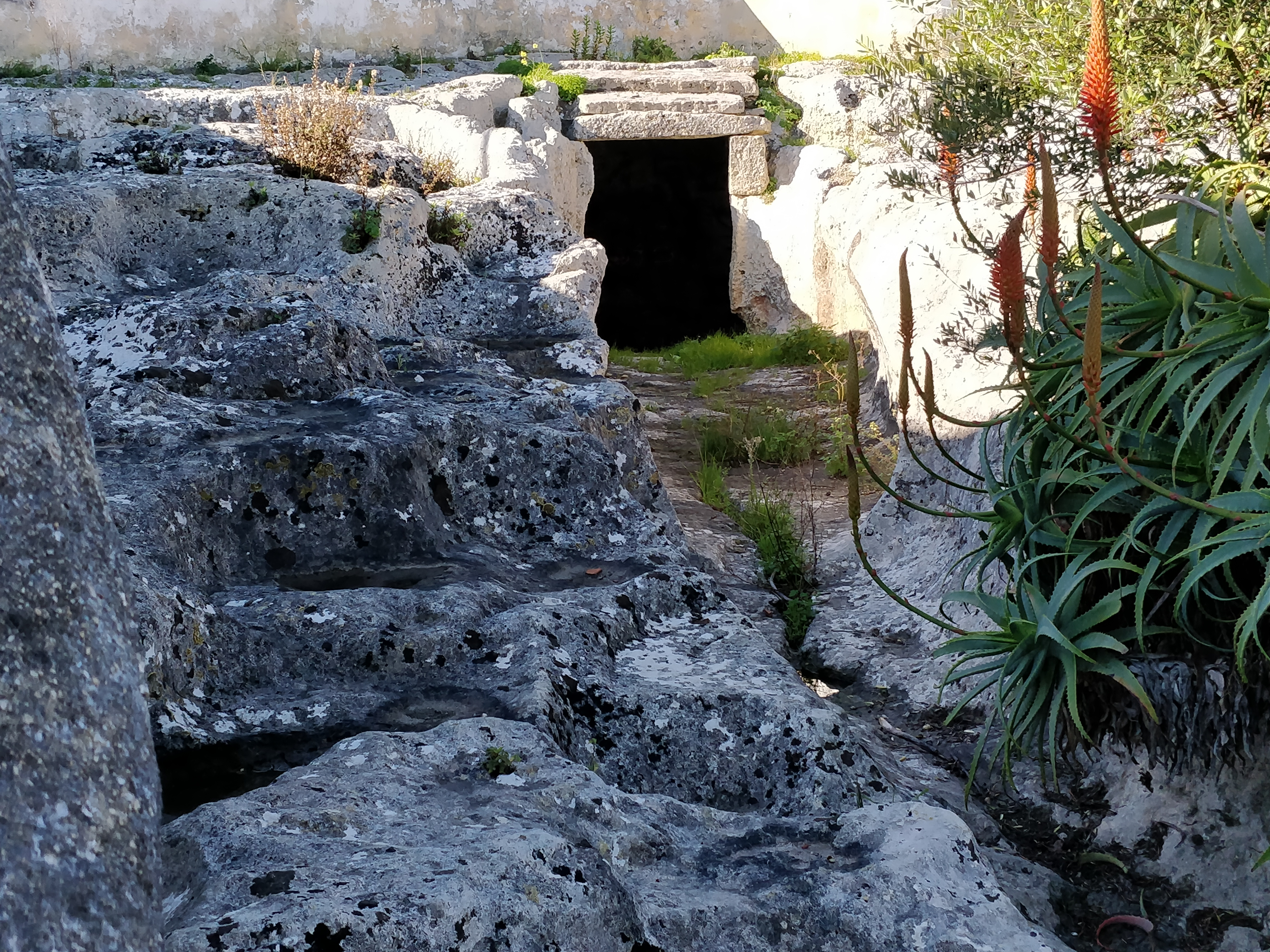
- Interactive map of Artificial caves of Alapraia
- 38°42′23″N 9°22′38″W
- Type: Necropolis
- Periods: Prehistoric; Chalcolithic; Bronze Age
- Location: Estoril, Lisbon District, Portugal

Site notes
- Excavation dates: 1889; 1932; 1942–43
- Archaeologists: F. de Paula e Oliveira, 1889; Father Eugénio Jalhay and Lieutenant Colonel Afonso do Paço, 1932 and 1942–43
- Discovered: 1889
- Public access: Outside only

The Artificial caves of Alapraia (Portuguese: Grutas Artificiais de Alapraia) constitute a prehistoric necropolis formed by four subterranean tombs or hypogea that were created by excavating marlstone rock using stone tools. They are situated in the centre of the suburb of Alapraia in Estoril, Lisbon District, Portugal and are believed to date back to the last quarter of the 4th Millennium BCE and to have been used as a necropolis for over one thousand years.

== Caves ==
The four caves are surrounded by and, in some cases, are underneath modern housing and are individually numbered, according to the date of excavation. They are identified at the site but cannot be accessed by casual visitors. All the caves had the same system of construction, consisting of a long corridor or vestibule for access, with a circular chamber at the end with a skylight at the top, protected by slabs. This is believed to have made possible the placement of bodies into the chamber, when occupancy levels no longer allowed access through the corridor. Cave 1 is 19 m long and was first described by the geologist F. de Paula e Oliveira in 1889. A spherical chamber has a diameter of 6.2 metres and a height of 2.8 metres in the middle. It is the largest of the four caves and at the time of the excavation had been used as a stable or pigsty and wood store. It is surrounded by a high wall. Caves 2-4 were excavated by Father Eugénio Jalhay and Lieutenant Colonel Afonso do Paço. Cave 2 has a total length of 9 metres, with the oval chamber having a diameter of 4.2-4.4 metres and a height in the middle of 2.2 metres. It was excavated in 1932. Cave 3 has a diameter of 6.20 metres and a mean height of 2.40 metres and was excavated in 1942. The fourth cave was discovered during work to install a fountain. It was excavated in 1943 and is about 11 metres long, with a slightly oval chamber of 4.35 metres diameter and a height in the middle of 2.4 metres.

The excavations provided many finds dating back to the Beaker culture of the second half of the 3rd millennium BCE, together with older pottery from the Chalcolithic (Copper Age) era and more recent Bronze Age findings. Items found included decorated ceramic vessels, such as bowls and cups, shale plates with a geometric pattern, polished bone items, flints, pearls, votive idols, and limestone replicas of two soles of sandals, which are believed to be unique. The finds are mainly located in the Condes de Castro Guimarães Museum in neighbouring Cascais, where an archaeology room was inaugurated to display them in 1942.
