= Baixa da Banheira e Vale da Amoreira =

- Civil parish
- Location in Portugal
- Coordinates: 38.660°N 9.045°W
- Country: Portugal
- Region: Lisbon
- Metropolitan area: Lisbon
- District: Setúbal
- Municipality: Moita

Area
  - Total: 6.42 km^{2} (2.48 sq mi)

Population (2011)
  - Total: 30,949
  - Density: 4,820/km^{2} (12,500/sq mi)
- Time zone: UTC+00:00 (WET)
  - Summer (DST): UTC+01:00 (WEST)

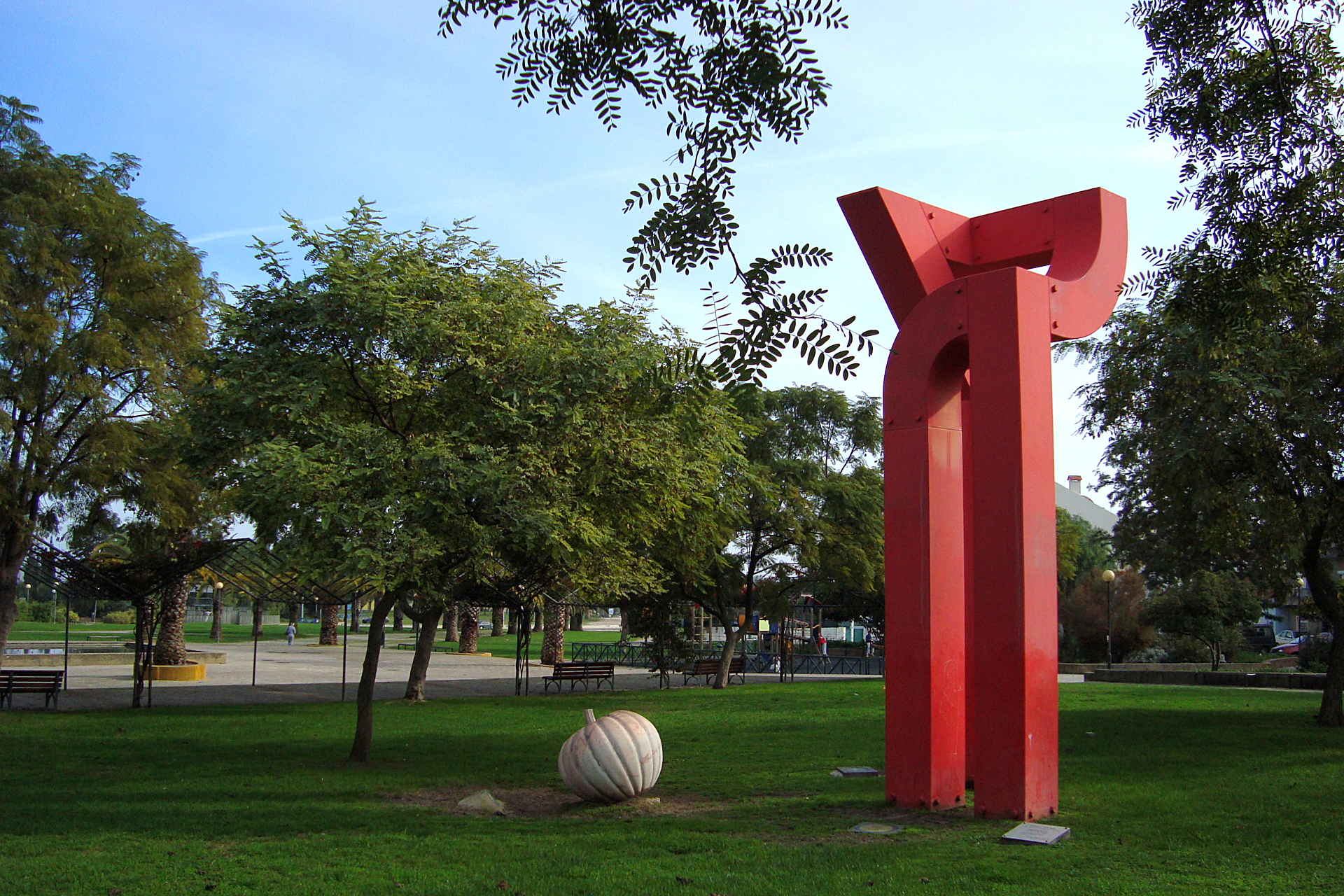
Garden in Baixa da Banheira, municipality of Moita, Portugal.

Baixa da Banheira e Vale da Amoreira is a civil parish in the municipality of Moita, Portugal. It was formed in 2013 by the merger of the former parishes Baixa da Banheira and Vale da Amoreira. The population in 2011 was 30,949, in an area of 6.42 km^{2}.
