= Alejandro Laguna =

Professional dancer and researcher of performative arts

Alejandro César Grosso Laguna
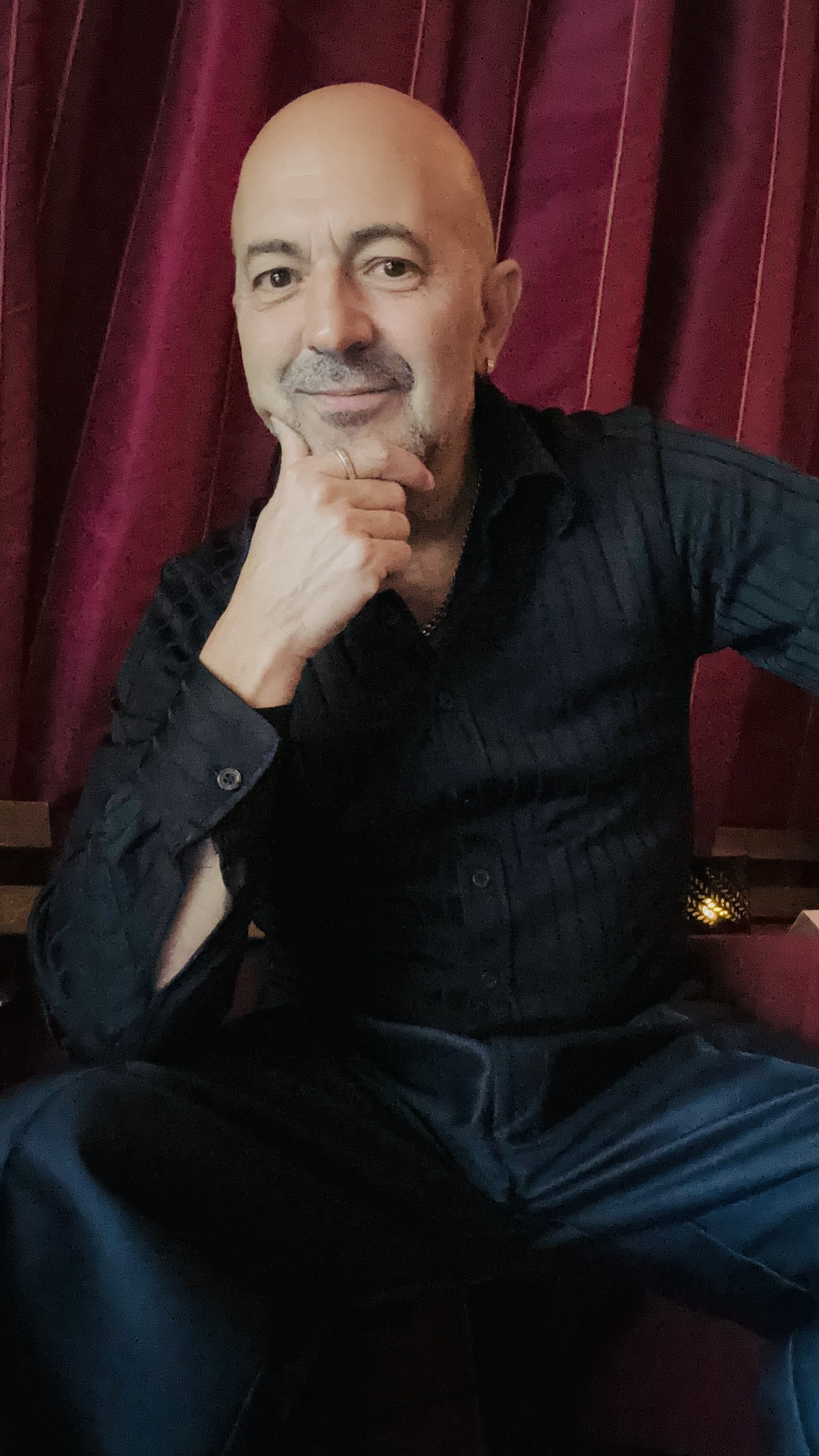
- Born: Ciudad de Buenos Aires, Argentina
- Citizenship: Argentina and Portugal
- Occupations: Researcher and professional dancer
- Children: 1
- Relatives: Fernanda Laguna (sister)

Alejandro Laguna (born Ciudad de Buenos Aires, Argentina) is a practitioner-researcher and professional tango dancer based in Lisbon, Portugal. His research focuses on visual and sound gestures in dance education and multimodal microanalysis. He is best known for his research and practice on the connections between tango dance and fado music.

== Education ==
Laguna has a degree in music from the Argentine National Music Conservatory and studied music at the Faculty of Arts, National University of La Plata (1985–1990). He holds a degree in Music Education (2007) and a PhD in Theatre Studies (Performative Arts) from the University of Évora (2013). He started learning tango in 1996 with Carlos Borquez and Inés Prancevic (Los Borquez) and Aurora Lubiz and later trained with Ana María Schapira, Milena Plebs, Alfredo Alonso and Silvia Mucci (Los Alonso), and Graciela González. He has received advanced training in Gyrotonic and Ballet Technique from Barbora Hruskova, former principal dancer with the National Ballet of Portugal.

== Career ==
From 1999 to 2015 he was a teaching assistant at the Superior Dance School of Lisbon. He has also been a visiting professor at the Faculty of Human Kinetics - Dance Department University of Lisbon and Centro de Estudios para el Arte y la Cultura, Universidad Autónoma de Chiapas (Mexico).

In 2007 he began his doctoral studies at University of Évora with a scholarship from the Foundation for Science and Technology of Portugal. He was an awarded a PhD in 2013 with a thesis titled "Revision of communication problems in the context of technical dance classes from the perspective of the dance musician". He is the author of over 40 peer-reviewed academic journal articles and conference papers on dance communication, dance pedagogy, and the biomechanics of Tango.

Since 2013 he has been a researcher at the Laboratory for the Study of Musical Experience (LEEM-UNLP - Argentina) - Faculty of Arts, National University of La Plata, Argentina. From 2015 to 2022 he was a postdoctoral researcher in the Departamento de Comunicação e Arte, Universidade de Aveiro (Portugal) and the Laboratory for the Study of Musical Experience (LEEM-UNLP-Argentina), with funding from the Portuguese Foundation for Science and Technology for a project on "Communication aspects in multimodal expressive performance: Crossing propositional and non-propositional contents".

In 1998 Laguna began organizing the first weekly milonga in Campo de Ourique, Lisbon. In 1999, he founded the Milonga d'A Barraca, Portugal's longest running milonga. It is held every Sunday at Teatro A Barraca Bar, an Art Deco building which is recognised as a cultural asset by the Municipal Chamber of Lisbon, and is home to a theatre company directed by Maria Do Céu Guerra and Hélder Costa.

Since 1999, Laguna has promoted encounters between tango dance and fado music. This began by playing a round of fado songs during his weekly milonga. Although fado music is not traditionally danced, Laguna recognized how Portuguese dance couples were able to express themselves corporally using the steps and embrace of tango. Portuguese dancers reported that they were able to express the poetry and music of fado in a way that was not possible with the lyrics of tango. This led Laguna to deepen the connection between fado and tango by regularly inviting renowned fado artists to perform live at the Milonga d'A Barraca. These musicians spoke of "the pleasant feeling of playing while watching the dance and listening to the rhythmic shuffling of the feet". An important element of this encounter was the replication of the dark lighting and traditional ambience of fado houses "which asks for absolute silence, mysterious gloom, and a certain dose of sadness in the heart".

Approximately 80 fado artists have performed at Milonga d'A Barraca, including

- Celeste Rodrigues
- Katia Guerreiro
- Helder Moutinho
- António Chainho
- Fernando Alvim
- Luís Guerreiro
- Carlos Manuel Proença
- Pedro de Castro
- Maria Amélia Proença

Alejandro Laguna also explored the connections between fado and tango more deeply through his own dance practice. In 2001 he was invited to dance tango to fado music played by the master of Portuguese guitar, António Chainho, at the Prémio Bordalo awards ceremony. This televised event took place in the Grand Auditorium of Culturgest. This led to a series of collaborations between Alejandro Laguna and António Chainho, together with the singer Marta Dias, in Portugal and Spain. According to António Chainho, such joint fado and tango performances had never been seen before. Portuguese musicologist, Orlando Sousa, analyzed the relationship between tango and fado, and identified the collaboration between Laguna, Chainho, and Dias as the first attempt to fuse these two genres. According to Laguna and his collaborators, the trajectories, history and feelings of fado and tango are similar and somewhat complementary because both were born in marginal, port environments.

In 2023 Laguna launched the research project "Collaborative Artistic Reconfiguration of the Tango Dance towards Fado", with the aim of deepening understanding about the natural connections between these art forms. His principal collaborator is the Brazilian dancer Camila Delphim, with whom he reconfigures tango movements to align with the "expressive musical characteristics of Fado". In 2024, they were semi-finalists in Got Talent Portugal.
