= Roman ruins of Creiro =

Roman Empire fish-processing factory near Setúbal, Portugal

- Estação Arqueológica do Creiro
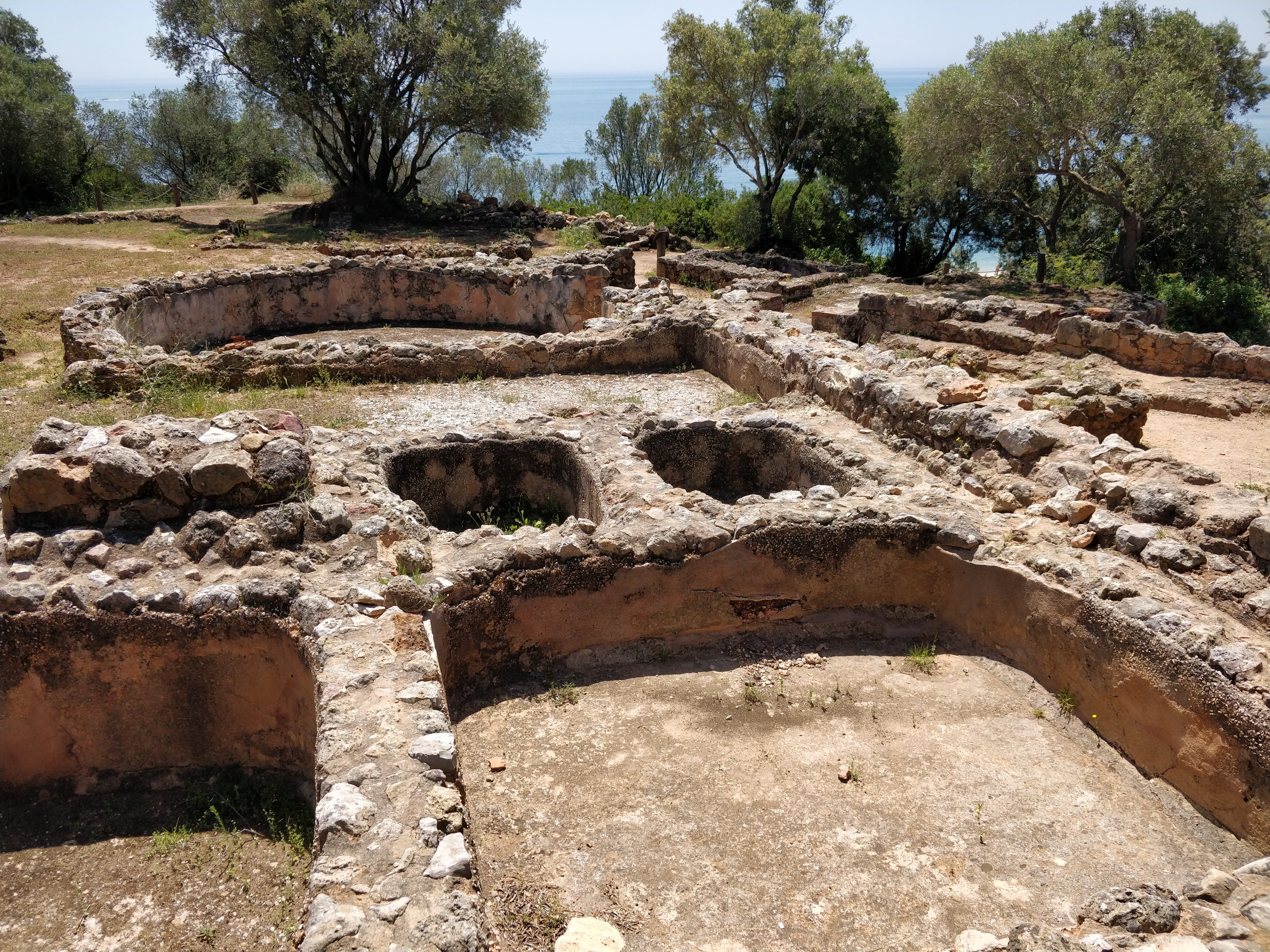
- Interactive map of Roman ruins of Creiro
- 38°28′53″N 8°58′36″W
- Type: Ruins from the Roman Empire
- Location: Serra de Arrábida, Setúbal District, Portugal

Site notes
- Excavation dates: 1987
- Archaeologists: Carlos Tavares da Silva
- Discovered: 1907
- Condition: Fair
- Public access: Yes

The Roman ruins of Creiro are situated in the Arrábida Natural Park above Creiro Beach in the Setúbal District of Portugal. They are ruins of a fish-salting factory and Roman baths, dating back to the days when the province of Lusitania formed part of the Roman Empire.

== History ==
In Roman times, the richness of fish and salt in the estuary of the Sado River led to the creation of salted-fish industries centred on the towns of Cetóbriga (now Setúbal) and Tróia. The factory at Creiro was one of the smaller but older production units for salted and pickled fish and fish sauces that were exported throughout the Empire in specially designed amphorae. The Setúbal area was the Roman Empire’s most important area for fish product processing.

The ruins were first identified by the archaeologist António Inácio Marques da Costa in 1907. However, he provided no detailed information about the site and it was not until 1964 when his unpublished manuscripts were discovered that the nature of the site was officially known. It was only in 1987 that the first archaeological excavation was carried out, by the Museum of Archaeology and Ethnology of Setúbal District (Museu de Arqueologia e Etnografia do Distrito de Setúbal (MAEDS)), led by Carlos Tavares da Silva.

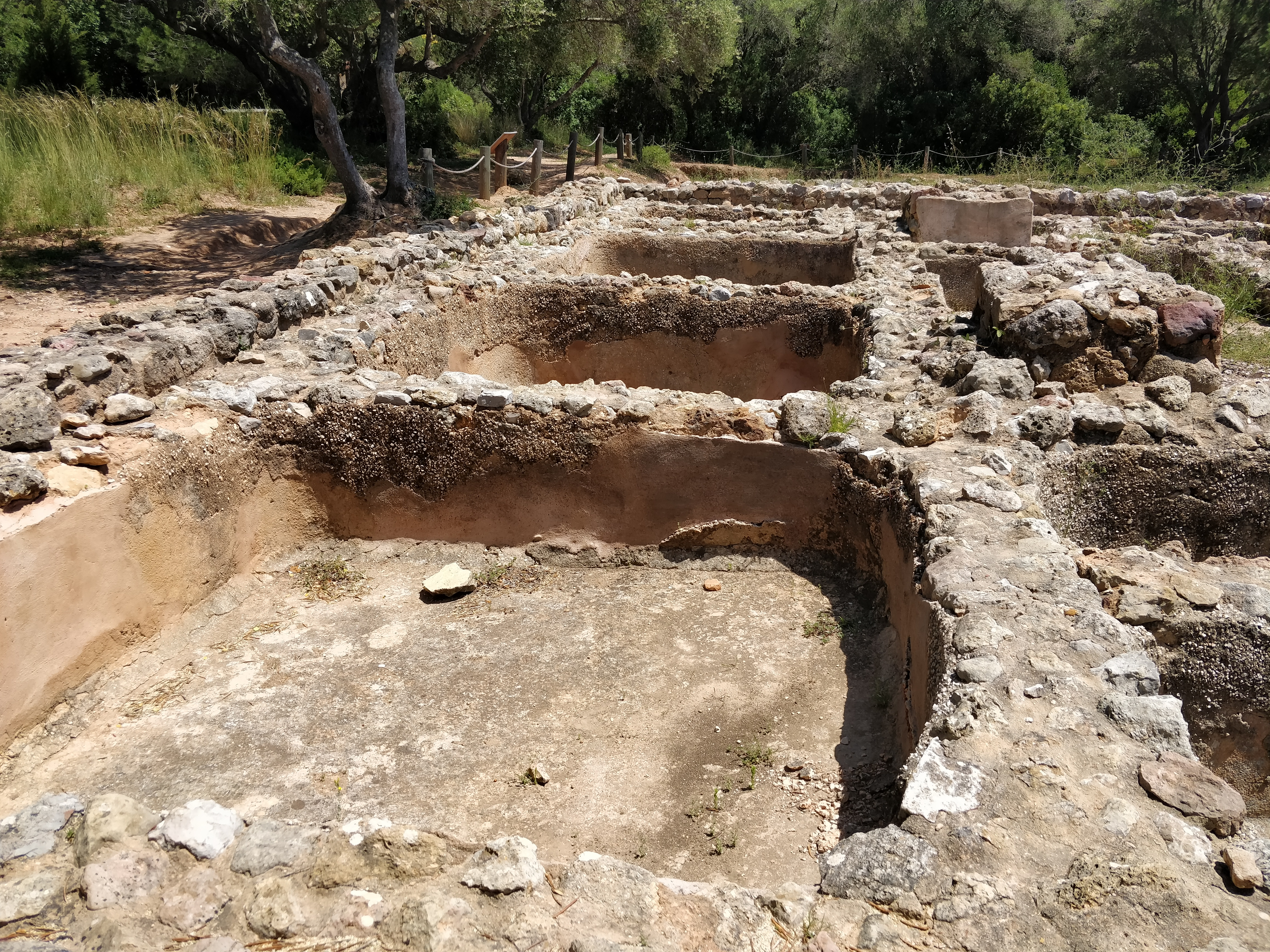
Fish processing tanks

The excavations suggested that the site had three phases of occupation, within which there were several phases of construction. The first phase of occupation and construction took place roughly during the third quarter of the 1st century AD. During this phase, most of the structures in the industrial area were built, including nine fish-salting and processing tanks, with widths between 1 and 2.6 metres and depths of between 0.5 and 1 metre. These salting tanks were lined by an opus signinum, as a form of waterproofing, composed of gravel mortar, hydraulic lime and sand. The corners of the tanks were rounded, making them easier to clean and more hygienic. During this first phase warehouses were also erected, as were the owner's house and, possibly, workers' accommodation. There was also a fresh-water well, as yet unexcavated, that benefitted from the proximity of one of the rare springs in the area, together with a cistern.

Also constructed at this time were heated Roman baths. These were heated using the hypocaust system: a furnace in the basement heated the air, which in turn heated the floor of the bathhouse and the rooms of the caldarium. Still visible are several pillars supporting the pavement under which the hot air circulated. Also visible is the marble-covered frigidarium. Also during the first phase of occupation, towards the end of the 1st century AD, changes were made in the fish-processing facilities with the addition of two new tanks. These were less deep and more permeable, leading the archaeologists to believe that they were for the storage of salt and/or fish and not for the production of fish sauces and other preparations.

The first phase of occupation came to an end at the end of the 1st century AD and the site appears not to have been occupied again until the middle of the 4th century. At this time construction work consisted mainly of repairs to the existing structures so fish processing could once again be carried out. Less care was taken with the quality of the building materials used, a characteristic of the declining years of the Empire, and some materials from the first two phases of construction were recycled. Drainage of rainwater and factory waste was improved.

Roman occupation of the Creiro complex came to an end at the end of the 4th century AD, or beginning of the 5th. In the 12th century the third phase of occupation took place, during the Almohad period of the Muslim occupation of Portugal.

== See also ==
- Roman ruins of Tróia
