= Grândola =

- Municipality
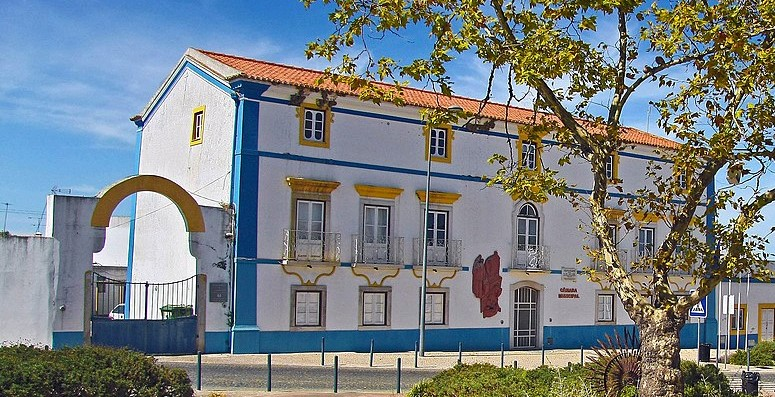
- Grândola City Hall

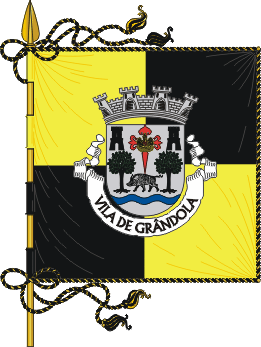
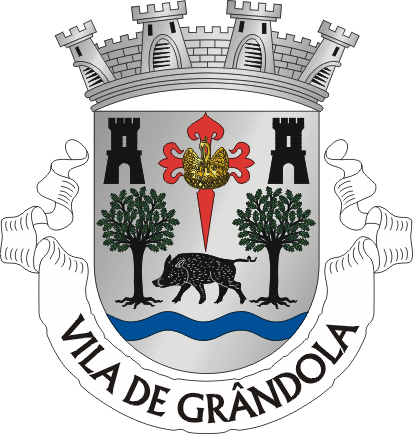
- Flag Coat of arms
- Interactive map of Grândola
- Location in Portugal
- Coordinates: 38°10′N 8°34′W
- Country: Portugal
- Region: Alentejo
- Intermunic. comm.: Alentejo Litoral
- District: Setúbal
- Seat: Grândola Municipal Chamber
- Parishes: 4

Government
  - President: Antonio Figueira Mendes (CDU)

Area
  - Total: 825.94 km^{2} (318.90 sq mi)

Population (2021)
  - Total: 13,822
  - Density: 16.735/km^{2} (43.343/sq mi)
- Time zone: UTC+00:00 (WET)
  - Summer (DST): UTC+01:00 (WEST)
- Local holiday: October 22
- Website: http://www.cm-grandola.pt

Grândola (pronounced [ˈɡɾɐ̃dulɐ], locally [ˈɡɾɐ̃dʷɫɐ]) is a town (vila) and municipality in Setúbal District in Portugal. The population in 2021 was 13,822, in an area of 825.94 square kilometres (318.90 mi^{2}). Besides the town of Grândola, it includes areas such as Tróia (part of Carvalhal parish), a peninsula between the Atlantic Ocean and the Sado River, and the popular summer resort of Melides. The municipality also features the Serra de Grândola mountain range and its coastline is partly within the Comporta region.

Grândola is known for inspiring the song "Grândola, Vila Morena" by José Afonso, which became an iconic symbol during the Carnation Revolution. The song was used as the second, secret radio broadcast signal on the 25th of April 1974, confirming that the military coup was underway. Its airing just after midnight following "E depois do adeus" on Rádio Renascença, marked the start of the revolution.

The municipal holiday is October 22, the anniversary of Grândola's first foral (charter). The current mayor of Grândola is Luís Vital Alexandre from the Socialist Party (PS).

== History ==
=== Early history and medieval period ===
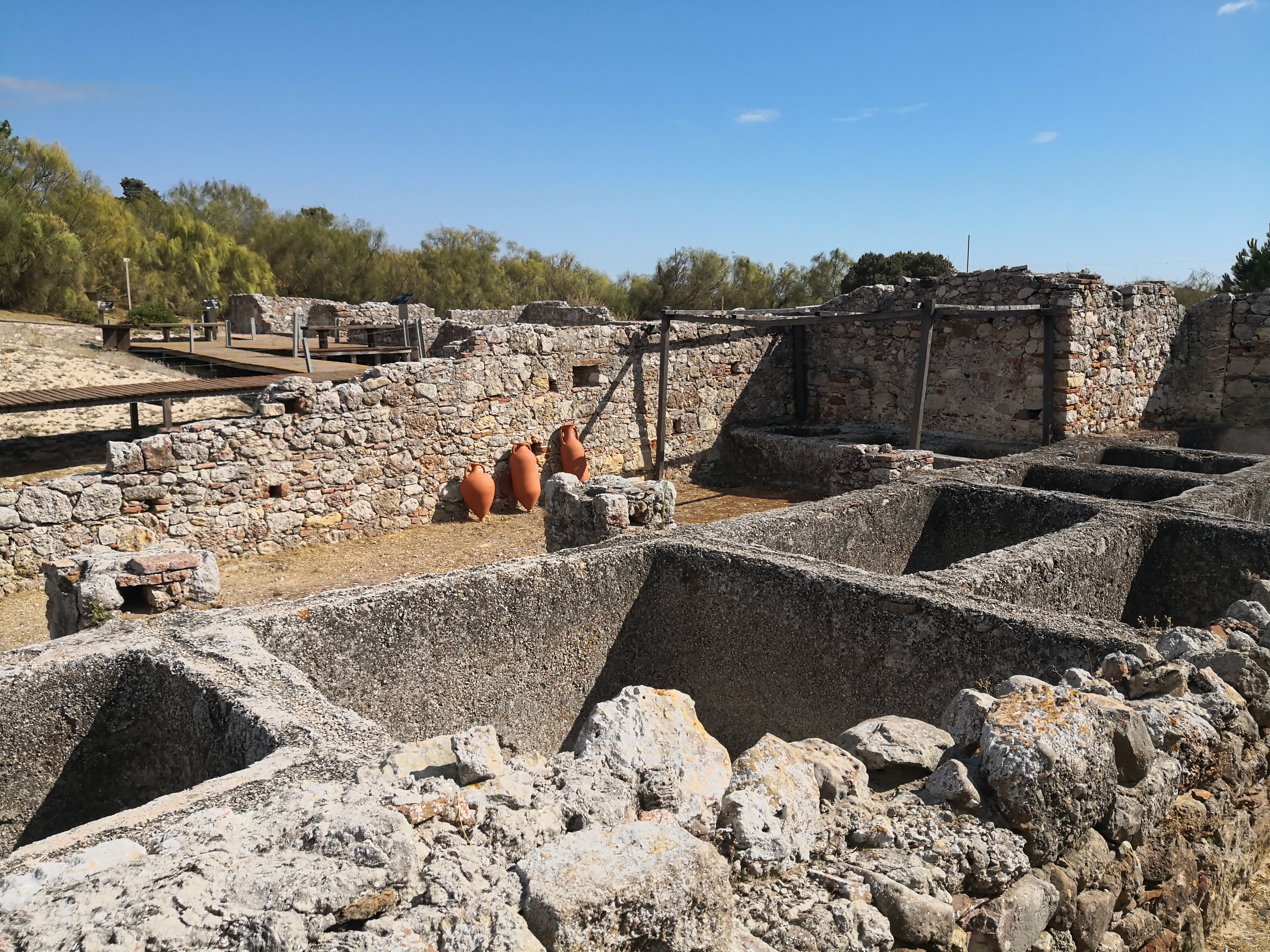
Roman ruins of Tróia

Archaeological studies indicate human presence in the region of Grândola since at least the Mesolithic period, with sites representing nearly all subsequent historical eras. During antiquity, the Roman period was likely the time when Grândola's territory reached its highest levels of population, economic activity, and social development. Archeological sites in the municipality from this period include the Roman Dam of Pego da Moura and the Roman ruins of Tróia.

Following the establishment of Portugal, the territory became part of the domain of Alcácer do Sal and was largely under the control of the Military Order of Santiago. Around 1380, during the reign of King John I, the Commandery of Grândola was established. This event, along with policies implemented by the crown and the Order of Santiago, contributed to the area's development. Land was distributed, chapels and mills were constructed, and the settlement of Gramdolla was recognized as a village. By the late Middle Ages, the village had a population of approximately 150, while the wider Commandery housed around 900 inhabitants across 220 households.

=== Early modern period ===
In 1544, King John III granted Grândola the status of a vila (town) and established it as a municipality, independent of Alcácer do Sal. This municipality was divided into three parishes: Grândola, Bayrros (Azinheira dos Barros), and Santa Margarida da Serra. At that time, the territory of the municipality was smaller than it is today.

Significant civic and religious infrastructure was developed after the town's elevation, including the construction of a town hall, a jail, a pillory, a hospital, a Santa Casa da Misericórdia, and several chapels and churches. A common granary was established in 1579 to provide low-interest seed loans to poor farmers, operating until around 1880.

By 1600, the municipality’s population was about 1,550, with 480 residents in the town itself. The population continued to grow in the following centuries, reaching approximately 4,000 by 1798. The local economy was centered on agriculture, particularly cereal and wine production, along with livestock raising and hunting. Industries such as milling, weaving, construction, and clothing were prominent, while tanning, pottery, and ceramics were present to a lesser extent. In 1855, the municipality expanded with the annexation of Melides and São Mamede do Sádão, extending its boundaries to the coast. By 1900, the population had grown to 7,539.

=== 20th and 21st centuries ===
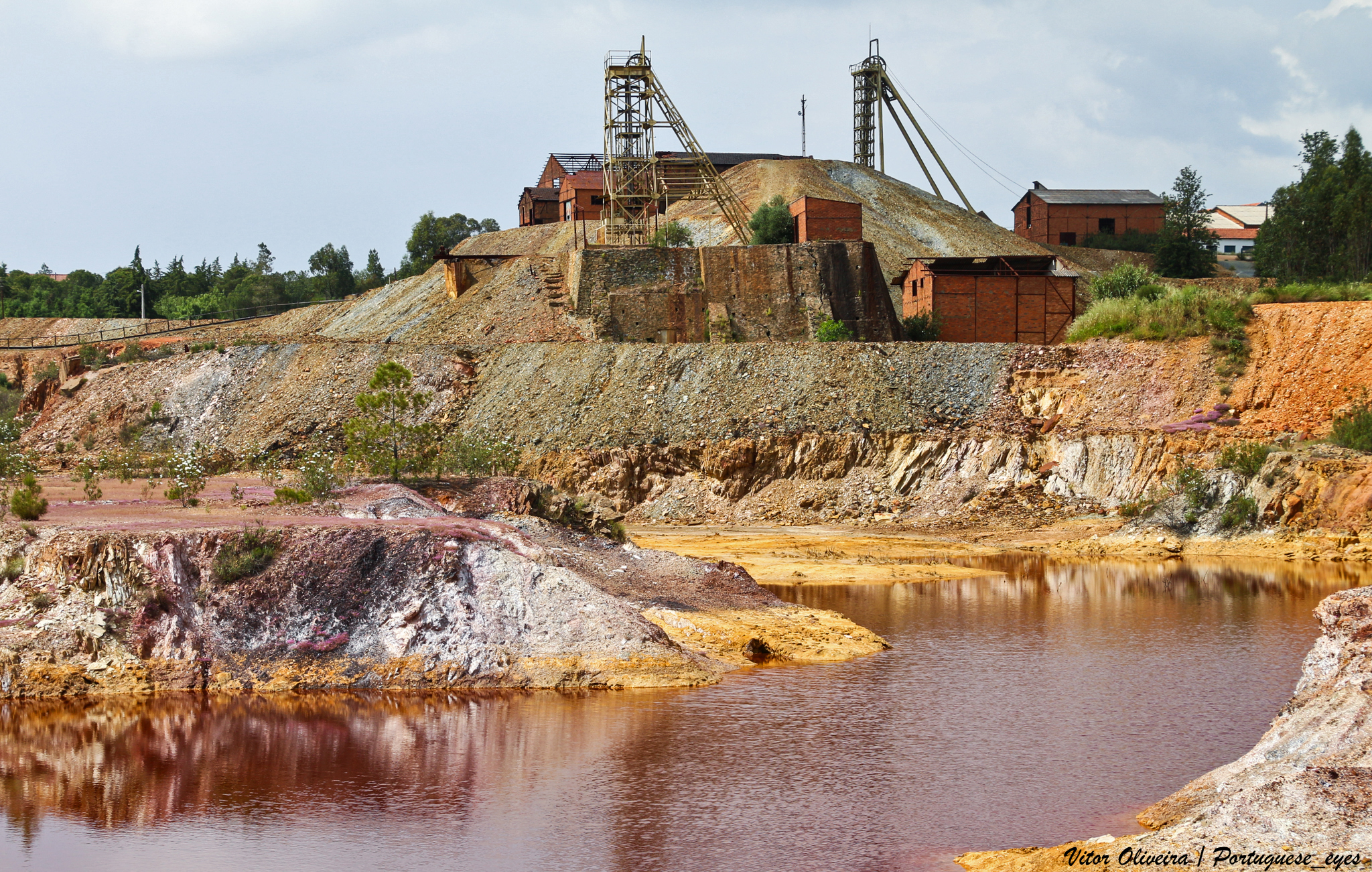
Lousal mine

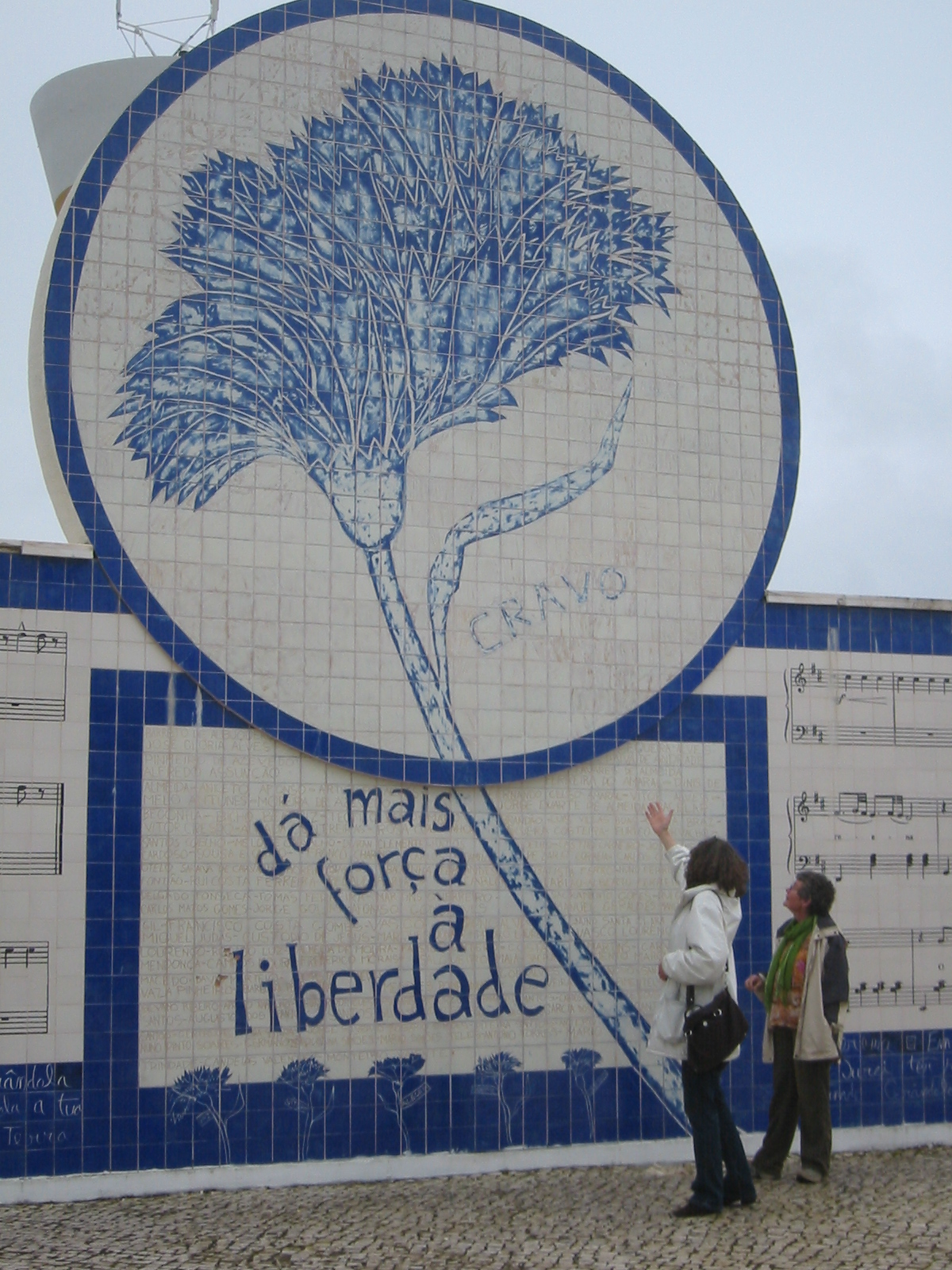
Carnation Revolution memorial

The 20th century brought major changes to the region. The Estado Novo's ruralist and protectionist policies, such as the Campanha do Trigo, led to an increase in cereal production, particularly wheat, while rice cultivation gained prominence in the lowlands of Melides and Carvalhal. The development of the Sul railway line in 1861 boosted the cork industry, which saw the establishment of numerous factories, including one that employed over 300 workers.

Mining also played a significant role, with the Lousal pyrite mines becoming a hub of activity under the management of the Mines et Industries group from 1936. At its peak in 1960, the mining village had around 2,000 inhabitants, a sharp contrast to the approximately 300 residents today.

With the increase in the number of rural workers, factory laborers, and miners, along with a rise in political awareness, worsening living conditions, and the repression under Salazar's regime, strikes and other popular protests became more common. The number of people arrested for political reasons also grew, earning Grândola a reputation as a revolutionary town. The population growth also contributed to the formation of cultural, sports, and recreational associations, particularly in the town center. Among these was the Sociedade Musical Fraternidade Operária Grandolense, which would later inspire José Afonso's famous song Grândola, Vila Morena.

Population growth in the early 20th century was significant, rising from 7,539 in 1900 to a peak of 21,216 in 1950. However, the mid-century saw a decline driven by economic challenges, political repression, the colonial war and migration. The closure of the Lousal mines in 1988 and the decline of the cork and agricultural sectors contributed to population loss and economic shifts. As a result, the municipality experienced significant aging of its population, leading to a shrinking workforce and the closure of schools.

Following the Carnation Revolution in 1974, the municipality entered a new phase, with democratic governance leading to improvements in social infrastructure. Economic activities shifted towards tourism and service industries, emphasizing environmental preservation and cultural initiatives.

== Climate ==
Grândola has a Mediterranean climate with hot summers and mild wet winters. The highest and lowest temperatures registered in the town were 45 °C (113 °F) and −4.5 °C (23.9 °F), respectively.

Climate data for Grândola, 1991-2020 normals, 1982-2000 extremes, altitude: 95 m (312 ft)
Month	Jan	Feb	Mar	Apr	May	Jun	Jul	Aug	Sep	Oct	Nov	Dec	Year
Record high °C (°F)	21.2 (70.2)	26.0 (78.8)	30.0 (86.0)	34.0 (93.2)	35.0 (95.0)	38.5 (101.3)	45.0 (113.0)	40.5 (104.9)	40.5 (104.9)	33.7 (92.7)	27.0 (80.6)	26.5 (79.7)	45.0 (113.0)
Mean daily maximum °C (°F)	14.3 (57.7)	15.6 (60.1)	18.5 (65.3)	20.6 (69.1)	23.7 (74.7)	27.5 (81.5)	30.2 (86.4)	31.0 (87.8)	28.2 (82.8)	23.7 (74.7)	18.5 (65.3)	15.1 (59.2)	22.2 (72.1)
Daily mean °C (°F)	9.3 (48.7)	10.5 (50.9)	12.9 (55.2)	14.6 (58.3)	17.3 (63.1)	20.7 (69.3)	22.8 (73.0)	23.2 (73.8)	20.8 (69.4)	17.5 (63.5)	13.1 (55.6)	10.4 (50.7)	16.1 (61.0)
Mean daily minimum °C (°F)	4.3 (39.7)	5.4 (41.7)	7.2 (45.0)	8.5 (47.3)	10.9 (51.6)	13.5 (56.3)	15.4 (59.7)	15.3 (59.5)	13.3 (55.9)	11.2 (52.2)	7.7 (45.9)	5.6 (42.1)	9.9 (49.7)
Record low °C (°F)	−4.5 (23.9)	−3.8 (25.2)	−3.0 (26.6)	−1.3 (29.7)	4.0 (39.2)	5.0 (41.0)	5.5 (41.9)	8.5 (47.3)	5.5 (41.9)	1.5 (34.7)	−1.5 (29.3)	−4.0 (24.8)	−4.5 (23.9)
Average rainfall mm (inches)	71.8 (2.83)	56.4 (2.22)	44.8 (1.76)	46.9 (1.85)	36.3 (1.43)	8.2 (0.32)	1.5 (0.06)	3.1 (0.12)	30.0 (1.18)	75.7 (2.98)	80.6 (3.17)	86.4 (3.40)	541.7 (21.32)
Source: Portuguese Environment Agency

== Parishes ==
Population of Grândola (1600–2021)
Year	Pop.	±%
1600	1,550	—
1798	4,000	+158.1%
1864	5,553	+38.8%
1878	6,230	+12.2%
1890	6,887	+10.5%
1900	7,539	+9.5%
1911	10,011	+32.8%
1920	11,081	+10.7%
1930	13,370	+20.7%
1940	17,699	+32.4%
1950	21,376	+20.8%
1960	21,060	−1.5%
1970	15,525	−26.3%
1981	16,042	+3.3%
1991	13,767	−14.2%
2001	14,901	+8.2%
2011	14,826	−0.5%
2021	13,822	−6.8%
Estimates for 1600 and 1798 exclude the areas of Melides and São Mamede do Sádão. Source: INE

Administratively, the municipality is divided into four civil parishes (freguesias):

- Azinheira dos Barros e São Mamede do Sádão
- Carvalhal
- Melides
- Grândola e Santa Margarida da Serra

== Transports ==
Grândola is well-connected by road, with several major highways providing access to the town. The A2 highway links Grândola to Lisbon to the north and the Algarve to the south, while the toll-free IC1 offers an alternative route. Additionally, the A26/IP8 highway connects the town to Sines in the southwest and Beja in the east.

The municipality is served by several bus lines, including Rede Expressos, which provides daily connections to various locations across Portugal. The Rodoviária do Alentejo also operates services linking Grândola to other towns in the Alentejo region.

Grândola is integrated into Portugal's rail network via the Linha do Sul, which connects Lisbon to the Algarve. The town's railway station is served by Alfa Pendular, Intercidades, and regional trains, all operated by Comboios de Portugal (CP).

The northern part of the municipality is accessible by ferry across the Sado River, connecting Setúbal to the Tróia Peninsula.

== Notable inhabitants ==
- Hélder Costa (born 1939) a Portuguese dramatist and playwright
- Sonia dos Reis (born 1977) a politician, member of the Social Democratic Party (PSD)
- Dinis Vital (1932–2014) a Portuguese football goalkeeper, with upwards of 461 club caps

== In popular culture ==
Portuguese singer-songwriter José Afonso was inspired to write his song "Grândola, Vila Morena" after performing in Grândola on 17 May 1964. "Grândola, Vila Morena", first recorded in 1971, became an iconic song in Portugal after being used as a radio-broadcast signal by the Portuguese Armed Forces Movement during the 1974 Portuguese coup d'état, which led to the Carnation Revolution and the transition to democracy in Portugal.

== Gallery ==
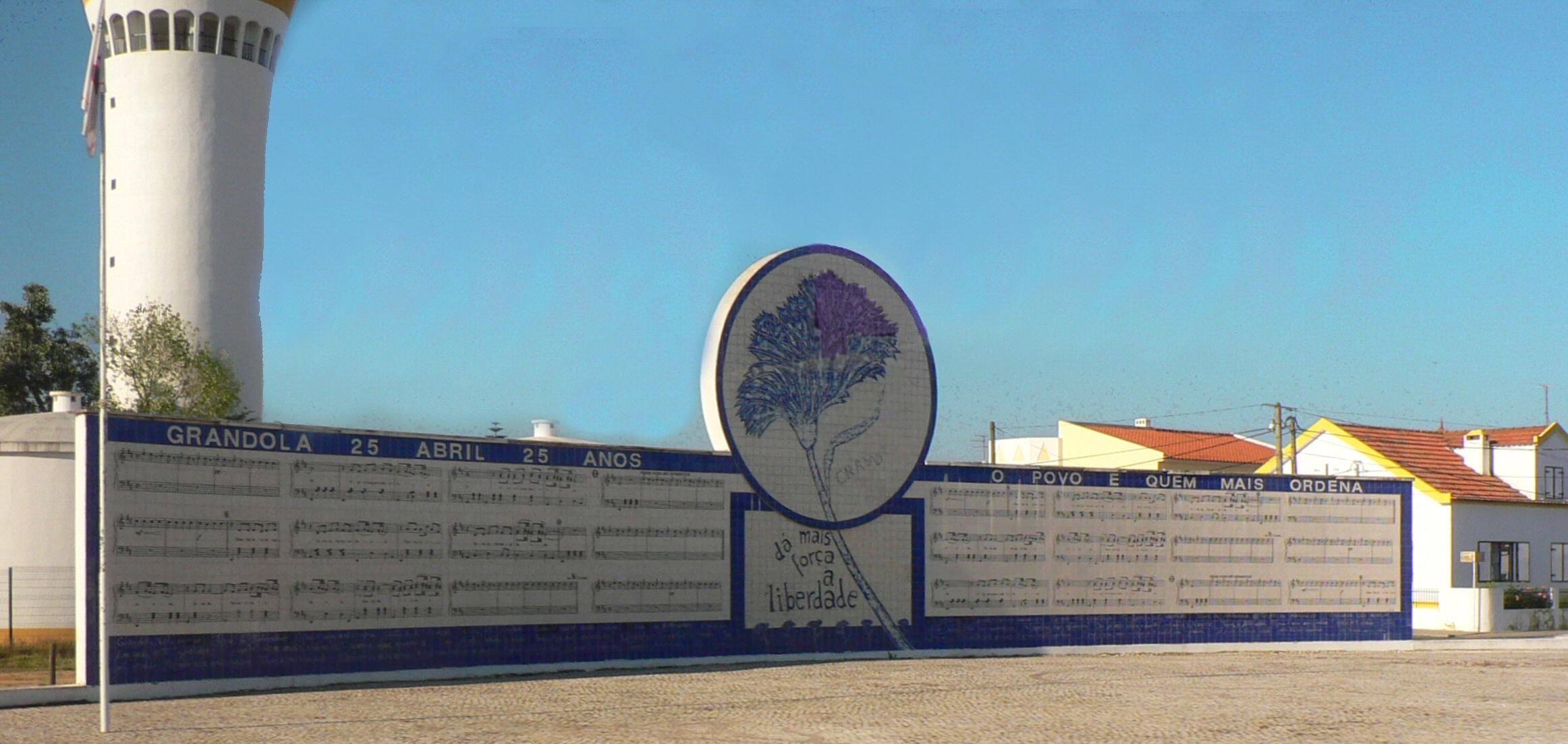
Monument to the Carnation Revolution

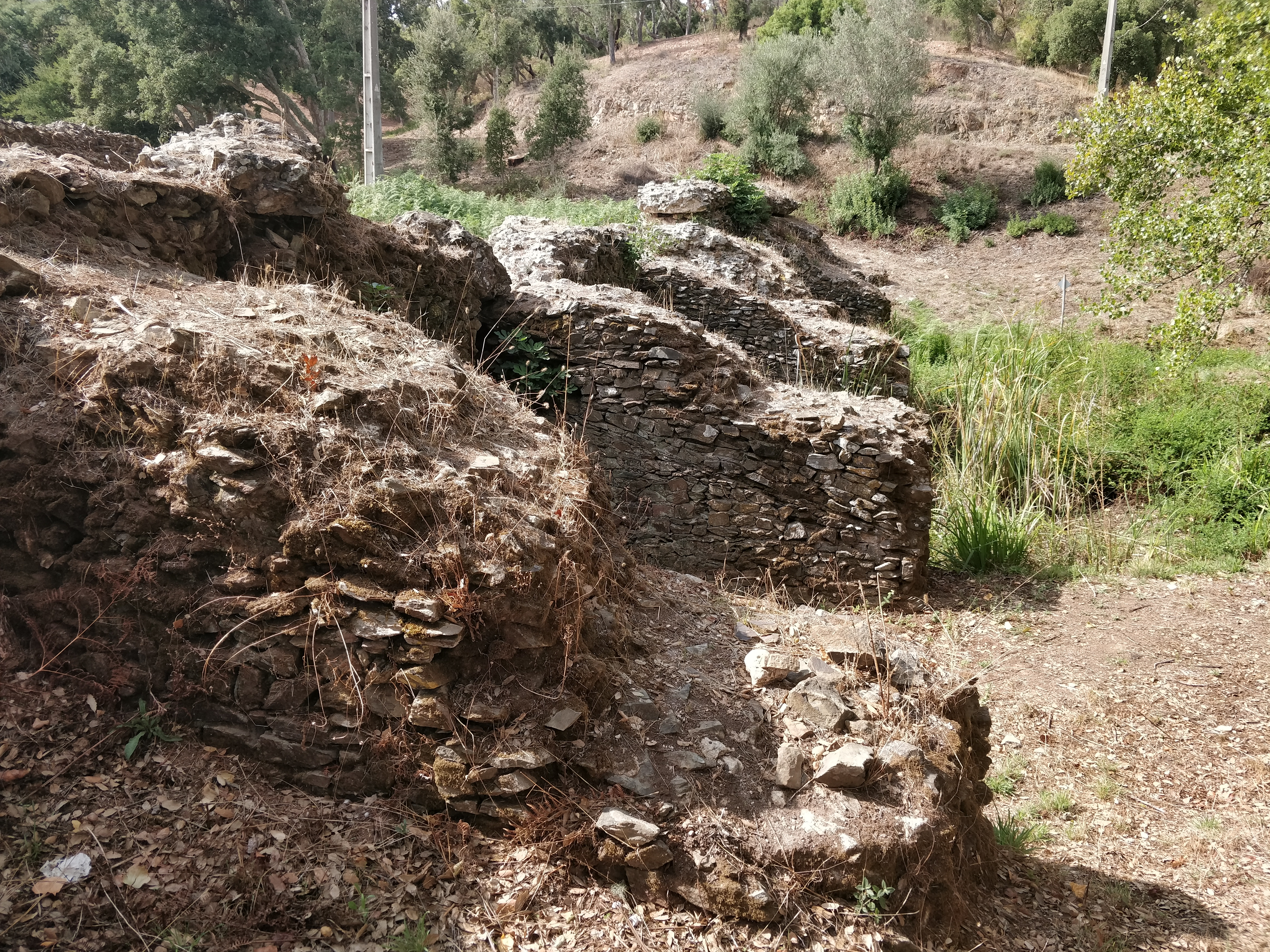
Roman Dam of Pego da Moura

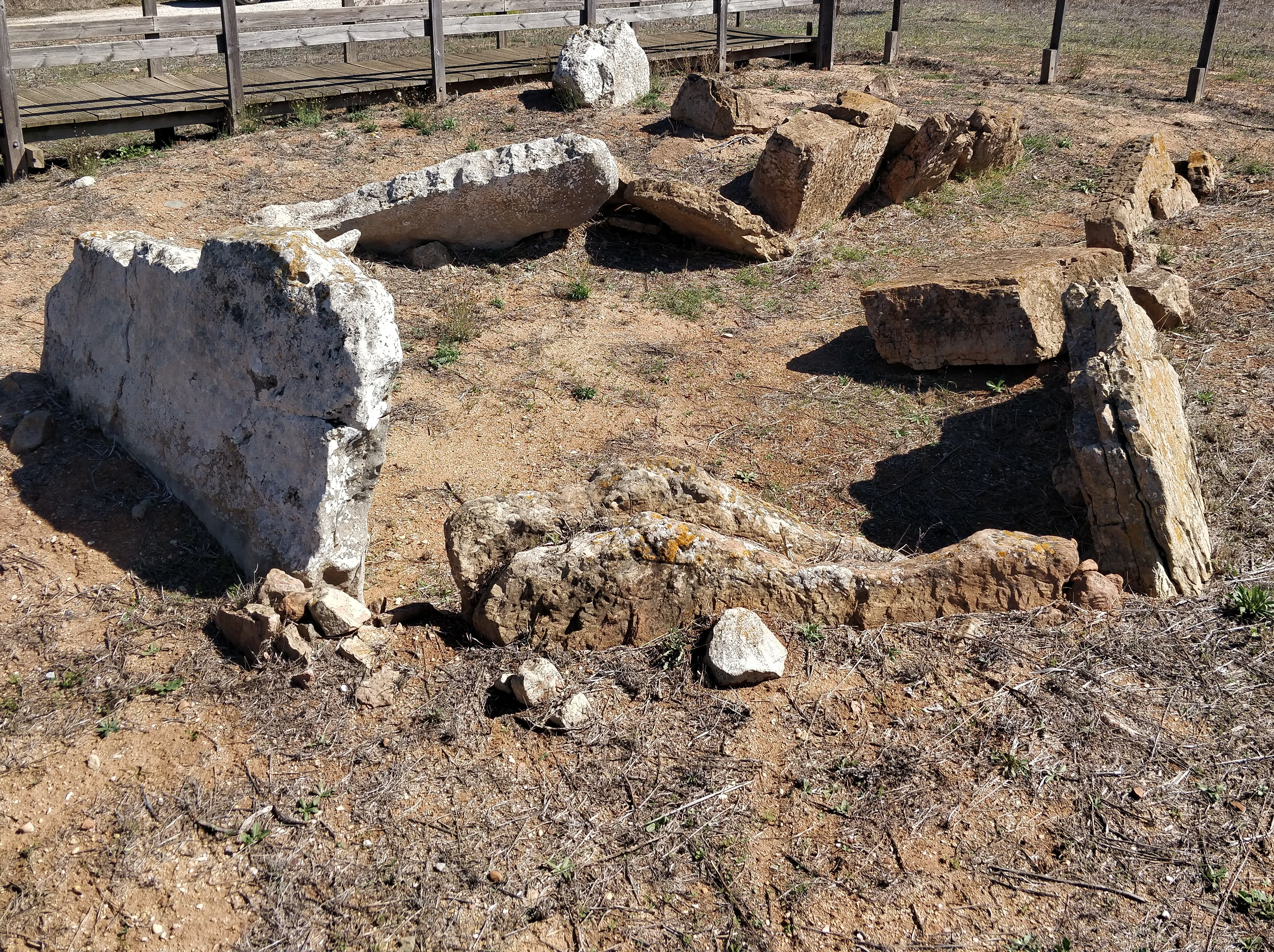
Dolmen of Pedra Branca, a burial tomb from the late Neolithic

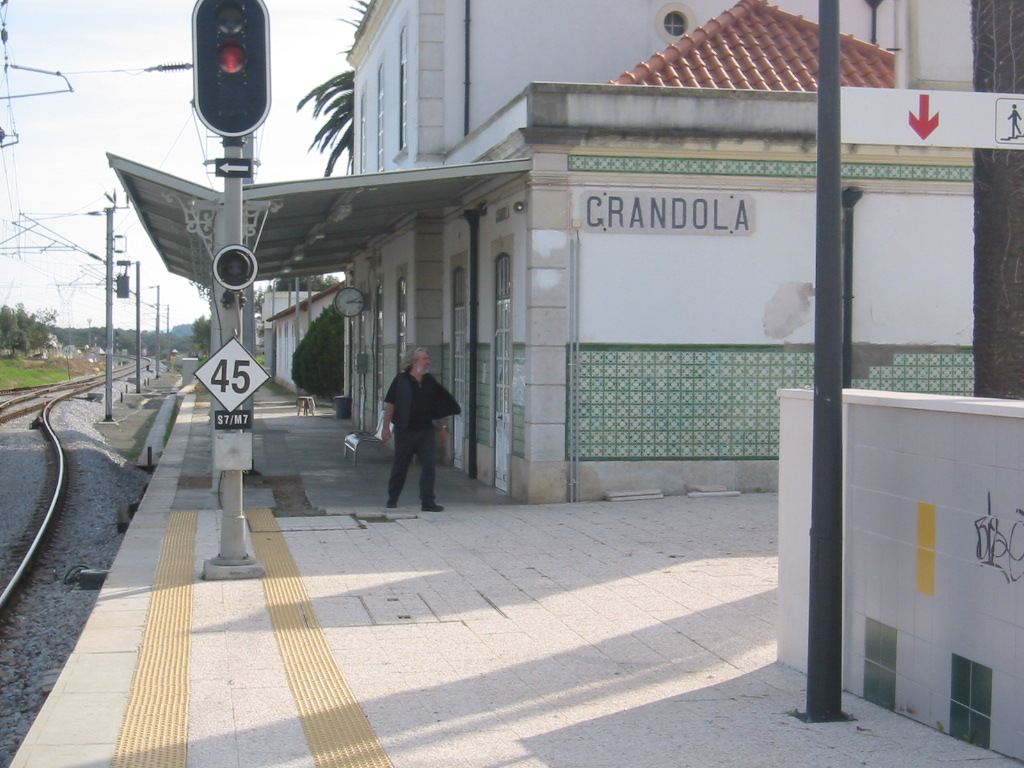
Grandola railway station

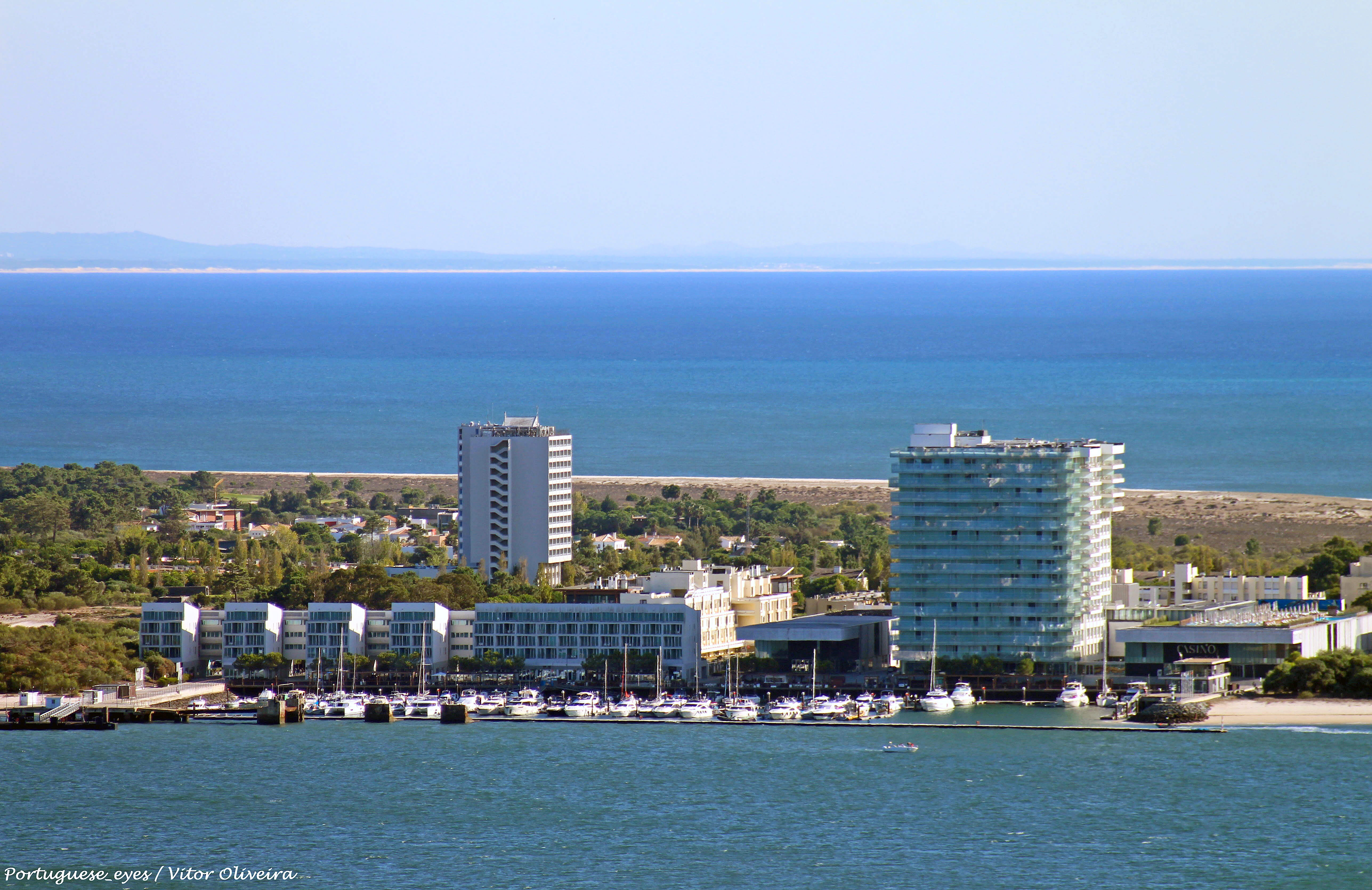
Troía peninsula

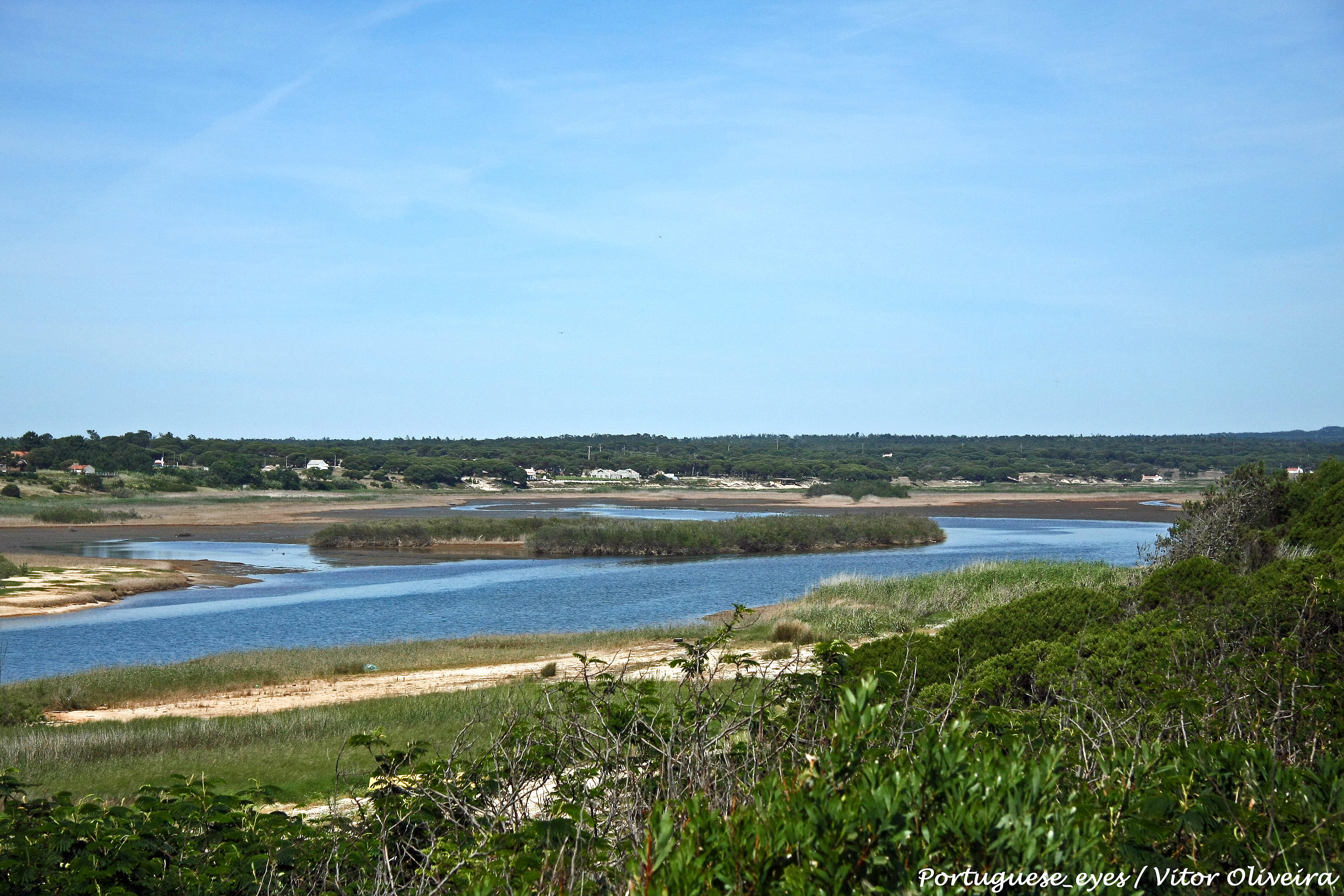
Melides lagoon

== See also ==
- "Grândola, Vila Morena" – a song by José Afonso associated with the Carnation Revolution
