= Grândola Municipal Chamber =

Legislative body of Grândola

Coordinates: 38.17686°N 8.56894°W

Grândola Municipal Chamber Câmara Municipal de Grândola
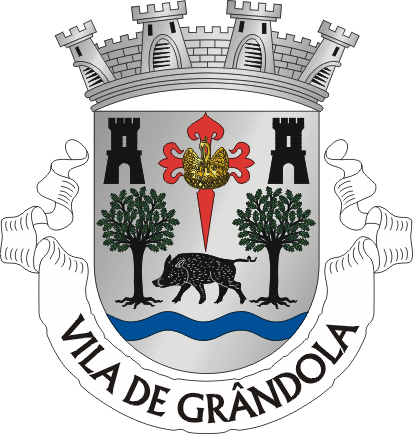
- Coat of arms of the town of Grândola

Type
- Type: Câmara municipal
- Term limits: 3

History
- Founded: 22 October 1544; 481 years ago

Leadership
- President: António Figueira Mendes, CDU since 20 October 2021
- Vice President: Carina de Jesus Faustino Batista, CDU since 20 October 2021

Structure
- Seats: 7
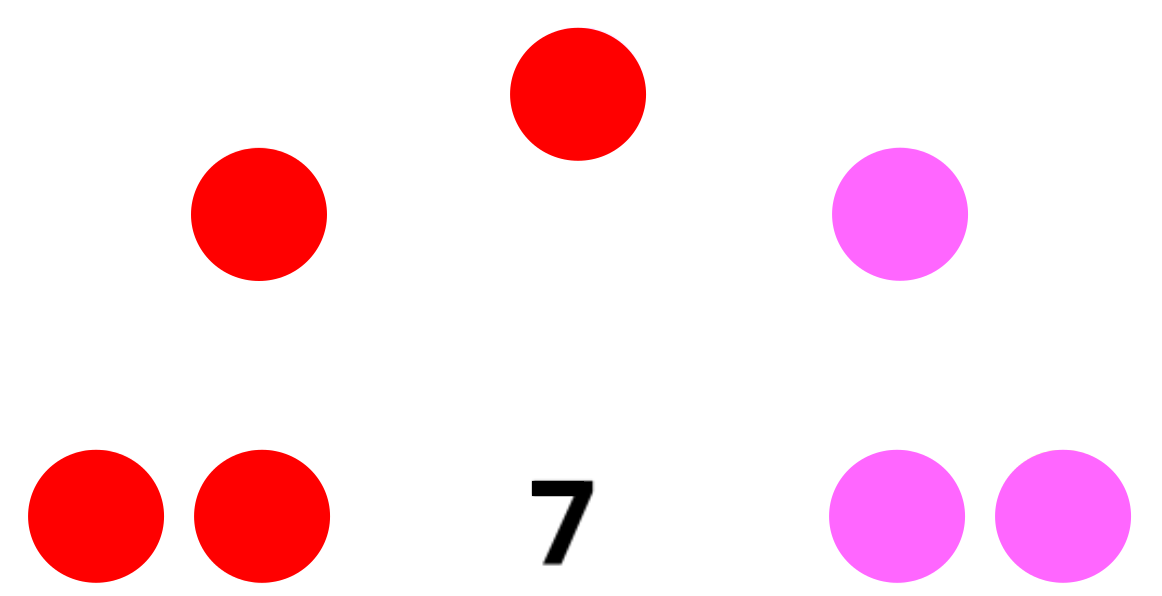
- Political groups: Municipal Executive (4) CDU (4) Opposition (3) PS (3)
- Length of term: Four years

Elections
- Last election: 26 September 2021
- Next election: Sometime between 22 September and 14 October 2025

Meeting place
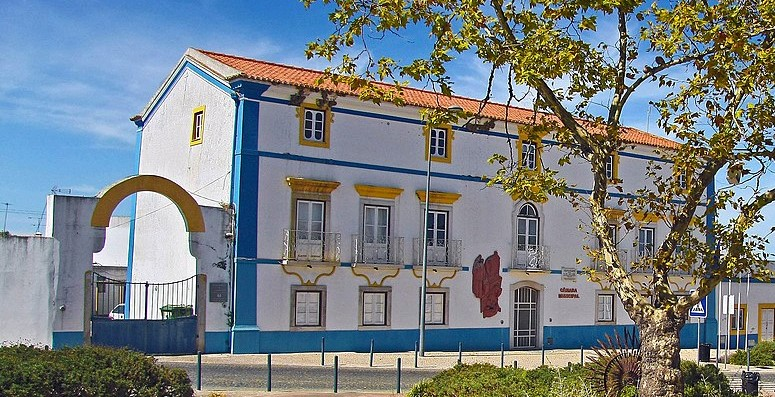
- Paços do Concelho de Grândola

Website
- www.cm-grandola.pt

The Grândola Municipal Chamber (Portuguese: Câmara Municipal de Grândola) is the administrative authority in the municipality of Grândola. It has 4 freguesias in its area of jurisdiction and is based in the town of Grândola, on the Setúbal District. These freguesias are: Azinheira dos Barros e São Mamede do Sádão; Carvalhal; Grândola e Santa Margarida da Serra and Melides.

The Grândola City Council is made up of 7 councillors, representing, currently, two different political forces. The first candidate on the list with the most votes in a municipal election or, in the event of a vacancy, the next candidate on the list, takes office as President of the Municipal Chamber.

== List of the Presidents of the Municipal Chamber of Grândola ==
- António Figueira Mendes – (1976–1989)
- Cândido Matos Gago – (1989–1993)
- Fernando Travassos – (1993–2001)
- Carlos Vicente Beato – (2001–2013)
- António Figueira Mendes – (2013–2025)

(The list is incomplete)
