= Lousal =

Coordinates: 38.03°N 8.43°W

Lousal is a mining village near Grândola. In 1998, the first Mining Museum in Portugal was founded by a project of Alfredo Tinoco.
