= Hélder Costa (playwright) =

Portuguese dramatist and playwright

Hélder Costa (born 1939, in Grândola) is a Portuguese dramatist and playwright. He is director of the theatre company A Barraca, which is based at the Teatro Cinearte in Lisbon. After 25th April 1974, he returned to Portugal and was one of the founding members of the group A Barraca, where he is director and artistic director. The company won the UNESCO prize in 1992, directed several shows in Spain, Brazil, Denmark, and Mozambique. He has directed educational activities and participated in congresses and festivals in France, Germany, Switzerland, Argentina, Cape Verde, Mexico, Colombia, Venezuela, USA, USSR, Chile and Italy.
