= Roman Dam of Belas =

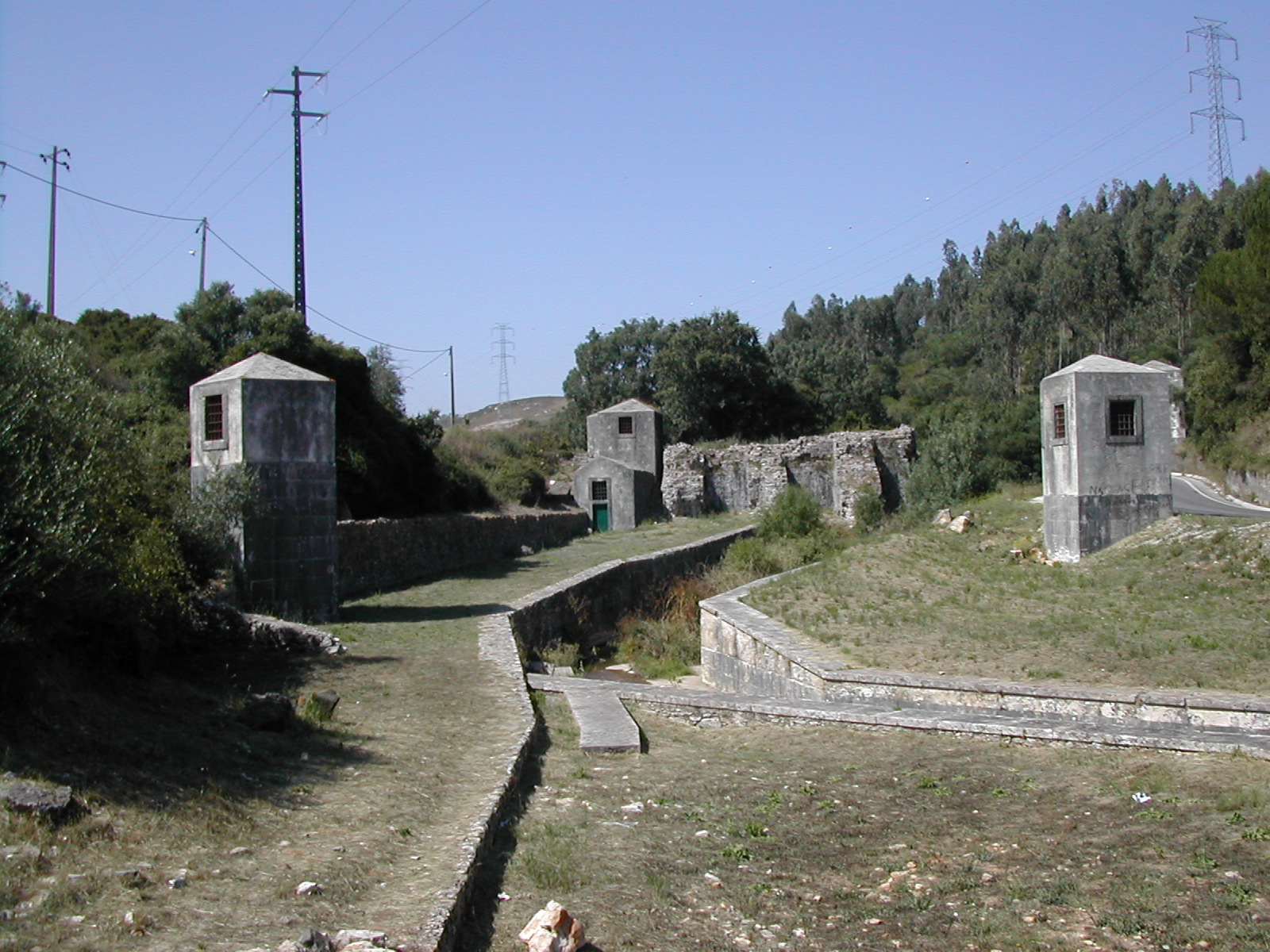
- Part of the Roman dam complex, showing the ventilation structures (foreground) and the remaining dam segment (background)
- Interactive map of Roman Dam of Belas
- Official name: Barragem Romana de Belas
- Country: Portugal
- Location: Queluz e Belas, Lisbon
- Coordinates: 38°47′35.6″N 9°14′40.2″W
- Opening date: 3rd century
- Operator: Companhia das Águas de Lisboa

Dam and spillways
- Height (foundation): 8 m (26 ft)
- Length: 15.5 m (51 ft)

The Roman Dam of Belas (Portuguese: Barragem Romana de Belas) is a 3rd-century Roman barrier constructed to serve the city of Olisipo, located in civil parish of Queluz e Belas, municipality of Sintra (in the Portuguese district of Lisbon).

== History ==
The dam was constructed in the 3rd century, although it is unclear when it was abandoned.

In 1571, Francisco de Holanda first identified the dam and fountains constructed in Lisbon (in Da Fábrica que falece a citada de Lisboa). Holanda, an exponent of the Portuguese Renaissance, painter and humanist, designed the dam and the fountains that were built in the Portuguese capital, then suggesting that they be reused to bring water to the city. This was typical of the posture of someone who had interned in Rome, promoted by the policies of King John III (1502–1557), that contemplated his cultural scholarship in Europe. During this period, Holanda was motivated by the rediscovery and elevation of the classical antiquity, whose testaments in Italy had influenced the principal courts of Europe.

In a regal letter (dated 1573) King Sebastian recommended that they conclude whatever steps were necessary to bring water to Lisbon, but little was concluded.

In 1619, King Philip III of Spain visited the old dam with the intention of promoting its reconstruction, under the direction of Leonardo Turriano. Within the year there was a letter from Madrid with report and four projects established to bring water to Lisbon, with the best being the Roman aqueduct. Taxes were established in order to cost the public works, but in 1623, a letter determined that the taxes would be used to assist overseas Indian territories.

In 1728, construction began on a new aqueduct that devastated part of the Roman in the area of "crags" because the dam was seen as unnecessary, given the abundance of possible sources of capture in the basin. The smaller buildings erected there, the ventilators are still maintained by the Companhia das Águas de Lisboa.

The construction of the Caneças-Lisbon roadway resulted in the destruction and burial of another wall of the dam.

== Architecture ==
The remnants of the dam are located in a rural place, implanted alongside and below the roadway, along the Carenque River, partially covered by forest and medium vegetation, situated 10 kilometres (33,000 ft) from the city centre.

The ancient ruins of the dam are survived by a central segment some 15.5 metres (51 ft) long, 8 metres (26 ft) tall and 7 metres (23 ft) wide, and reinforced by three buttresses.

It extends in the local occupied by roadway and the other end to the lateral of the valley, where a great part of the wall was destroyed. The reservoir created by the dam warehoused approximately 125 cubic metres (4,400 ft^{3}) of water. The channel from the structure extends 1,300 metres (4,300 ft) and is visible as it still intersects the more modern Águas Livres Aqueduct that was built over the old structures.

== See also ==
- List of Roman dams
- Roman Dam of Pego da Moura
