= Roman Dam of Pego da Moura =

Roman Empire dam near Grândola, Portugal

- Barragem Romana do Pego da Moura
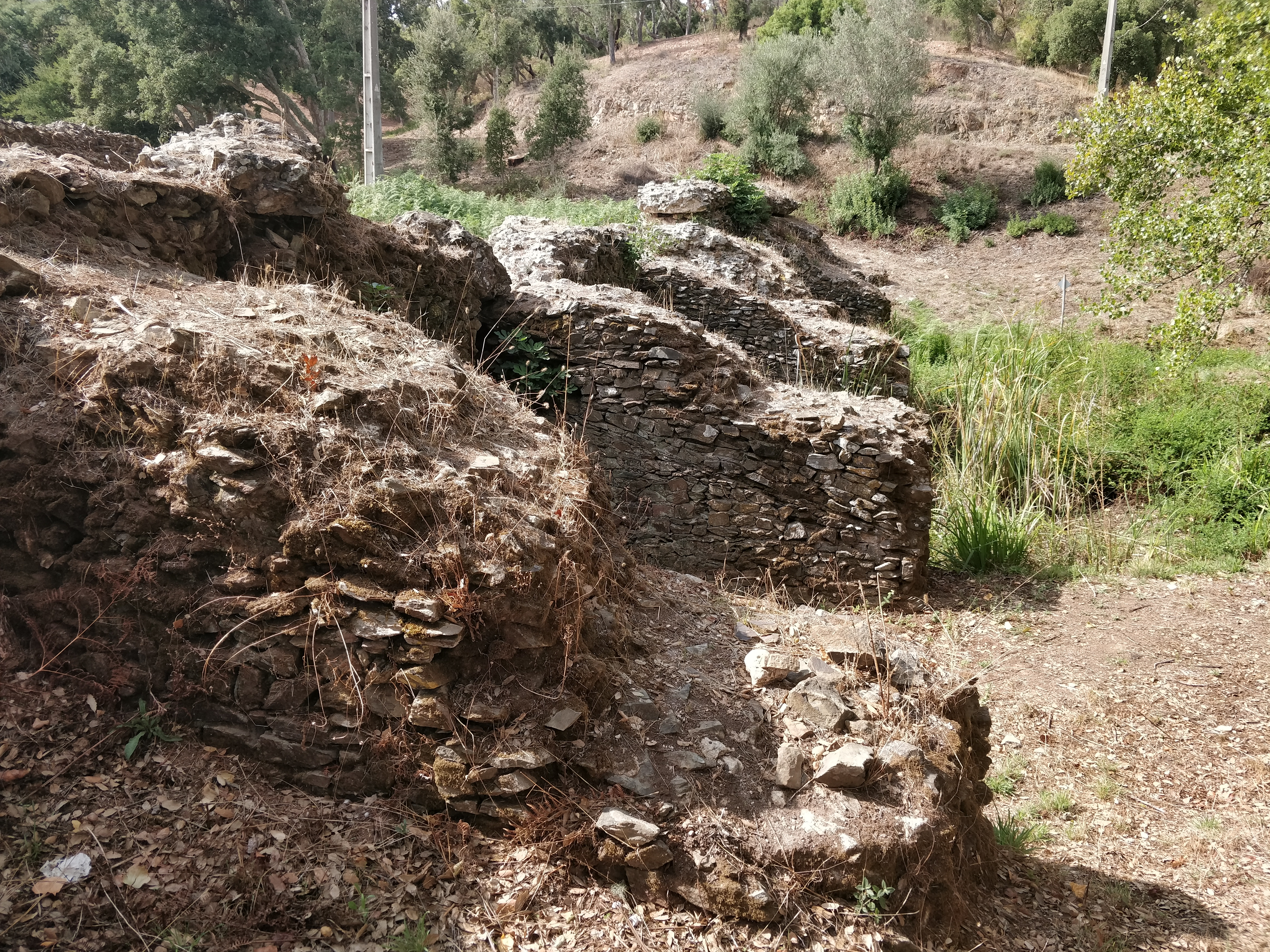
- Photo of the dam with the buttresses clearly visible
- Interactive map of Roman Dam of Pego da Moura
- 38°09′18″N 8°34′42″W
- Type: Ruins from the Roman Empire
- Location: Grândola, Setúbal District, Portugal

Site notes
- Excavation dates: 1990; 1997
- Discovered: 18th century
- Condition: Fair
- Public access: Yes

The Roman Dam of Pego da Moura is a small buttress dam situated in the municipality of Grândola in the Setúbal District of Portugal.

== Description ==
The dam was constructed during the middle of the Roman occupation of Portugal. Built in two phases, it consists of a rectilinear wall that was originally about 40 metres long. The ruins have a maximum height of 3 m. and a thickness of 2.90 m. There are six downstream buttresses that are 2.50 m. apart, which are around 2.70 m. thick and 2.90 m long. There is also a semi-circular well, built in masonry, which probably comes from a later period. The dam was almost entirely constructed using opus incertum. In the middle there is a vaulted chamber for which opus signinum was used. Traces of a water mill can be identified.

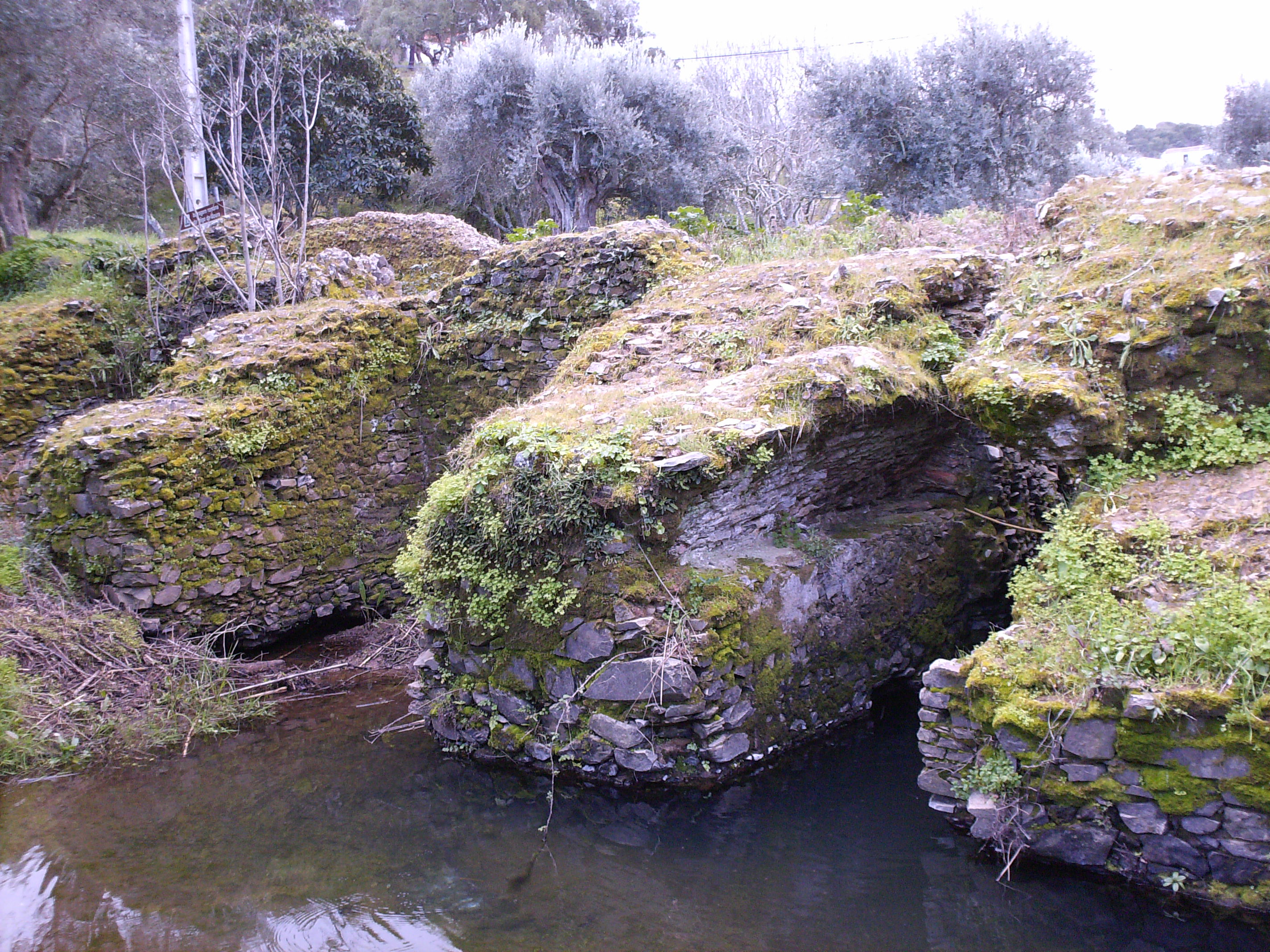
Roman dam of Pego da Moura.

The dam is located on a small stream and has an approximate watershed of just 2.3 km^{2}. The area of water that could be dammed was around 0.12 km^{2}. The small size means that researchers have concluded that the dam served agricultural purposes, despite evidence of aqueducts in the area.

== Archaeological investigations ==
The dam was first noted by Father Carvalho Costa in 1712 in his work, Corographia Portugueza. However, it was not until the 1990s that a brief archaeological study was conducted. Formal classification was concluded in 1996, after which a more detailed archaeological study was started.

== See also ==
- List of Roman dams and reservoirs
- Roman Dam of Belas
- Muro Dam
