= Santa Margarida da Serra =

- Civil parish
- Location in Portugal
- Coordinates: 38.123°N 8.602°W
- Country: Portugal
- Region: Alentejo
- Intermunic. comm.: Alentejo Litoral
- District: Setúbal
- Municipality: Grândola
- Disbanded: 2013

Area
  - Total: 13.6 km^{2} (5.3 sq mi)

Population (2001)
  - Total: 243
  - Density: 18/km^{2} (46/sq mi)
- Time zone: UTC+00:00 (WET)
  - Summer (DST): UTC+01:00 (WEST)

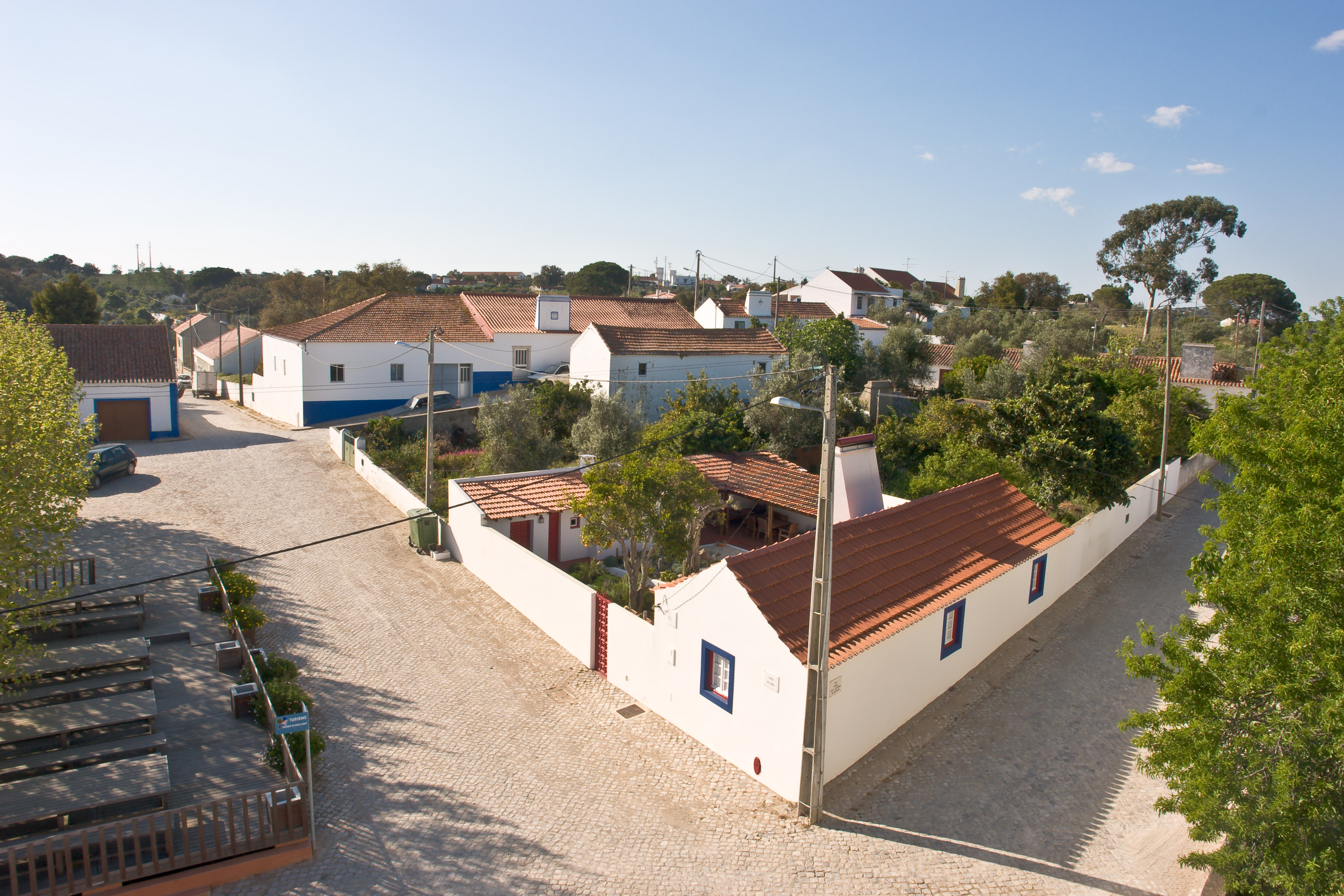

Santa Margarida da Serra is a former civil parish in the municipality of Grândola, Portugal. In 2013, the parish merged into the new parish Grândola e Santa Margarida da Serra. It covers an area of 52.38 km^{2} and had a population of 243 as of 2001.
