= Helder Moutinho =

Portuguese singer and songwriter

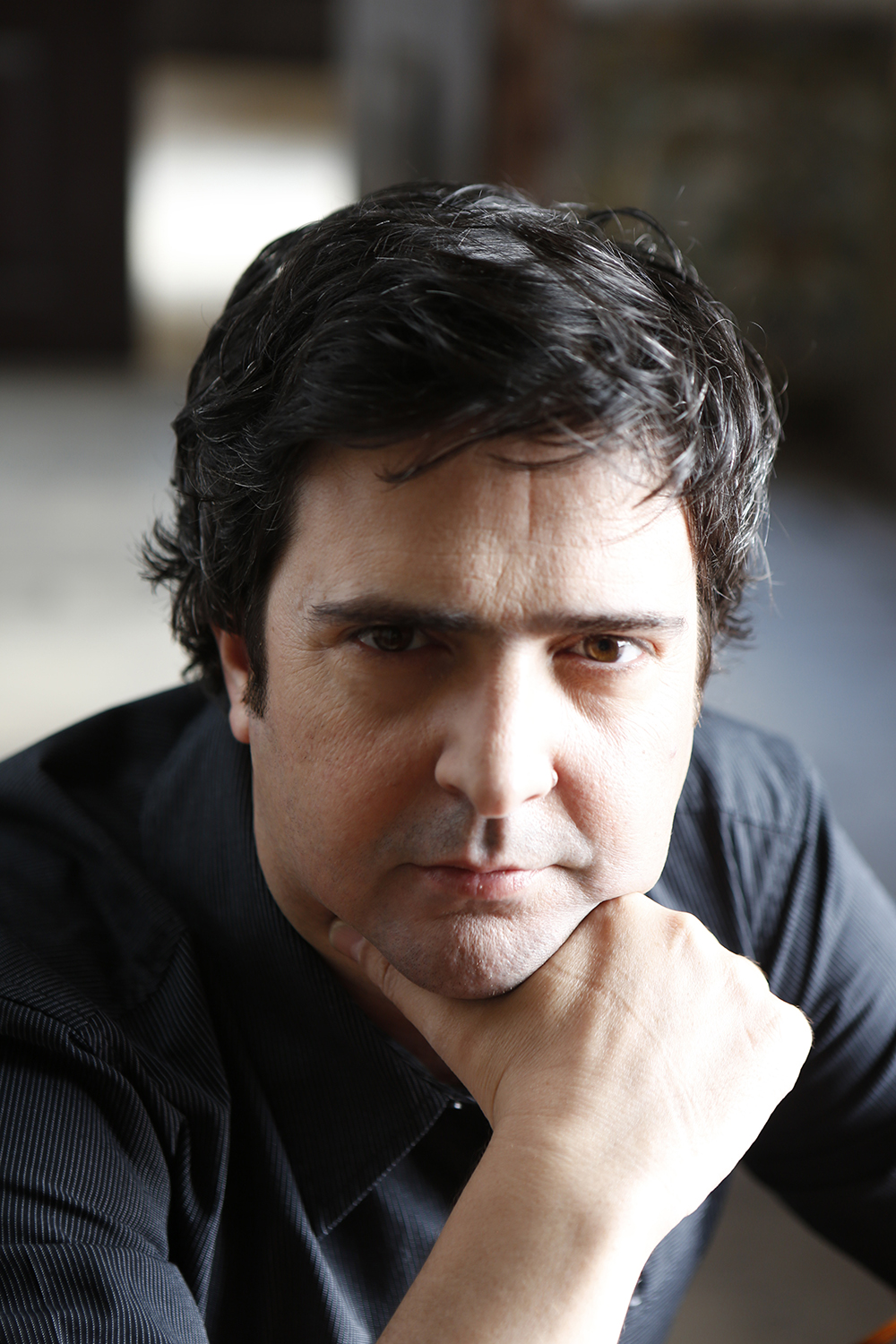
- Helder Moutinho

Background information
- Born: Hélder António Moutinho Paiva dos Santos; February 21, 1969 (age 56); Oeiras
- Origin: Portugal
- Genres: Fado
- Occupations: Singer, Manager
- Labels: HM Música
- Website: heldermoutinho.pt

Hélder António Moutinho Paiva dos Santos, artistically known as Helder Moutinho (Oeiras, 21 February 1969) is a Portuguese singer and songwriter, and one of the most distinguished artists in the Fado genre. He's also the brother of two renowned Fado singers, Camané and Pedro Moutinho.

== Origins ==
Born in Oeiras in 1969, Helder's family was deeply rooted in traditional Fado, whether singing, composing or writing poems, being is great-grandfather José Júlio da Silva Paiva (Fado composer and singer of the late 19th century) a prime example of this. In his youth and late teens, Helder attended various tertúlias and traditional Fado circles, further enticing the young Helder to take a chance on composing and writing poems.

== The Route of Casas de Fado ==
At 18 years of age, Helder Moutinho began to write his first poems in the most varied forms of traditional Fado. Soon he realized that all the tunes were familiar, something that marked, in stark way, his vision and ethos as performer and lyricist.

His relationship with Fado is further cemented with circles and gatherings of Fado Houses, amongst various poets, singers and musicians, causing a major change in the young singer, an exemplar alumnus in the art of being Fadista.

At 24, he's invited to join the cast of a typical Fado House, located in Bairro Alto, Lisbon's historic district. The year of 1994 marks the beginning of his career as an interpreter and, at the invitation of José Manuel Osorio and Ruben de Carvalho, he takes the stage for the first time, participating in the cycle "Fados na Mãe d'Água", part of Lisboa'94: European Capital of Culture program, an event that, once again, placed the Portuguese capital in the highest level of the Europe's cultural capitals.

Soon after, more invitations followed, making Helder one of the most sought after voices of Lisboa's live Fado shows in the most distinct and iconic Fado Houses, such as the "Taverna do Embuçado" and "Parreirinha de Alfama". In 1998, Helder would also perform live at Expo '98.

"Não Guardo Saudade À Vida", with lyrics of his own, is recorded by Mysia on her album "Garras dos Sentidos", in 1998. The Portuguese singer would also interpret the theme "Trago A Saudade Esquecida - Fado Carriche", also penned by Helder and Raúl Ferrão, a track that would feature on the soundtrack of the Portuguese movie "Fátima"

== "Sete Fados e Alguns Cantos" and "Luz de Lisboa" ==
His debut album, "Sete Fados e Alguns Cantos", was released in 1999, by the record label Ocarina, critically acclaimed by WOMEX's magazine "Strictly Mundial".

Followed by this album, Helder begins to create his own "tertúlias" and Fado gatherings, in a way to reflect and recreat the ones which he attended in his youth, which gave him more ground to prepare his second album, "Luz de Lisboa".

The album was released in 2004, once again by Ocarina. The release was widely applauded and received outstanding reviews. For the excellence presented in "Luz de Lisboa", Helder received the award "Prémio Amália Rodrigues" for Best Album of 2004. His song "Ai Do Vento" is featured on the compilation "Exploratory Music From Portugal 05".

== Internationalization ==
Already with his debut album released and with "Luz de Lisboa" on the way, Helder began to headline various live shows and tour in 2003, not only in Portugal but also all around the world, in cities such as New York, London, Amsterdam, Rudolstadt, Chicago, Toronto, Madrid, among others.

Those same live shows and extensive tours were fundamental for 2011's album "Que Fado É Este Que Trago", release by the label Farol Música, widely considered a landmark in Fado's recent history.

Soon after, Helder debuts the show "Fados, Tangos & Adagios – Concerto de Ano Novo" on 9 January 2011, accompanied by the string group "Amsterdam Soloist Quintet" and by the orchestra "Orquestra de Saxofones Vento do Norte".

== "1987" and Maria da Mouraria ==
Already in 2013, Helder presented his new work, the conceptual album "1987", an homage to the most universal of themes, Love itself.

With lyrics penned by him, João Monge, Pedro Campos and José Fialho, "1987" managed to surpass each accolade and appraisal all his preview albums had received, garnering the best reviews of his entire career and the whole attention of the Portuguese media, highlighting his role as one of Fado's main voices, and an ambassador for a whole new generation of Fadistas.

Following the nomination of Fado as World Cultural Heritage by UNESO and considering his tradition as Master of Ceremonies in various gatherings and "tertúlias", Helder was invited by Museu do Fado to become one of the managers of "Casa da Severa", an historical house located in Mouraria, once home of the legendary Fado singer Maria Severa, now transformed as a typical Fado House. Currently, the place is known as "Maria da Mouraria", a Fado House and restaurant, and one of highlights of Lisboa's Fado night life.

More recently, Helder has presented his two live shows "Um Fado Na Mouraria" and "Maria da Mouraria", frequently accompanied by Maria da Mouraria's resident musicians, Marco Oliveira, Vânia Conde and Ricardo Parreira, all around the World, in countries such as Finland, Holand, Russia, Canada, Spain, Poland, Belgium, USA, and many more.

Helder recently announced his fifth album, with a release date scheduled for 2016.

== Discography ==
Studio albums

- "Sete Fados e Alguns Cantos" (CD, Ocarina, 1999)
- "Luz de Lisboa" (CD, Ocarina, 2004)
- "Que Fado É Este Que Trago" (CD, Farol Música, 2008)
- "1987" (CD, Valentim de Carvalho, 2013)

Compilations

- Soundtrack of "Flor Do Mar" - Tenho Uma Onda No Mar (Tema Madeira)
- Various Artists: "Fado World Heritage" - Saudade (CD, Universal Music Portugal, 2012)

Featured albums

- Fernando Alvim: "O Fado E As Canções do Alvim" - Sete Sílabas de Chita e No Vão Da Minha Janela (CD, Universal Music Portugal, 2011)
