= Roman ruins of Tróia =

Roman Empire fish-processing factory near Setúbal, Portugal

- Ruínas Romanas de Tróia
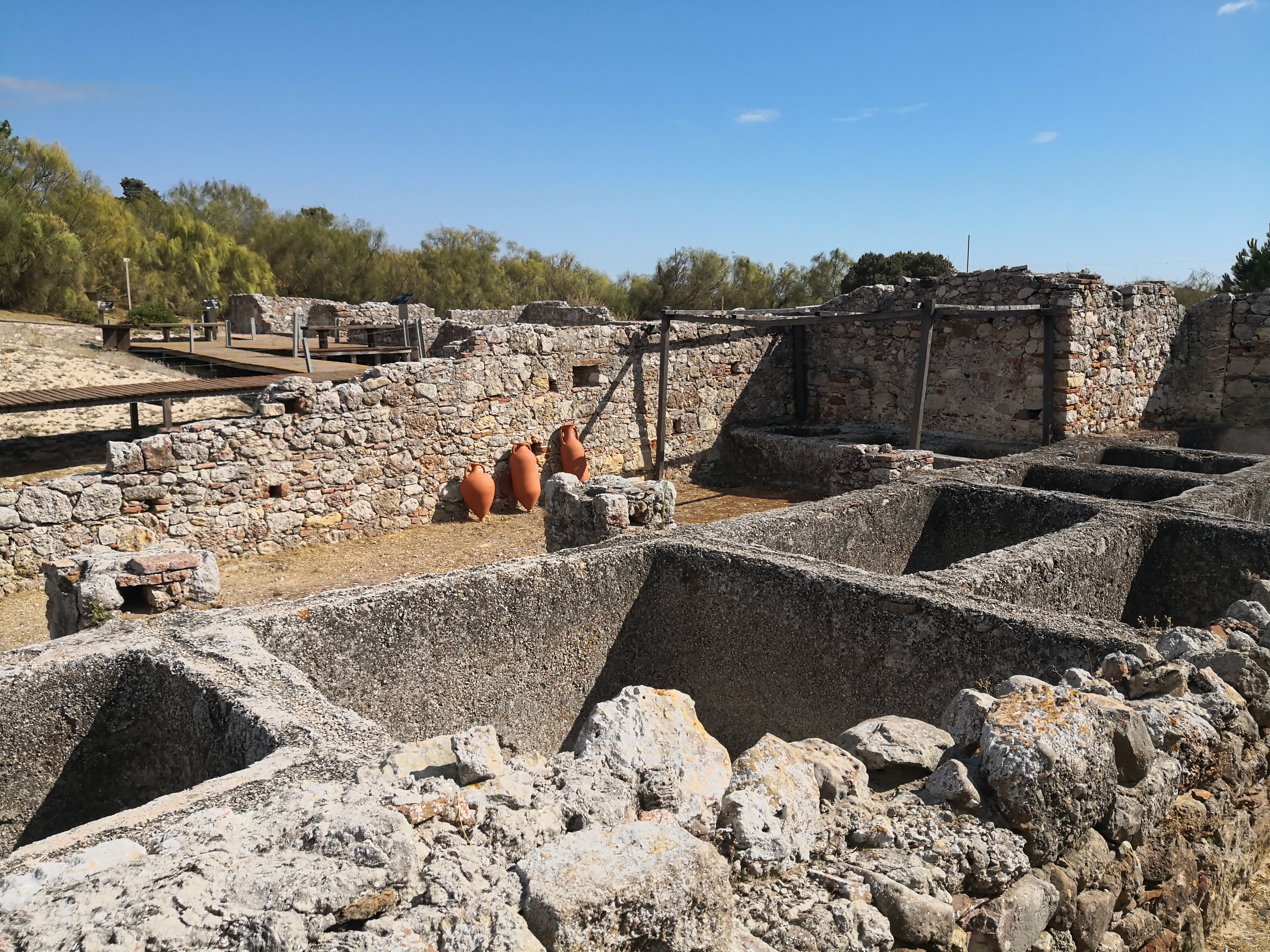
- Fish-processing tanks
- Interactive map of Roman ruins of Tróia
- 38°29′10″N 8°53′06″W
- Type: Ruins from the Roman Empire
- Location: Tróia Peninsula, Setúbal District, Portugal

Site notes
- Excavation dates: 1850; 1948; 1967; ongoing
- Archaeologists: Inês Vaz Pinto
- Discovered: 16th century
- Condition: Fair
- Public access: Yes

The Roman ruins of Tróia is an archaeological site located on the left bank of the River Sado, on the northwest side of the Tróia Peninsula, opposite Setúbal, in the Setúbal District of Portugal. The ruins, which include fish processing facilities, thermal baths, and burial sites are from between the 1st to 6th centuries CE. They have been classified as a Portuguese National Monument since 1910.

== Location ==
The site of the Roman ruins is located on a dune peninsula that separates the Sado estuary from the Atlantic Ocean. During Roman times it may well have been an island. At the time of the Roman occupation of Portugal the richness of fish and salt in the estuary of the River Sado led to the creation of fish industries centred on Cetóbriga (now Setúbal) and the Tróia Peninsula, and the area became the most important in the Roman Empire for fish processing, with salted and pickled fish and fish sauces being traded throughout the Empire in specially designed amphorae. The Roman ruins of Creiro on the right bank of the Sado is another site where processing was carried out.

== The site ==
The archaeological site of Tróia conserves structures from the 1st to the 6th century CE. Together with residential areas intended for workers and factory owners, 25 different workshops have been identified, with a total of 182 square processing tanks. The largest workshop was over 1,000 m² and grouped 19 tanks, while the smallest was 135 m² and had 9 tanks. Items found within the complex include dolia and amphorae as well as terra sigillata pottery.

In addition to the commercial buildings, archaeologists have identified thermal baths, which occupied an area of 450 m². They included an apodyterium, a frigidarium, a tepidarium, and a caldarium with an underground heating system, as well as swimming pools and an exercise room. The complex also had four burial zones, including a mausoleum, with a columbarium made up of niches in the walls that were designed to hold urns containing the ashes of the dead. There is also evidence of graves, assumed to be Christian, from the second half of the 5th century CE. There was also a paleochristian basilica from the late 4th century or early 5th century, built on top of an abandoned workshop. A marble relief dedicated to Mithra discovered in this basilica seems to indicate that it was pre-Christian. This range of funerary contexts highlights the long duration of the occupation of this area, as well as the profound religious transformations experienced during the period.

== Archaeological investigations ==
The ruins at Tróia were mentioned in documents from the 16th century but it appears that no excavations were carried out until the 18th century when studies were led by Queen D. Maria I when she was still a princess. In 1850 the excavations gained new impetus with the creation of the Lusitanian Archaeological Society, which carried out works in the Casas da Princesa (Houses of the Princess), where they found walls with paintings and floors with mosaics. More recently, several campaigns took place between 1948 and 1967, when the baths, salting houses, necropolis and the Paleochristian basilica were excavated. These were carried out by the Portuguese National Museum of Archaeology and by the Direção-Geral do Património Cultural. The most recent work has been funded by the company Tróia Resort, under the supervision of archaeologist Inês Vaz Pinto. The site is now close to a large beach resort area.
