= Grândola e Santa Margarida da Serra =

- Civil parish
- Location in Portugal
- Coordinates: 38.18°N 8.57°W
- Country: Portugal
- Region: Alentejo
- Intermunic. comm.: Alentejo Litoral
- District: Setúbal
- Municipality: Grândola

Area
  - Total: 416.25 km^{2} (160.72 sq mi)

Population (2011)
  - Total: 10,834
  - Density: 26/km^{2} (67/sq mi)
- Time zone: UTC+00:00 (WET)
  - Summer (DST): UTC+01:00 (WEST)

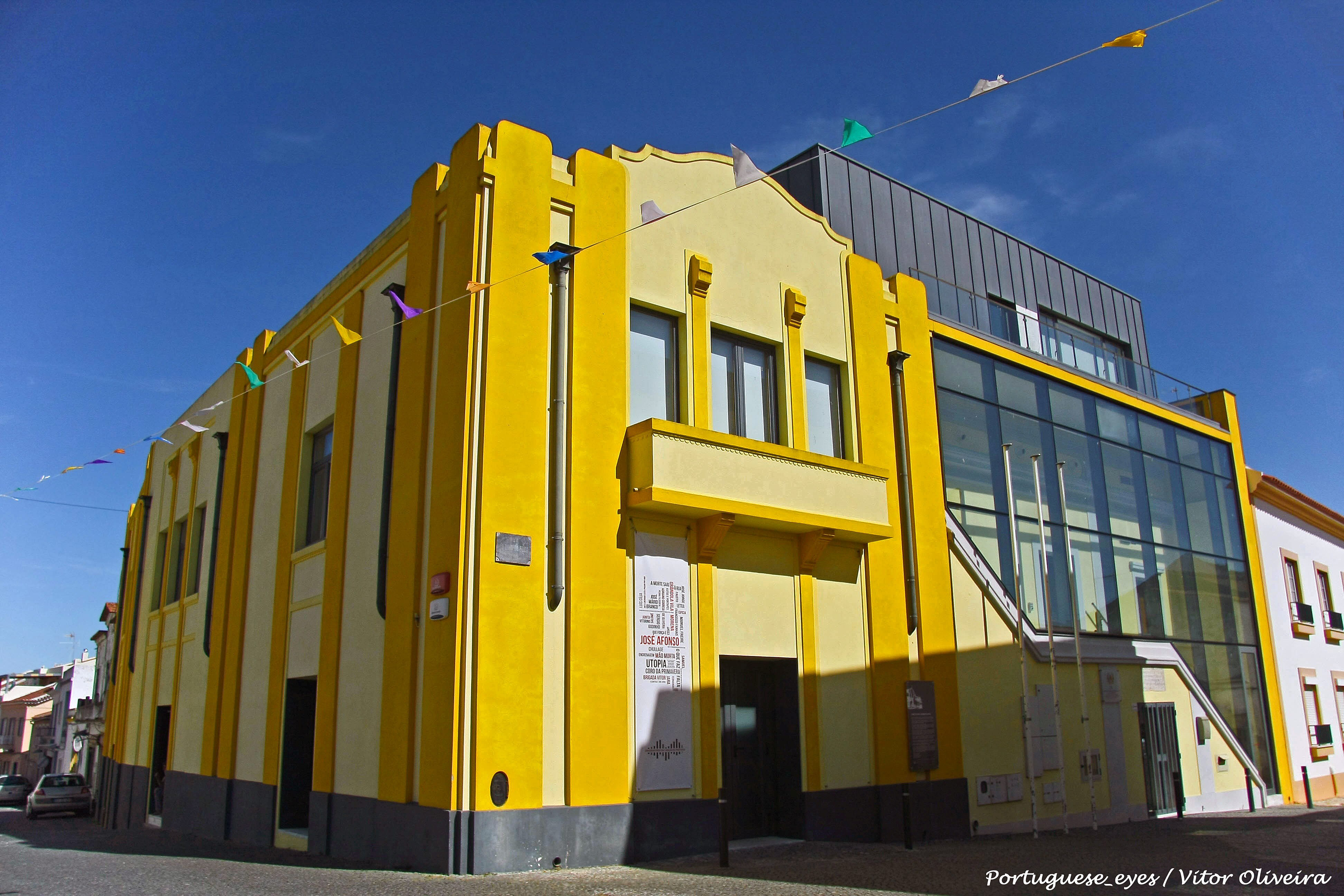
Cineteatro Grandolense - Grândola - Portugal

Grândola e Santa Margarida da Serra is a civil parish in the municipality of Grândola, Portugal. It was formed in 2013 by the merger of the former parishes Grândola and Santa Margarida da Serra. The population in 2011 was 10,834, in an area of 416.25 km^{2}.
