= Lousal mine =

Mine in Portugal

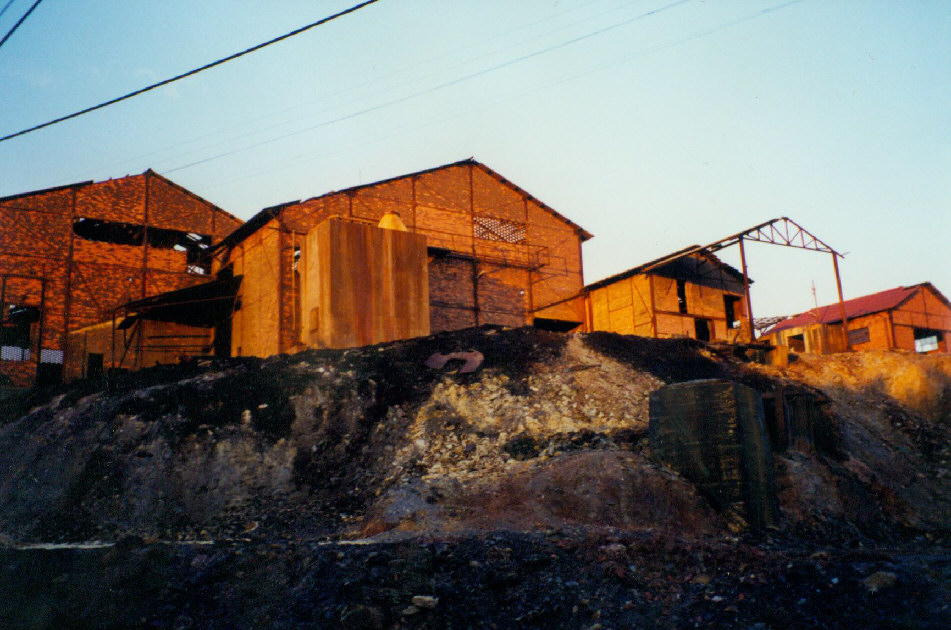

- Location in Portugal
- Location: Setúbal,Portugal; 38°02′05″N 008°25′32″W
- Products: pyrite
- Opened: 1900
- Closed: 1988

Lousal mine was a pyrite mine in Portugal. The mine was opened in 1900 and closed in 1988.
