= Gyrotonic =

Exercise method

- Industry: Physical fitness
- Founded: (1984)
- Founder: Juliu Horvath
- Key people: Juliu Horvath, Founder,
- Website: www.gyrotonic.com

Gyrotonic, also known as the Gyrotonic Expansion System, is a system of exercise that was developed by Juliu Horvath in the 1980s. It is centered around enhancing spinal movement in three dimensions. The system consists of two complementary exercise methods - the Gyrotonic and Gyrokinesis Methods.

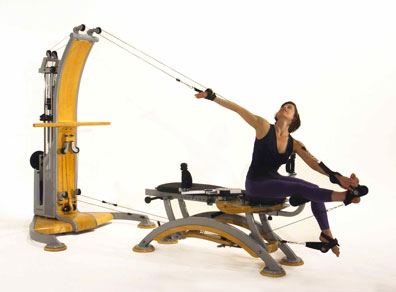
Gyrotonic Tower and Pulley

== History ==
The Gyrokinesis and Gyrotonic methods of exercise were developed by Juliu Horvath.

In New York City in the early 1980s, Horvath started sharing his exercise technique at Steps dance studio on Broadway, and in Central Park. First calling it the Julio Horvath Method, he later chose a combination of the Greek words for "circling" (Gyro) and "stretch" (Tonic).
