= Tróia Peninsula =

Peninsula in Portugal

Coordinates: 38°27′56″N 8°52′20″W

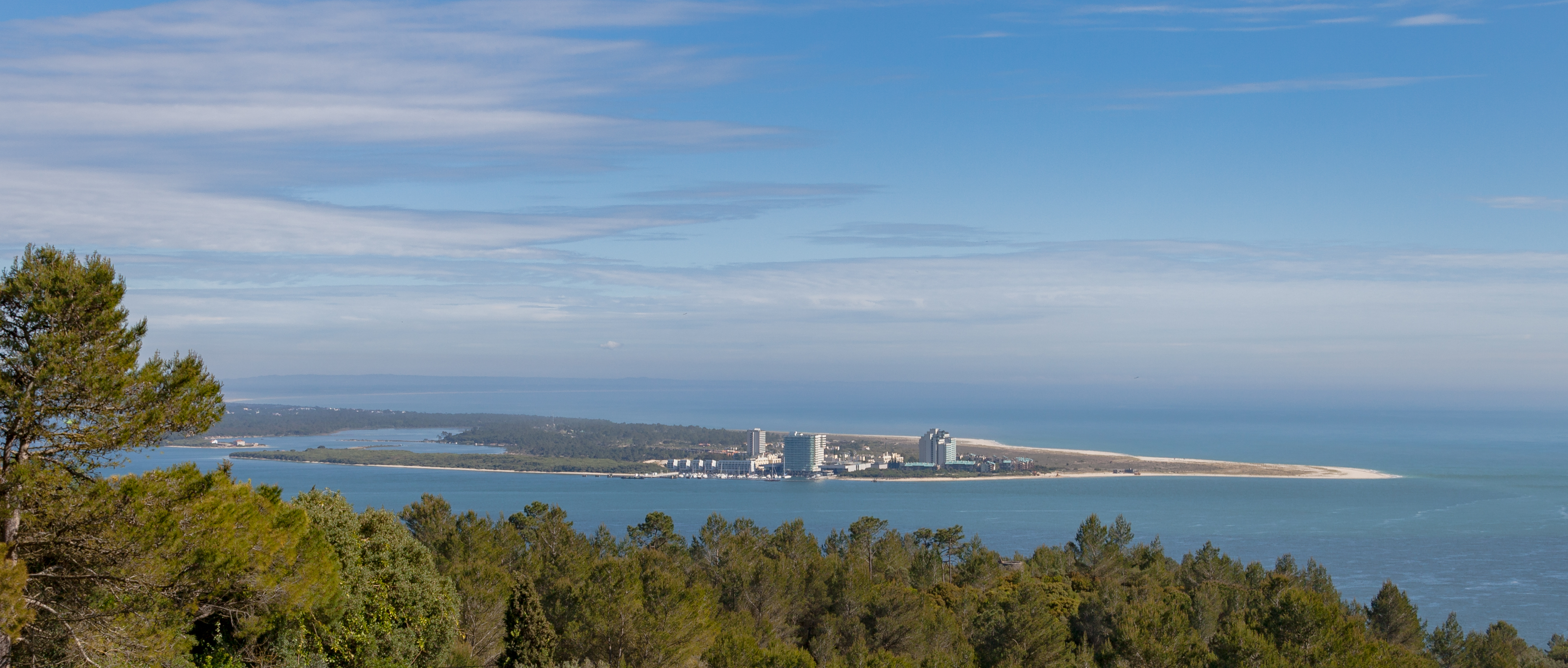
The Tróia Peninsula seen from Serra da Arrábida.

Tróia (Portuguese pronunciation: [ˈtɾɔjɐ]) is a peninsula located in Grândola Municipality (parish of Carvalhal), Portugal, next to the Sado River estuary. Tourism is the peninsula's main economic activity due to its long beaches facing the Atlantic. There is a ferry boat connection between the peninsula and the city of Setúbal. Tróia has important archaeological sites dating from the time when the peninsula was an island called Acalá, settled by the Romans.

== Getting there ==
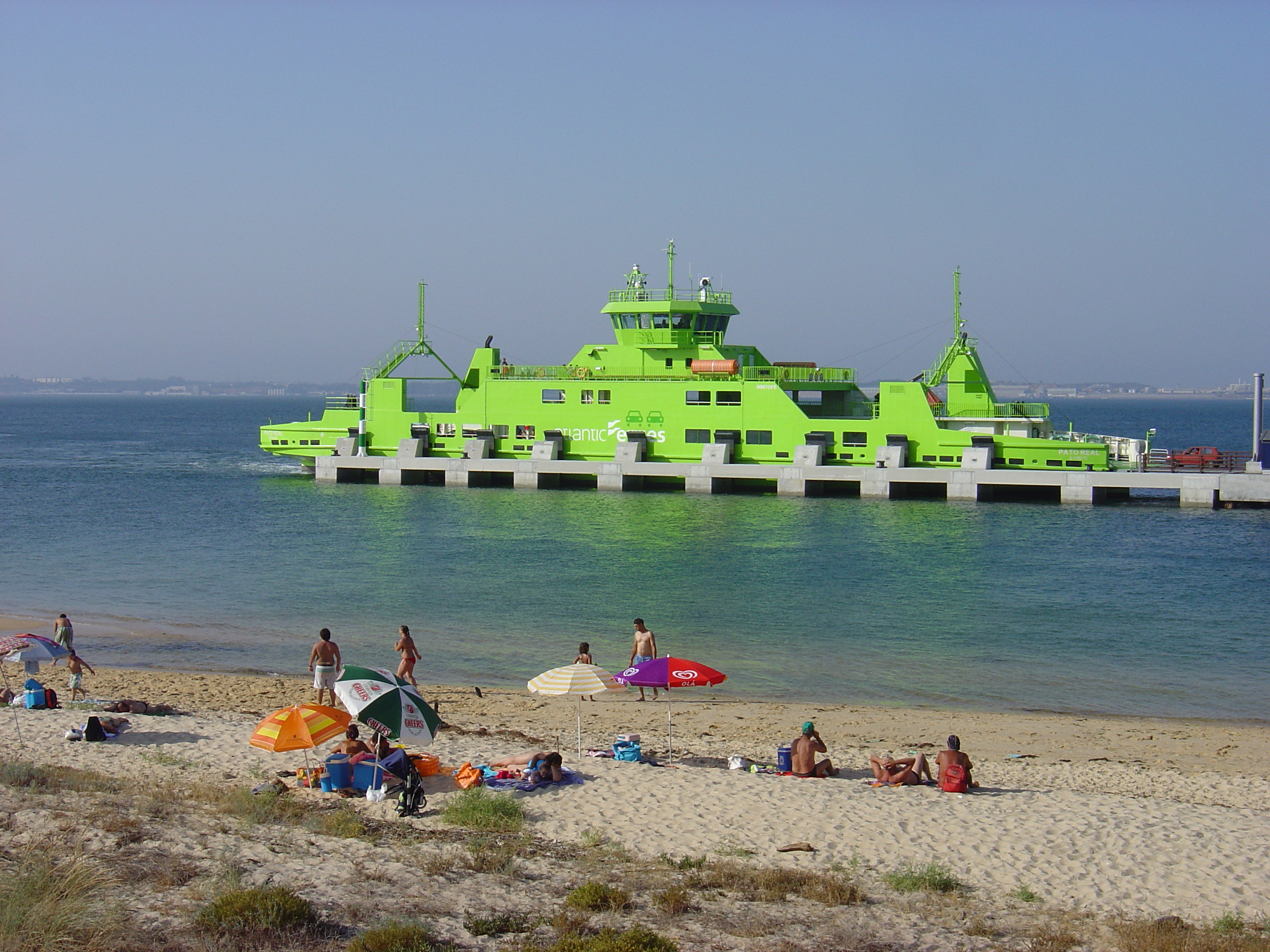
A ferry boat docked in front of a beach, in Tróia.

There are two ferries; one, a catamaran, carries only foot passengers from Setúbal to the point nearest the mainland; the other carries cars, bikes etc. to a point some 4 km south-east. It is located 45 minutes from Lisbon.

== Main attractions ==
The peninsula has a casino, many hotels, some restaurants, a swimming pool and white sand beaches facing the Atlantic Ocean. Here visitors can also find Roman ruins and the Porto Palafítico da carrasqueira.

=== Beaches in Troia ===
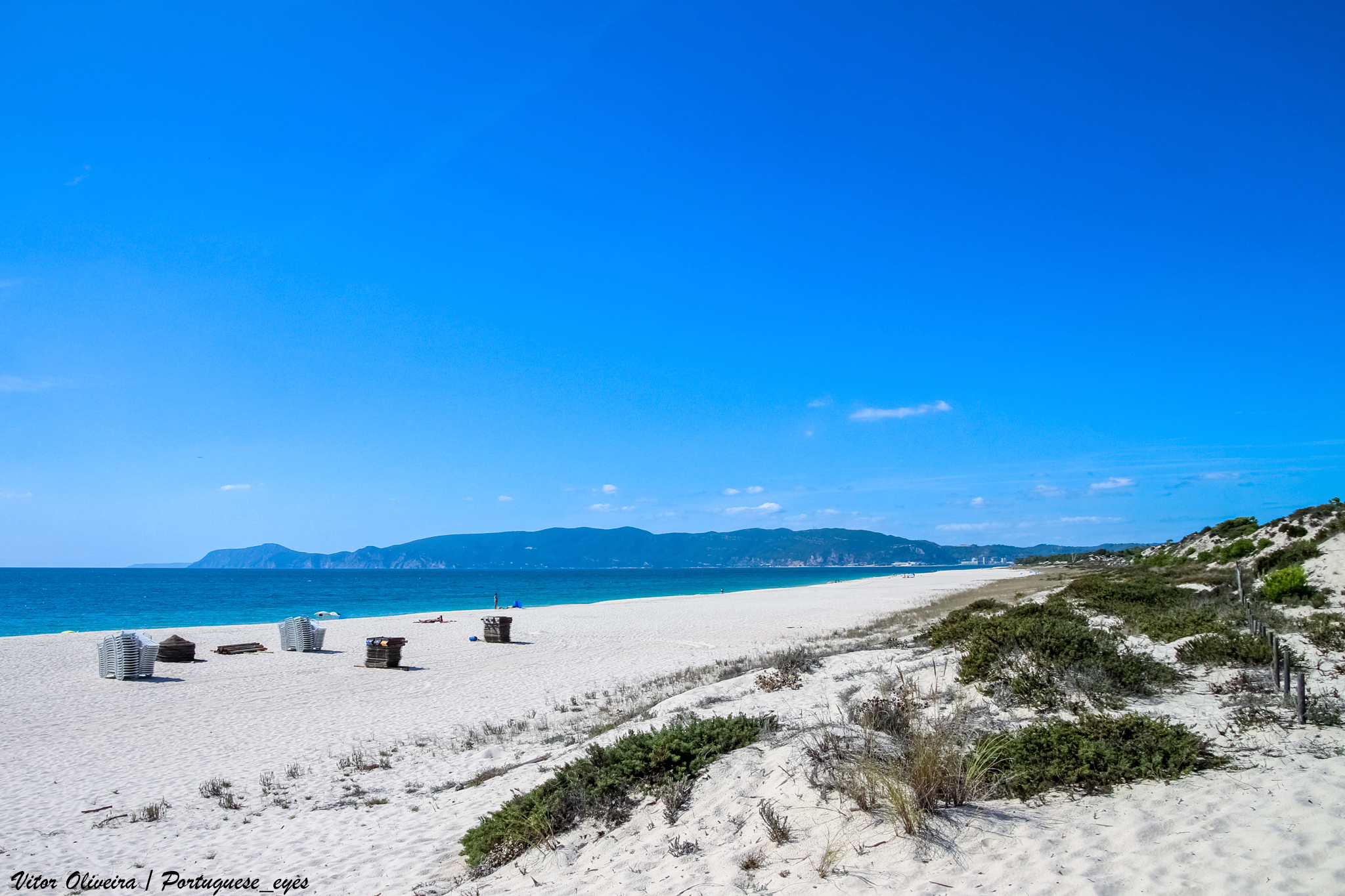
Atlantic beach at Tróia.

The beaches nearest to Setúbal are busy during summer months, especially at weekends. Raised walkways link these beaches to the harbour and marina areas, protecting the vulnerable dune flora. There are small cafés on the beaches and larger ones around the marina near the foot-passenger ferry.

There are beaches both facing the Atlantic (west) as well as the Sado River (east).

=== Marina of Troia ===
In the Marina of Troia, it is possible to board a boat and watch the dolphins that are present in the area. In the summer visitors can dive and swim with these animals.

=== Roman ruins ===
The Roman ruins of Tróia are a place that was occupied until the 6th century. Here the ancient people took advantage of the abundance of fish and salt in this area. Nowadays it is possible to observe the ruins of the thermal baths with the rooms for hot and cold baths, the houses with 2 floors and necropolis of several kinds of graves.

=== Porto palafítico ===
The Porto palafítico is a unique harbor that was built in the 20th century. Resting on wood pillars driven into the mud, this harbor seems to move from the margin and moving inside the river.

The sea around the Tróia peninsula is also home to a school of bottlenose dolphins; boats from the marina and from Setúbal offer ½-day trips for dolphin-sighting.
