= A Barraca =

Portuguese theatre company

Coordinates: 38.7070°N 9.1553°W

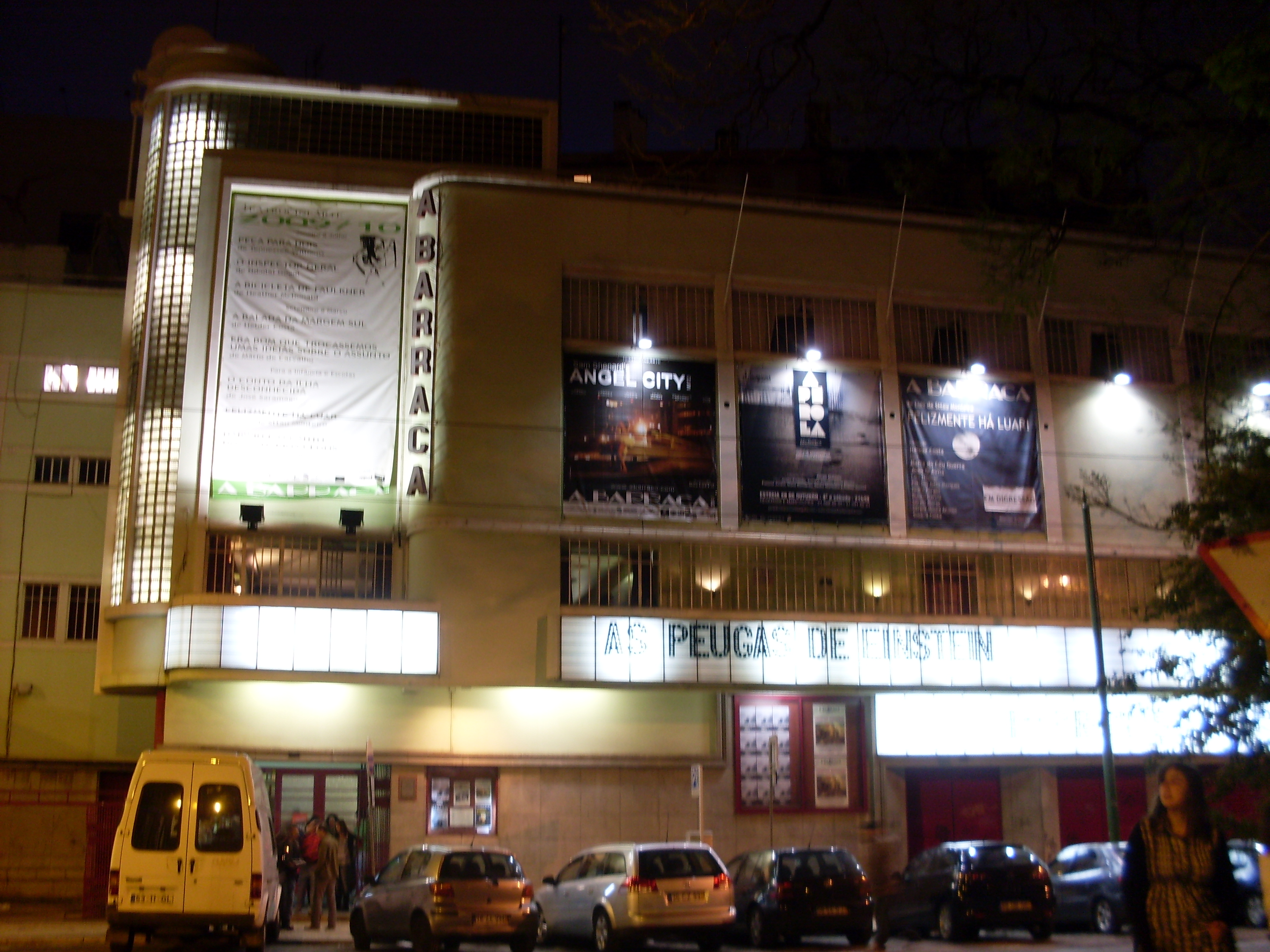
Teatro Cinearte, base of the theatre company "A Barraca", during the play As Peúgas de Einstein, April 2011

A Barraca is a Portuguese theatre company founded 1975 and directed by Hélder Costa and leading actress Maria do Céu Guerra. It is based at the Teatro Cinearte on 2 Largo de Santos, Lisbon.

== History ==
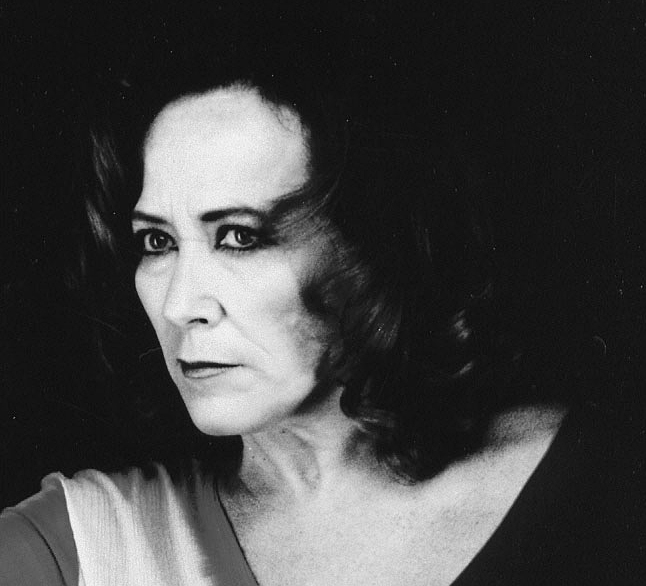
Maria do Céu Guerra (2007)

The company was founded in 1975 by actress and stage director Maria do Céu Guerra and director Mario Alberto. It belonged to an emerging movement of experimental independent theater companies located mainly in Lisbon. During 1976 the group spent most of its time touring the country. The Europa Year Book of 1983 listed it as one of the main Portuguese theater companies of the period following the Carnation Revolution of 25 April 1974. The group was described at the time as the most popular of the independent theater companies in Portugal.

Maria do Céu Guerra and stage director and playwright Hélder Costa have managed the company since its foundation. Costa has written, transcribed and staged many of the shows presented by the group. During his time of exile in Lisbon, the Brazilian playwright Augusto Boal participated in directing the company. He left a strong influence on the group's repertoire. The actor Mário Viegas first appeared with the company.

In 1976 the company moved to precarious facilities at the top of Rua Alexandre Herculano, near the Largo do Rato. In 1989 they were granted the Cinearte theater in Largo de Santos by the Lisbon City Council for a period of 25 years. The theater was also used as a cafe-concert space.

On 4 March 2011 the theater group celebrated 35 years with a party that feted two of the leading figures in its history, Augusto Boal and the actress Fernanda Alves. Rita Lello put on a special staging of the play Angel City by Sam Shepard.

== Theatrical productions ==
The theatrical productions of A Barraca are mainly adaptations of historical and political subjects to the popular, traditional and modern format of narrative theater. The company has a special focus on national production, due to the subsidies allocated to it by the state.

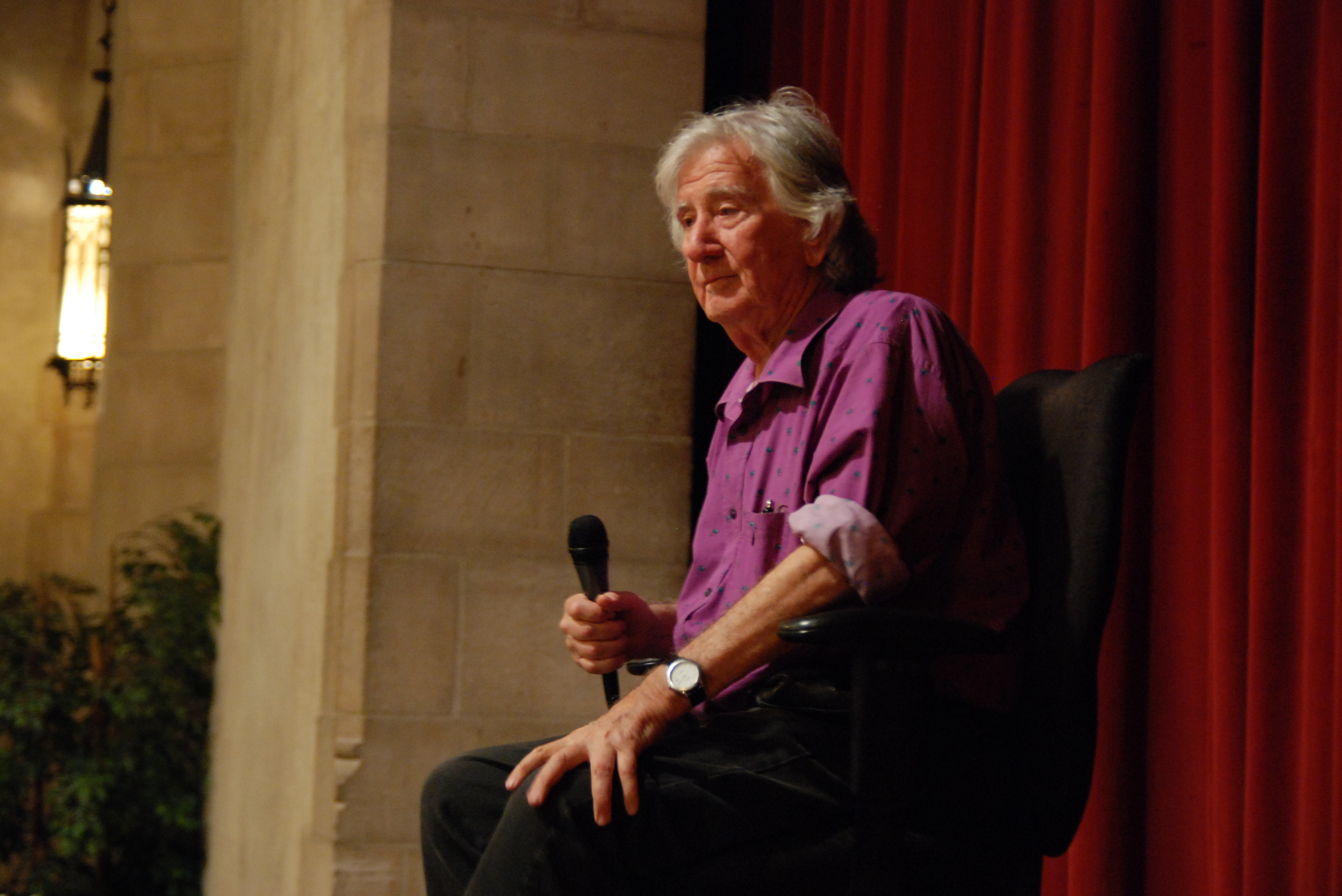
Augusto Boal

A Barraca debuted in March 1976 in the Incrível Almadense theater with Cidade Dourada (Golden City) by La Candelária. This was a great success. In September of that year it mounted the show Histórias de fidalgotes e alcoviteiras (Stories of Squires and Pimps) staged by Hélder Costa and based on scripts by Gil Vicente and Ruzante. In 1977 it presented the show Ao qu'isto chegou! - Feira portuguesa de opinião, including the drama A Lei É a Lei (The Law is the Law) by Luiz Francisco Rebello. When Augusto Boal was with the company in 1977–78 he directed three plays including Barraca conta Tiradentes (1977). In 1978 the company presented the piece José do Telhado about the famous Portuguese villain José do Telhado, with musical arrangements by Zeca Afonso. The music was released in 1979 as the album Fura, Fura.

A Barraca produced some of its greatest successes in the 1980s. In 1980 it presented É menino ou menina? (Is it a boy or girl?), a collage of pieces by Gil Vicente arranged by Maria do Céu Guerra and directed by Helder Costa. The company made an interesting contribution to the history of representations of works by Gil Vicente. In the same year the group first visited Brazil. It showed Preto no branco, a version of Accidental Death of an Anarchist by Dario Fo. The repertoire also included D. João VI by Hélder Costa. Mário Viegas played the sovereign and caused much amusement by his interpretation of the king as a chicken eater, who walked around with pieces of poultry in his pockets.

The group was described as a "large international theater company" during its limited engagement in Rio de Janeiro. In 1983 the company presented Um dia na capital do Império (One day in the capital of the Empire), with a script by António Ribeiro Chiado and staging by Hélder Costa. In 1984 A Barraca produced Santa Joana dos Matadouros (Saint Joan of the Stockyards) by Bertolt Brecht, considered one of the greatest successes of the company, and in 1986 produced Calamity Janes, with a highly acclaimed interpretation by Maria do Céu Guerra.

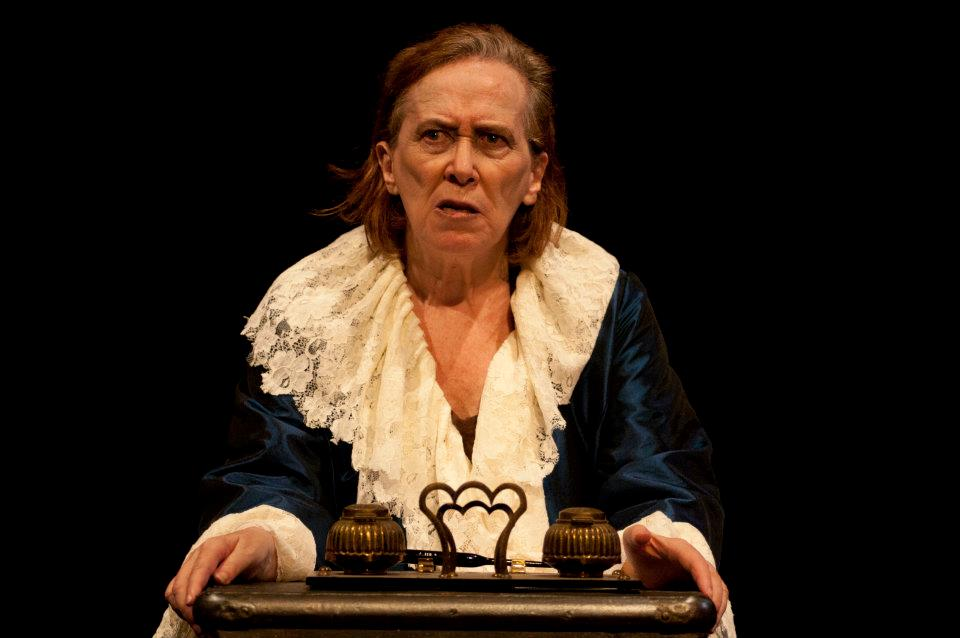
Maria do Céu Guerra in D. Maria, a Louca

In September 2010 A Barraca was asked to re-enact the play O Mistério da Camioneta Fantasma (The Mystery of the Phantom Coach) as part of the official program for the Centenary Celebration of the Republic. On 20 July 2011 the group debuted the production D. Maria, a Louca (Maria the Mad), with script by the Brazilian author António Cunha and staging by Maria do Céu Guerra. On 10 April 2013 the A Barraca company debuted Menino de Sua Avó (His Grandmother's Boy), an unpublished text by the playwright Armando Nascimento Rosa, a creation of Maria do Céu Guerra and Adérito Lopes. This production was included in the closing celebrations of the Year of Portugal in Brazil, performed in the Teatro Dulcina in Rio de Janeiro on 3, 4 and 5 May 2013 .

== Presentations ==
Many of the productions of the company have been Hélder Costa's own plays:

- Zé do Telhado
- Príncipe de Spandau
- D. João VI
- Damião de Góis
- As Peúgas de Einstein

== Sources ==
- Alves dos Reis, Carlos António (2005). História crítica da literatura portuguesa: Do neo-realismo ao post-modernismo. Vol. 9. Verbo. ISBN 9789722224734.
- Brilhante, Maria João (2006). "Gil Vicente: Poet and Artist of the Portuguese Golden Age". Western European Stages. 18 (1).
- Guimarães, Carmelinda (1988). "1988.Bom Para o Teatro Brasileiro". Diógenes. 4. Grupo Editor Latinoamericano. ISBN 9789506941062.
- Lobo, Eulália Maria Lahmeyer (2001). Imigração portuguesa no Brasil. Estudos históricos. Vol. 43. Hucitec. ISBN 9788527105668.
- Moser, Fernando de Mello; Martins, José V. de Pina (1994). Discurso inacabado: Ensaios de cultura portuguesa. Fundação Calouste Gulbenkian.
- Peixoto, Fernando (1985). Teatro em movimento (3 ed.). Editora Hucitec em convênio com a Secretaria de Estado da Cultura.
- Pestana, Sebastião (1993). "Duas Montagens do Teatro de Gil Vicente: "O Natal nos Autos de Devoção" e "É Menino ou Menina"". Anais. 34. Academia Portuguesa da História. ISBN 972-624-096-4.
- Rebello, Luiz Francisco (1987). Grande Enciclopédia Portuguesa e Brasileira. Vol. 10. Editorial Enciclopédia. p. 33.
- Rebello, Luiz Francisco (1988). Colecção Saber: História do teatro português. Vol. 78 (4 ed.). Europa-América.
- Rebello, Luiz Francisco (1991). História do teatro. Comissariado para a Europália 91-Portugal.
- Rodrigues, Maria Idalina Resina (1987). Estudos ibéricos da cultura à literatura: pontos de encontro, séculos XIII a XVII. Instituto de Cultura e Língua Portuguesa, Ministério da Educação.
- Torres, Antônio (1996). Centro: das nossas desatenções. Cantos do Rio. Vol. 2. Relume Dumará. ISBN 9788573160833.
- Van Maanen, H.; Wilmer, S.E. (1998). Theatre Worlds in Motion: Structures, Politics and Developments in the Countries of Western Europe. Rodopi. ISBN 9789042005549.
- Vasques, Eugénia (2001). Colibri História: Mulheres que escreveram teatro no século XX em Portugal. Vol. 29. Colibri.
