= Oeiras =

Oeiras may refer to:

== Places ==
=== Brazil ===
- Oeiras, Piauí, a municipality in the State of Piauí
- Oeiras do Pará, a municipality in the State of Pará

=== Portugal ===
- Oeiras, Portugal, a municipality in the district of Lisbon
- Oeiras e São Julião da Barra, a former civil parish in the municipality of Oeiras
- Oeiras e São Julião da Barra, Paço de Arcos e Caxias, successor of the above
