= João Moutinho =

Portuguese footballer (born 1986)

João Moutinho ComM
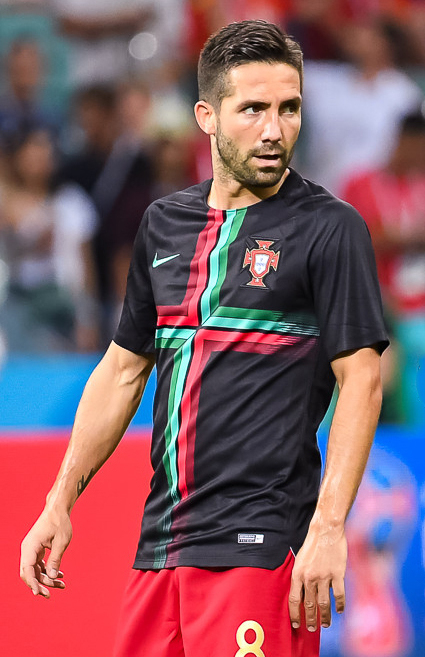
- Moutinho with Portugal at the 2018 FIFA World Cup

Personal information
- Full name: João Filipe Iria Santos Moutinho
- Date of birth: 8 September 1986 (age 40)
- Place of birth: Barreiro, Portugal
- Height: 1.70 m (5 ft 7 in)
- Position: Midfielder

Team information
- Current team: Braga
- Number: 8

Youth career
- 1996-2000: Portimonense
- 2000–2004: Sporting CP

Senior career*
Years	Team	Apps	(Gls)
2003–2004	Sporting CP B	30	(1)
2004–2010	Sporting CP	163	(21)
2010–2013	Porto	83	(4)
2013–2018	Monaco	158	(9)
2018–2023	Wolverhampton Wanderers	175	(5)
2023–	Braga	94	(3)

International career
2003	Portugal U17	15	(0)
2004	Portugal U18	5	(0)
2004	Portugal U19	4	(1)
2005–2007	Portugal U21	17	(2)
2006	Portugal B	1	(0)
2005–2022	Portugal	146	(7)
Medal record
Men's football
Representing Portugal
UEFA European Championship
Winner	2016 France	Team
Bronze medal – third place	2012 Poland-Ukraine	Team
UEFA Nations League
Winner	2019 Portugal	Team
FIFA Confederations Cup
Third place	2017 Russia	Team
UEFA European U17 Championship
Winner	2003 Portugal
- * Club domestic league appearances and goals as of 23:45, 8 November 2026 (UTC)

João Filipe Iria Santos Moutinho ComM (European Portuguese: [ʒuˈɐ̃w fɨˈlipiˈɾi.ɐ ˈsɐ̃tuʒ moˈtĩɲu, ˈʒwɐ̃w -]; born 8 September 1986) is a Portuguese footballer who plays as a central midfielder for Primeira Liga club Braga.

Moutinho began his professional career with Sporting CP, moving in 2010 to Porto and winning twelve major titles between the two clubs combined. Three years later, he transferred to Monaco for €25 million, conquering the Ligue 1 championship in the 2016–17 season; in 2018, he joined Wolverhampton Wanderers, playing 212 total games before being released in 2023 and joining Braga.

Moutinho represented the Portugal national team at four European Championships, one UEFA Nations League finals and two FIFA World Cups, winning the 2016 and 2019 editions of each of the former two tournaments respectively.

He is also one of the few players to have ever passed 1,150 games in competitive matches.

== Club career ==
=== Sporting ===
Moutinho was born in Barreiro, Setúbal District, but his birth was registered in Portimão, Algarve, where he grew up. After showing great promise as a boy playing for Portimonense, he signed with Sporting CP in Lisbon when he turned 13 to continue his football education.

During the 2004–05 pre-season, at only 17 years of age, Moutinho was called by manager José Peseiro to the main squad. However, he then returned to the junior team coached by Paulo Bento and featured alongside such players such as Miguel Veloso and Nani, helping the side win the national title that season.

In the beginning of 2005, Moutinho was called up for a Taça de Portugal match, eventually playing 20 minutes against Pampilhosa, and made his Primeira Liga debut on 23 January, staying in the entire 3–0 win at Gil Vicente and wearing the number 28 shirt previously worn by Cristiano Ronaldo. Based on consistent displays, he wasted no time in establishing himself as a regular while being able to play in any position across a flat midfield or in a diamond formation; his box-to-box dynamism and determination quickly made him a firm fan favourite, as he rarely missed a game since becoming first-choice.

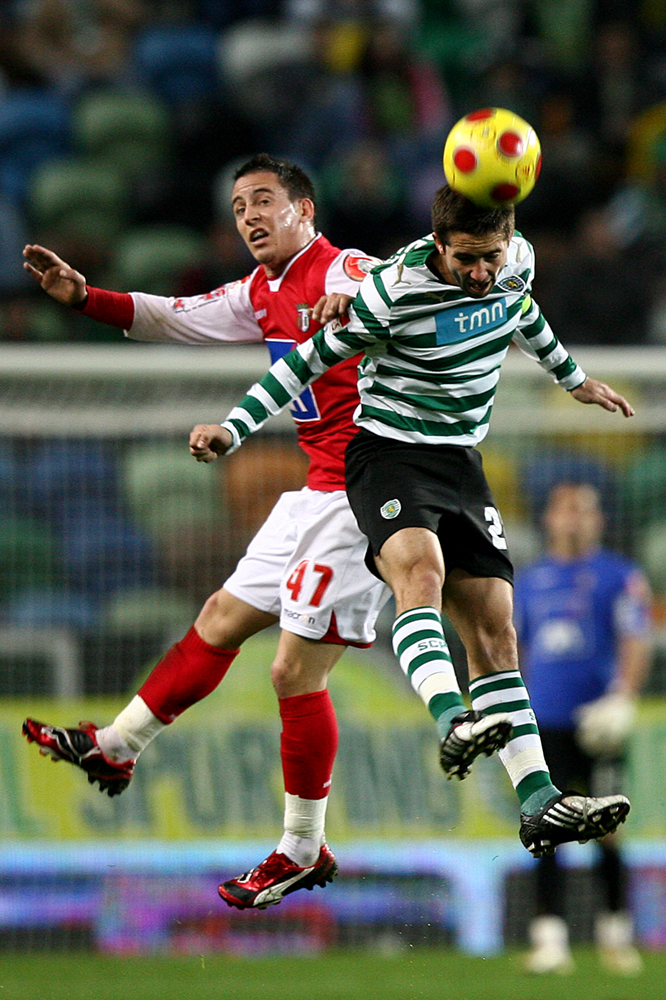
Moutinho (right) battling João Pereira in 2009

Moutinho's performances in the closing stages of the campaign, especially in the UEFA Cup with player of the match displays against Feyenoord and Newcastle United that helped the Lions reach the final of the competition, made him an automatic starter despite his young age; he contributed with 15 league games as his team finished second and, during the summer, he agreed to a one-year extension.

In his first full season, Moutinho's further progress and exceptional consistency (he was the only player to play every minute of every match in the domestic league) was one of the brightest spots in Sporting's runner-up final place. Incidentally, he scored his team's final goal of the campaign, a 1–0 win over Braga to ensure a return to UEFA Champions League football for the Lisbon side.

In 2006–07, following the departure of veteran Ricardo Sá Pinto, Moutinho was made vice-captain at just 19 years of age. The following season, after Custódio and Ricardo also left, he would be named captain, the second youngest in the history of the club's professional football, behind first captain and associate founder Francisco Stromp.

In 2008–09, after an aborted deal with Premier League club Everton, Moutinho was again ever present, only missing three league matches (43 overall appearances) as Sporting finished once again runners-up; he also had the dubious distinction of netting his side's only goal in the Champions League round of 16 clash against Bayern Munich, a 1–12 aggregate loss.

=== Porto ===
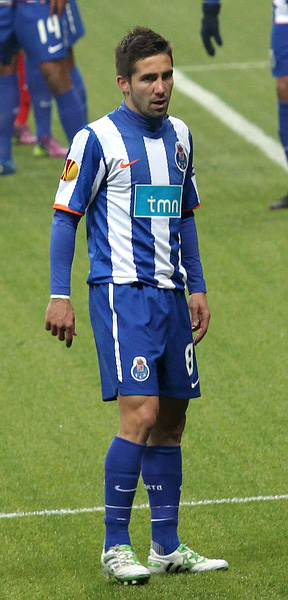
Moutinho playing for Porto in 2011

On 3 July 2010, Moutinho signed a five-year contract with rivals Porto, with the transfer price reaching €11 million (€1 million being paid for 50% of the rights to central defender Nuno André Coelho); additionally, Sporting would receive 25% of any added value (Portuguese: mais valia) occurring during that time frame, provided it surpassed the previous value. Sporting Chairman José Eduardo Bettencourt described Moutinho's conduct as deplorable and called him a "rotten apple", adding: "The deal was done because Sporting wanted it, because it did not want a rotten apple in its orchard, and it did not want someone who was not an example, nor dignified the flag of the club." Soon after, Porto sold 37.5% of the player's economic rights to a third party, Mamers BV, for €4,125,000.

Moutinho was an ever-present figure for Porto in his first season. He appeared in 50 official games as the northerners won the league and, even though he did not score in league competition, he netted twice in the campaign's Portuguese Cup, most notably in a 3–1 away win against Benfica, with his team overcoming the 0–2 home loss in the first leg to reach the final, in which the player also appeared, against Vitória de Guimarães (6–2); he added another 90 minutes in the final of the Europa League, and the club won the treble.

On 3 August 2011, Porto partnered with Soccer Invest Fund to buy back 37.5% of Moutinho's economic rights. The private investment fund acquired 15% after the overall transactions, while Porto recouped 22.5% for €4 million; the residual 15% was acquired by Porto in 2013, for €3.3 million.

On 19 February 2013, Moutinho scored to help his team to a 1–0 home win over Málaga for the Champions League round of 16, netting from close range after an Alex Sandro cross (eventual 2–1 aggregate loss). He made 43 appearances during the campaign all competitions comprised (five goals, 3,515 minutes of action), as both team and player won their third consecutive league championship.

=== Monaco ===
On 24 May 2013, it was announced that Moutinho had joined Monaco alongside teammate James Rodríguez for a combined fee believed to be around €70 million (€25 million for Moutinho). He made his official debut for his new club on 1 September, starting and setting up both goals in a 2–1 win at Marseille which put them top of Ligue 1. Moutinho was first-choice in his debut campaign, as the principality team finished runners-up straight out of Ligue 2. His only goal was an equaliser in a 1–1 away draw to Reims, on 29 September. On 16 September 2014, in Monaco's first Champions League match since 2005, Moutinho scored the only goal in a home defeat of Bayer Leverkusen. He finished the season with 52 overall appearances, in an eventual third-place finish for the Leonardo Jardim-led side. Moutinho contributed with two goals from 31 matches during 2016–17, helping the club to the eighth national championship of its history.

=== Wolverhampton Wanderers ===
On 24 July 2018, Moutinho joined newly-promoted English club Wolverhampton Wanderers on a two-year deal for an undisclosed fee, reported to be around £5 million. He made his Premier League debut on 11 August, featuring 85 minutes in a 2–2 home draw against Everton. His first goal in the competition arrived on 22 September, when he scored from just outside the box with his weaker left foot in a 1–1 draw away to Manchester United. Wolverhampton fans voted Moutinho as Player of the Season at the conclusion of his first campaign. He played all thirty-eight league fixtures in the process, adding six appearances in their run to the semi-final in the FA Cup, the first since 1997–98.

On 23 November 2019, shortly after Moutinho had scored his team's opening goal in a 2–1 league win away to AFC Bournemouth, his second in the competition, it was announced that he had signed a new contract with the club keeping him at Molineux until 2022. On 12 December the following year, he was sent off for a second yellow card in a 0–1 home loss to West Midlands neighbours Aston Villa; it was his first red card in 859 career matches. He scored his first goal at Molineux, and the third of his Wolves career, from 30 yards against Arsenal in a 2–1 win on 2 February 2021, as his team did the double over the North London side in that season for the first time since 1978–79.

Moutinho scored the only goal in a win over Manchester United on 3 January 2022, sealing Wolves' first league victory at Old Trafford since 1980. In the next away game 19 days later, he scored again in a 2–1 win over Brentford to score more than once in a season for the first time in his Wolves career. Although his contract expired that 1 July, he signed a new one-year deal three days later.

On 2 June 2023, it was announced that Moutinho would leave Wolves upon the expiry of his contract, bringing an end to his 5 year spell with the club. The player's last appearance for Wolves came as a late substitute in a 1–0 home win against Aston Villa on 6 May 2023; it was his 175th appearance in the Premier League, and his 212th in total for Wolverhampton Wanderers.

=== Braga ===
On 25 August 2023, after being close to a return to his former club Porto, Moutinho signed a one-year contract with Braga. Nine days later, he made his debut, coming off the bench during the final minutes of a 2–2 league draw at home to his former club Sporting CP, marking his return to Primeira Liga pitches after ten years abroad. On 22 December, Moutinho scored his first goal for Braga through a penalty kick top open the scoring in a 3–1 away victory over Nacional in the Taça da Liga.

On 14 January 2024, Moutinho made his 1000th career appearance in official matches in a 2–0 league loss to Porto at the Estádio do Dragão. Two weeks later, on 27 January, he played the full 120 minutes of the 2024 Taça da Liga final against Estoril and converted his penalty in an eventual shoot-out victory, his first-ever trophy in the competition, having previously lost the 2008 final. Following a 4–3 win over Casa Pia on 5 May 2024, Moutinho reached the mark of 800 unbeaten matches in the top level football (583 wins and 217 draws).

== International career ==
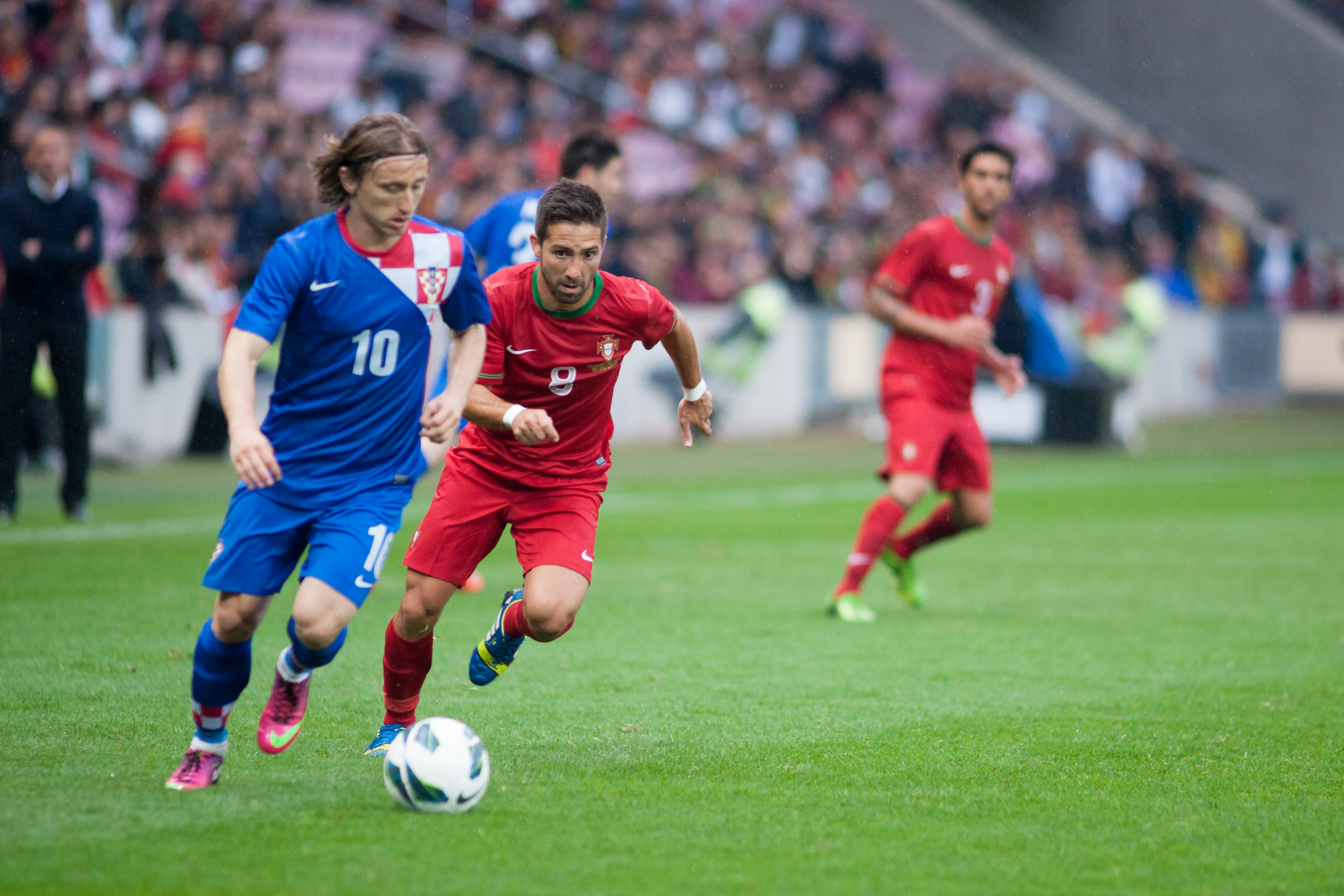
Croatia's Luka Modrić and Moutinho in an international friendly in June 2013

A full Portugal international at the age of 18, Moutinho made his debut on 17 August 2005 in a 2–0 home friendly win against Egypt in Ponta Delgada. Ever since the 2006 FIFA World Cup, he became a regular call-up.

On 31 May 2008, Moutinho registered his first goal for the national team in a 2–0 friendly victory over Georgia at Estádio do Fontelo in Viseu. He was picked for the squad-of-23 for UEFA Euro 2008 and, in the opening game, assisted on a goal by Raul Meireles in a 2–0 victory over Turkey.

Moutinho also played in two UEFA European Under-21 Championships, scoring against Germany in the 2006 edition, played on home soil, as the Portuguese exited in the group stage on both occasions; additionally, although not part of the provisional 24-player list for the 2010 World Cup in South Africa, he was named in a backup list of six players.

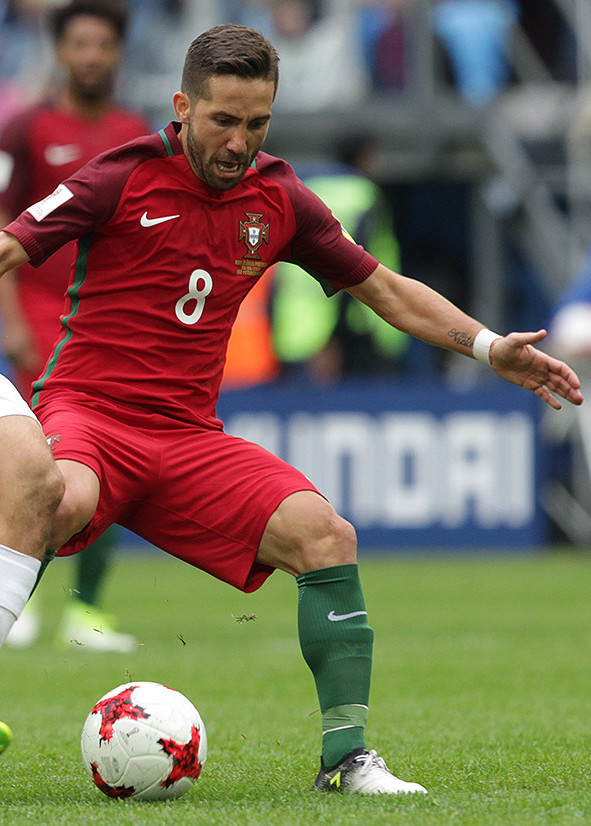
Moutinho winning his 100th cap, against New Zealand in the 2017 FIFA Confederations Cup.

Moutinho played all the games and minutes at the Euro 2012 tournament. In the semi-finals against Spain, he missed his penalty shootout attempt in an eventual 2–4 loss (0–0 after 120 minutes).

Moutinho was selected by former Sporting boss Bento for the 2014 World Cup, making his debut in the tournament on 16 June in a 0–4 group stage defeat to Germany. On 8 October 2015, he scored the only goal as Portugal defeated Denmark at the Estádio Municipal de Braga to seal qualification for Euro 2016, and three days later was also on the scoresheet in a 2–1 win away to Serbia which confirmed his team's position as group winners.

After six appearances out of a possible seven to help his nation win the European Championships for the first time ever, he gave the assist to eder to score the winner. Moutinho was also picked for the 2017 FIFA Confederations Cup squad by Fernando Santos. In the latter competition, in the final group stage game in Saint Petersburg, he won his 100th cap by playing the full 90 minutes in the 4–0 defeat of New Zealand.

Moutinho was included in the 2018 World Cup squad. On 2 June, in a pre-tournament goalless friendly draw away to Belgium, he captained the side for the first time.

On 14 November 2020, in a home defeat to France, Moutinho gained his 128th cap, surpassing Luís Figo to become the second most capped Portuguese player of all time, only behind teammate and captain Cristiano Ronaldo. He was named in the final squad for the delayed UEFA Euro 2020 tournament.

In October 2022, he was named in Portugal's preliminary 55-man squad for the 2022 FIFA World Cup in Qatar. However, he did not make the final cut.

== Personal life ==
Moutinho's father, Nélson, was also a footballer. A forward, he played for several clubs during a 15-year senior career. Moutinho's cousin, Hugo, also played the sport professionally. Alongside his native Portuguese, Moutinho also speaks English and French, being proficient in the former already upon arrival in England.

== Career statistics ==
=== Club ===
As of match played 21 November 2026

Appearances and goals by club, season and competition
Club	Season	League			National cup (Note: Includes Taça de Portugal, Coupe de France, FA Cup)		League cup (Note: Includes Taça da Liga, Coupe de la Ligue, EFL Cup)		Europe		Other		Total	
Club	Season	Division	Apps	Goals	Apps	Goals	Apps	Goals	Apps	Goals	Apps	Goals	Apps	Goals
Sporting CP B	2003–04	Segunda Divisão	30	1	—		—		—		—		30	1
Sporting CP	2004–05	Primeira Liga	15	0	2	0	—		9 (Note: Appearances in UEFA Cup)	0	—		26	0
Sporting CP	2005–06	Primeira Liga	34	4	5	1	—		4 (Note: Two appearances in UEFA Champions League, two appearances in UEFA Cup)	0	—		43	5
Sporting CP	2006–07	Primeira Liga	29	4	6	3	—		6 (Note: Appearances in UEFA Champions League)	0	—		41	7
Sporting CP	2007–08	Primeira Liga	30	5	6	1	7	0	12 (Note: Six appearances in UEFA Champions League, six appearances in UEFA Cup)	1	1 (Note: Appearance in Supertaça Cândido de Oliveira)	0	56	7
Sporting CP	2008–09	Primeira Liga	27	3	2	0	5	0	8	1	1	0	43	4
Sporting CP	2009–10	Primeira Liga	28	5	4	2	4	0	14 (Note: Four appearances in UEFA Champions League, 10 appearances in UEFA Cup)	2	—		50	9
Sporting CP	Total		163	21	25	7	16	0	53	4	2	0	259	32
Porto	2010–11	Primeira Liga	27	0	5	2	3	0	17 (Note: Appearances in UEFA Europa League)	0	1	0	53	2
Porto	2011–12	Primeira Liga	29	3	1	0	4	0	8 (Note: Six appearances in UEFA Champions League, two appearances in UEFA Europa League)	0	2 (Note: One appearance in UEFA Super Cup, one appearance in Supertaça Cândido de Oliveira)	0	44	3
Porto	2012–13	Primeira Liga	27	1	2	0	5	2	8	2	1	0	43	5
Porto	Total		83	4	8	2	12	2	33	2	4	0	140	10
Monaco	2013–14	Ligue 1	31	1	3	0	0	0	—		—		34	1
Monaco	2014–15	Ligue 1	37	4	3	0	2	0	10	1	—		52	5
Monaco	2015–16	Ligue 1	26	1	3	0	0	0	8 (Note: Two appearances in UEFA Champions League, six appearances in UEFA Europa League)	0	—		37	1
Monaco	2016–17	Ligue 1	31	2	4	0	4	1	13	0	—		52	3
Monaco	2017–18	Ligue 1	33	1	1	0	4	0	6	0	0	0	44	1
Monaco	Total		158	9	14	0	10	1	37	1	0	0	219	11
Wolverhampton Wanderers	2018–19	Premier League	38	1	6	0	0	0	—		—		44	1
Wolverhampton Wanderers	2019–20	Premier League	38	1	2	0	0	0	17	0	—		57	1
Wolverhampton Wanderers	2020–21	Premier League	33	1	3	0	0	0	—		—		36	1
Wolverhampton Wanderers	2021–22	Premier League	35	2	2	0	2	0	—		—		39	2
Wolverhampton Wanderers	2022–23	Premier League	31	0	1	0	4	0	—		—		36	0
Wolverhampton Wanderers	Total		175	5	14	0	6	0	17	0	—		212	5
Braga	2023–24	Primeira Liga	30	1	3	0	4	1	7 (Note: Five appearances in UEFA Champions League, two appearances and one goal in UEFA Europa League)	1	—		44	3
Braga	2024–25	Primeira Liga	22	1	4	1	1	0	9	0	—		36	2
Braga	2025–26	Primeira Liga	31	1	3	0	3	0	19	0	—		56	1
Braga	2026–27	Primeira Liga	11	0	1	0	1	0	9 (Note: Appearances in UEFA Conference League)	0	—		22	0
Braga	Total		94	3	11	1	9	1	44	1	—		158	6
Career total			703	43	72	10	53	4	184	8	6	0	1018	65

=== International ===
Appearances and goals by national team and year
National team	Year	Apps	Goals
Portugal	2005	3	0
Portugal	2006	2	0
Portugal	2007	6	0
Portugal	2008	11	1
Portugal	2009	3	0
Portugal	2010	5	0
Portugal	2011	10	1
Portugal	2012	14	0
Portugal	2013	11	0
Portugal	2014	11	0
Portugal	2015	5	2
Portugal	2016	13	1
Portugal	2017	11	2
Portugal	2018	8	0
Portugal	2019	8	0
Portugal	2020	8	0
Portugal	2021	13	0
Portugal	2022	4	0
Total		146	7

As of match played 9 June 2022.

List of international goals scored by João Moutinho
No.	Date	Venue	Opponent	Score	Result	Competition
1	31 May 2008	Estádio do Fontelo, Viseu, Portugal	Georgia	1–0	2–0	Friendly
2	7 October 2011	Estádio do Dragão, Porto, Portugal	Iceland	4–2	5–3	UEFA Euro 2012 qualifying
3	8 October 2015	Estádio Municipal, Braga, Portugal	Denmark	1–0	1–0	UEFA Euro 2016 qualifying
4	11 October 2015	Partizan Stadium, Belgrade, Serbia	Serbia	2–1	2–1	UEFA Euro 2016 qualifying
5	10 October 2016	Tórsvøllur, Tórshavn, Faroe Islands	Faroe Islands	5–0	6–0	2018 FIFA World Cup qualification
6	3 June 2017	António Coimbra da Mota, Estoril, Portugal	Cyprus	1–0	4–0	Friendly
7	3 June 2017	António Coimbra da Mota, Estoril, Portugal	Cyprus	2–0	4–0	Friendly

== Honours ==
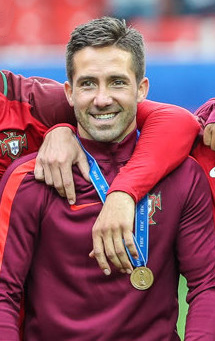
Moutinho with Portugal at the 2017 Confederations Cup

Sporting CP

- Taça de Portugal: 2006–07, 2007–08
- Supertaça Cândido de Oliveira: 2007, 2008

Porto

- Primeira Liga: 2010–11, 2011–12, 2012–13
- Taça de Portugal: 2010–11
- Supertaça Cândido de Oliveira: 2010, 2011, 2012
- UEFA Europa League: 2010–11

Monaco

- Ligue 1: 2016–17

Braga

- Taça da Liga: 2023–24

Portugal U17

- UEFA European Under-17 Championship: 2003

Portugal

- UEFA European Championship: 2016
- UEFA Nations League: 2018–19
- FIFA Confederations Cup third place: 2017

Individual

- SJPF Player of the Month: April 2005
- SJPF Young Player of the Month: October 2006, November 2006, October 2007, November 2007, February 2008, March 2008
- Porto Player of the Year: 2012–13
- Wolverhampton Wanderers' Player of the Season: 2018–19

Orders

- Commander of the Order of Merit

== See also ==
- List of men's footballers with 100 or more international caps
- List of men's footballers with the most official appearances
