= Salvem o surf =

Portuguese NGO

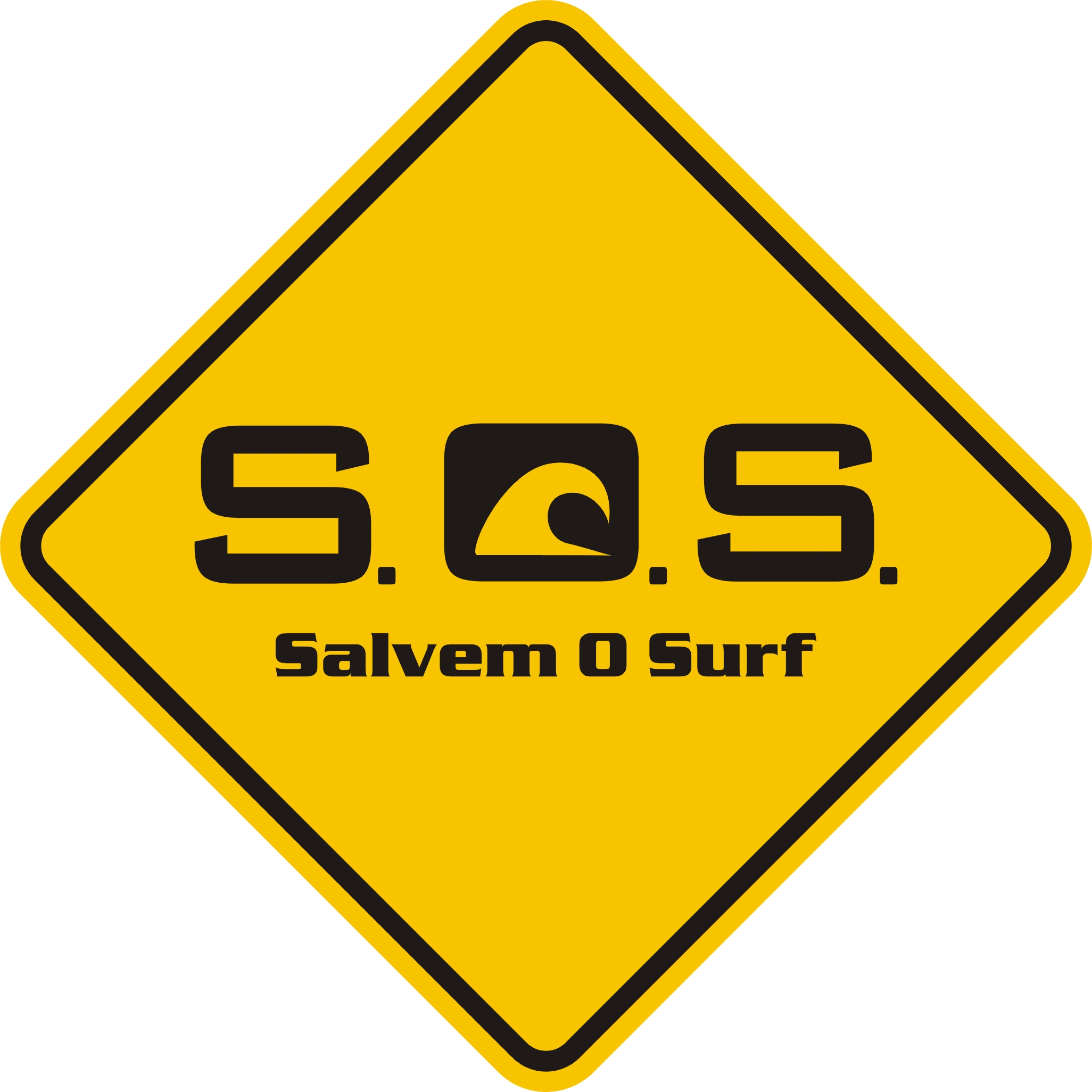
- Abbreviation: S.O.S.
- Formation: 2002
- Type: NGO
- Website: http://salvemosurf.org/sos/

S.O.S. Salvem O Surf (Save the Surf) is an environmental non-governmental organisation in Portugal, with a strong technical profile, that aims to solve problems and issues related with Surfing but also to develop the sport. It strives to solve problems constructively, guided by the need to raise awareness of the value of surf, and the will to create added value to all the involved parties.

S.O.S. Salvem O Surf as a spontaneous popular movement was born with SOS Santo Amaro at the end of 2002 with the objective to protect the wave of Santo Amaro de Oeiras, the only surfing alternative in the Lisbon region in days of strong stormy SW winds. The movement achieved an agreement with the Oeiras municipal council that allowed the preservation of 70% of the wave extension area.

== Guiding principles ==
S.O.S. Salvem O Surf's work is based on two sets of principles: the protection of surfing and its development.

=== Protection ===
1. Protecting and preserving beaches and waves for surfing.
2. Creating National and World Surfing Reserves.
3. Inclusion of surf in Environmental Impact Studies.
4. Environmental monitoring and care of water quality.
5. Correcting coastal work projects whenever there is a real threat to surfing.
6. Preservation of surfing in projects related with the energy of waves.
7. Safeguarding the public access to waves (preventing the privatisation of accesses and coast).

=== Development ===
1. Creation of artificial reefs that can be used for surfing.
2. Promotion and support of studies that sustainably promote the development of surfing.
3. Monitoring and characterisation of beaches and waves for surfing.
4. General social-economic studies aiming at better understanding the potential of surfing.
5. Saving lives of both surfers and swimmers, endangered by rip currents or coastal works.

== History ==
In the 2000 decade, partly boosted by the European Union Structural Funds and Cohesion Funds, the number of coastal engineering works increased dramatically in the Portuguese coast, to develop harbours or to protect the coast. However, in general, the Environmental Impact Accessment of these coastal constructions ignored to study the respective impacts on surfing. S.O.S. started as a civic and informal surfer movement in 2002/2003 to preserve beaches and waves for surfing from these coastal works who ignored surfing. In 2008/2009, S.O.S. turned legal, as a non-profit surfer's Association in order to improve the protecting and developing of surfing. S.O.S. is further being upgraded to an Environmental Non-Governmental Organization, since the surf and beach damaging coastal works continue being constructed. S. O. S. has been organizing campaigns to protect the coast since 2002.

=== 2002 ===
Santo Amaro S.O.S. came to life from a group of surfers to defend the only wave near Lisbon that works with SW storms and, for the first time in Portugal, technical reasoning was used to convince the Harbour of Lisbon and the local municipality of Oeiras that the peer would damage the wave and would not have the desired protective effect. These entities have changed the project and build a peer with only half of the length preserving 70% of the wave extension.

=== 2003 ===
Carcavelos – in February, S.O.S. campaigned to converge more than 5.000 surfers to this beach break to ask the municipality of Cascais not to build groins to contain the sands (again, technical proof was given that this was not an efficient solution). With a 100% success, the wave was fully preserved. Moreover, S.O.S. was awarded a medal by the Municipality for its actions in “protection of nature and the environment”.

=== 2003 and 2006 ===
Costa da Caparica – in June 2003, local surf clubs have asked S.O.S. to help them making a case for the beach sand nourishment to protect the coast line. Despite giving technical evidence the Municipality has not heard the surfers and in 2006 the dunes were damaged by storms and high tides, leading to an expensive and urgent beach nourishment and sea wall increase. Costa da Caparica Erosion continues in Costa da Caparica and S.O.S. considers that the present groin and sea wall defence of is not sustainable.

=== 2003 and 2008 ===
Jardim do Mar- S.O.S. supported technically in 2003 the civic movement for the preservation of Jardim do Mar, led by the environmental associations Save the Waves Coalition, Quercus and Cosmo. S.O.S. and has been repeatedly advocating the construction of Multi-purpose Reefs, however composed of rock since rock is the local natural substrate, to recover the damaged waves of Jardim do Mar, Lugar de Baixo and Ponta Delgada in the island of Madeira. However the Regional Government of Madeira has not yet chosen to recover the damaged waves.

=== 2006 ===
S.Pedro do Estoril – As a result of the preserving of Carcavelos Beach, the Cascais Municipality has requested a study for an artificial reef to improve surf conditions in S.Pedro do Estoril. The members of the Technical team of SOS also motivated some of the best Science and Engineering Institutions of Portugal, Instituto Superior Técnico, School of Sciences of University of Lisbon and Laboratório Nacional de Engenharia Civil, to join the Cascais Municipality in the artificial surfing reef study.

=== 2008 ===
Carcavelos – In July 2008, together with the event organizer Ceativa, S.O.S. created a Giant Logo, composed by surfers, their surfboards and bodyboards, with giant human capital letters SOS. The logo included 96 surfers and bodyboarders. In 2009 the Giant Logo was repeated at Carcavelos and at Figueira da Foz. The S.O.S. Giant Logo is a remarkable symbol of S. O. S. with a large symbolic impact in the media and in the public.

=== 2009 ===
Cabedelo, Figueira da Foz – S.O.S. was called to give technical support to a locals surfer movement that wanted to impede the extension of a peer north of the Mondego River threatening this world class wave. S.O.S. has also given support to create a massive Giant Logo, composed of 200 surfers, in the water.

== Casualties ==
In addition, S.O.S. members have been, or are still, involved in many other threatened waves, with mixed results:

- Rabo de Peixe, Azores: Disappeared
- Kirra, Sines: Disappeared
- Cabedelo, Porto: Disappeared
- São Torpes, Sines: Endangered
- Santa Catarina, Azores: Endangered
- Caxias, Oeiras/Lisbon: Endangered

== Lost waves ==
Portugal loses, on average, one world quality wave per year.

SURF SPOT	REGION	MAIN QUALITIES	CONSTRUCTION TYPE	YEAR	SOS TEAM	PROJECTED LOSS	FINAL LOSS
Pico de Rabo de Peixe	Azores	Big and long	Fishing harbour jetty	2000	4	100%	100%
Lugar de Baixo right	Madeira	Tubular and long	Sea wall for marina	2001	2	100%	40%
Kirra right	Alentejo	Tubular and long	Commercial harbour jetty	2002	1	100%	100%
Santo Amaro de Oeiras	Lisbon	Tubular and long	Jetty for beach nourishment	2003	20	50%	30%
Points of Costa de Caparica	Lisbon	Multiple beach breaks	Beach nourishment	2004	6	20%	10%
Jardim do Mar right	Madeira	Big and long	Sea wall for coastal protection	2005	2	50%	50%
Points of Carcavelos	Lisbon	Beach break tubular	Groins for beach nourishment	2005	30	30%	0%
Ponta Delgada left	Madeira	Big and long	Swimming pool with jetty	2005	2	100%	100%
Cabedelo of Douro left	Porto	Tubular	Jetty for coastal protection	2006	1	100%	100%
Cabedelo of Figueira da Foz left	Center	Big and long	Commercial harbour jetty	2009	12	50%	50%
Pico de Santa Catarina	Azores	Tubular	Commercial harbour jetty	2010	2	100%	-%
S. Torpes	Alentejo	Beach break	Commercial harbour jetty	2011	4	50%	-%
Rabo de Peixe left	Azores	Long	Fishing harbour jetty	2010	4	100%	-%
