= Nélson Moutinho =

Portuguese footballer

Personal information
- Full name: José Nélson de Almeida Moutinho
- Date of birth: 6 June 1959 (age 67)
- Place of birth: Oeiras, Portugal
- Position: Forward

Youth career
- 1972–1977: Benfica

Senior career*
Years	Team	Apps	(Gls)
1977–1979	Portimonense	60	(18)
1979–1980	Beira-Mar	28	(5)
1980–1981	União Leiria	12	(2)
1981–1982	Barreirense	30	(18)
1982–1983	Benfica Castelo Branco	29	(19)
1983–1986	Olhanense	80	(33)
1986–1989	Barreirense	98	(37)
1989–1991	Olhanense	70	(11)
1991–1992	Silves	17	(4)
Total		424	(147)

International career
1976	Portugal U16	3	(0)
1976–1977	Portugal U18	12	(4)
1978	Portugal U21	1	(0)
- * Club domestic league appearances and goals

José Nélson de Almeida Moutinho (born 6 June 1959) is a Portuguese former footballer who played as a forward.

== Club career ==
Born in Oeiras, Lisbon District, Moutinho amassed Primeira Liga totals of 54 matches and 12 goals over two seasons, representing in the competition Portimonense S.C. and S.C. Beira-Mar and being relegated with the former club in 1978 and the latter in 1980. The vast majority of his remaining career—15 years in total—was spent in the second division.

== Personal life ==
Moutinho's son, João, is also a footballer. A midfielder, he previously represented Sporting CP, FC Porto and AS Monaco FC. He currently represents S.C. Braga in addition to serving as a longtime Portugal international.
