= Soccer Invest Fund =

Soccer Invest Fund was a Portuguese association football private investment fund, the second Portuguese football fund after Benfica Stars Fund relaunched the industry. It was managed by MNF Gestão de Activos - S.G.F.I.M., S.A. (literally MNF Asset Management). It was reported that João Frederico Lino de Castro, ex-member of Sporting CP Board of the General Assembly, was one of the administrators of the fund, which himself a non-executive administrator of MNF Capital.

The fund started operation in May 2011; at first 14,500 units of the shares were issued to investor and the startup capital of the fund was €1,450,000. The fund was planned to issue 100,000 units and scheduled to end the subscription period on 13 January 2013 (two years after obtaining the permit). It was liquidated in 2016.

The fund made its first transaction in July, acquired João Moutinho's 37.5% rights, Ukra and André Castro 15% rights for about €4.8 million, but in late July (announced on 3 August) Moutinho's 22.5% rights were sold back to Porto for €4 million; the fund also adjusted the fair value of its 15% rights of Moutinho to €2.66 million (4 million divided by 22.5% times 15%) and combined with the asset value of the two Porto youngster, made the fund net asset increased to €3,662,533.25 at the end of July (from €1,439,498.31 in June and that month issued unit had €1,450,000 nominal value).

In August, the fund issued more units to 15,700, and also acquired 25% rights of Jorge Fucile form other investor and 11% of Juan Manuel Iturbe from Porto, which Porto's share on Iturbe was dropped from 60% in May 2011 to 49%. In September the units increased to 21,200. In December, the fund acquired Djalma and sold 20% of Fucile.

MNF Gestão de Activos director António Aranha declared that the fund would buy players from Portugal and the rest of the world and was not dedicated to one club.

== Investments ==
Date	Players	Nationality	Percentage	Price	Acquire from	Departed date	Departed team	Departed price (adj.)
ca. July 2011	João Moutinho	Portugal	22.5%	€2,516,250	"Mamers BV"	3 August 2011	(Portugal) Porto	€4M
ca. July 2011	João Moutinho	Portugal	15%	€1,677,500	"Mamers BV"	30 January 2013	(Portugal) Porto	€3.3M
ca. July 2011	Ukra	Portugal	15%	€300,000	Porto	ca. July 2012		ca. €203,750
ca. July 2011	André Castro	Portugal	15%	€300,000	Porto	ca. June 2012		ca. €203,750
ca. August 2011	Jorge Fucile	Uruguay	20%	€440,000	?	ca. December 2011	(Portugal) Porto	€1M
ca. August 2011	Jorge Fucile	Uruguay	5%	€110,000	?	2014		
ca. August 2011	Juan Iturbe	Argentina	11%	€1,062,500	Porto	2014		
ca. June 2012	Juan Iturbe	Argentina	4%	€1,062,500		2014		
ca. December 2011	Djalma	Angola	25%	€500,000	Porto	2015		
ca. July 2012	Eduardo Silva		10%	€101,875		2014		
ca. July 2012	Mikel Agu	Nigeria	10%	€101,875		2015		
Total				€7,070,000				
