= Oeiras e São Julião da Barra =

Coordinates: 38°41′50″N 9°18′30″W

Palace of the Marquis of Pombal.

Oeiras e São Julião da Barra (Portuguese pronunciation: [ɔˈɐjɾɐz i sɐ̃w ʒuliˈɐ̃w dɐ ˈβaʁɐ]) was a former civil parish in the municipality of Oeiras, Portugal. In 2013, the parish merged into the new parish Oeiras e São Julião da Barra, Paço de Arcos e Caxias. In 1835, the foundations of the new administrative system were laid, and appropriate legislation was passed for the creation of Parish Councils, the forerunners of Parish Councils. The parish of São Julião da Barra was strictly limited to the old fortification, which gave it a purely military character. The decree of November 6, 1836 states that the parish of São Julião da Barra had only 24 dwellings and was separated from the parish of Oeiras, which at that time had 850 dwellings. Then, in 1900, the Cardinal Patriarch decided to annex the parish of São Julião da Barra to the parish of Nossa Senhora da Purificação de Oeiras. The latter split in 1926 with the creation of the parish of Paço de Arcos, consolidating the parish of Oeiras and São Julião da Barra.
