= Oeiras, Portugal =

Oeiras
- Municipality
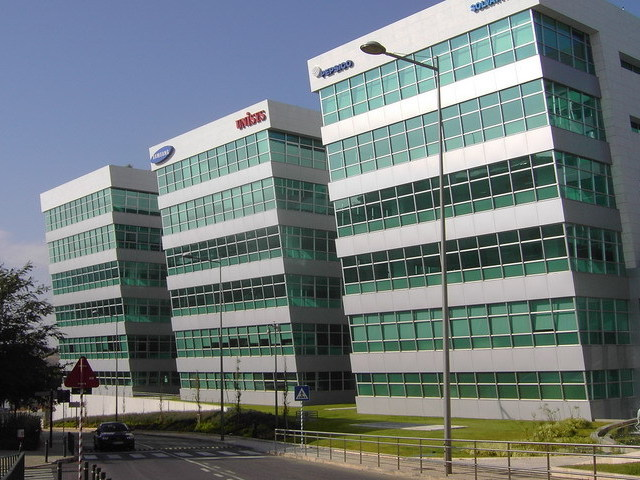
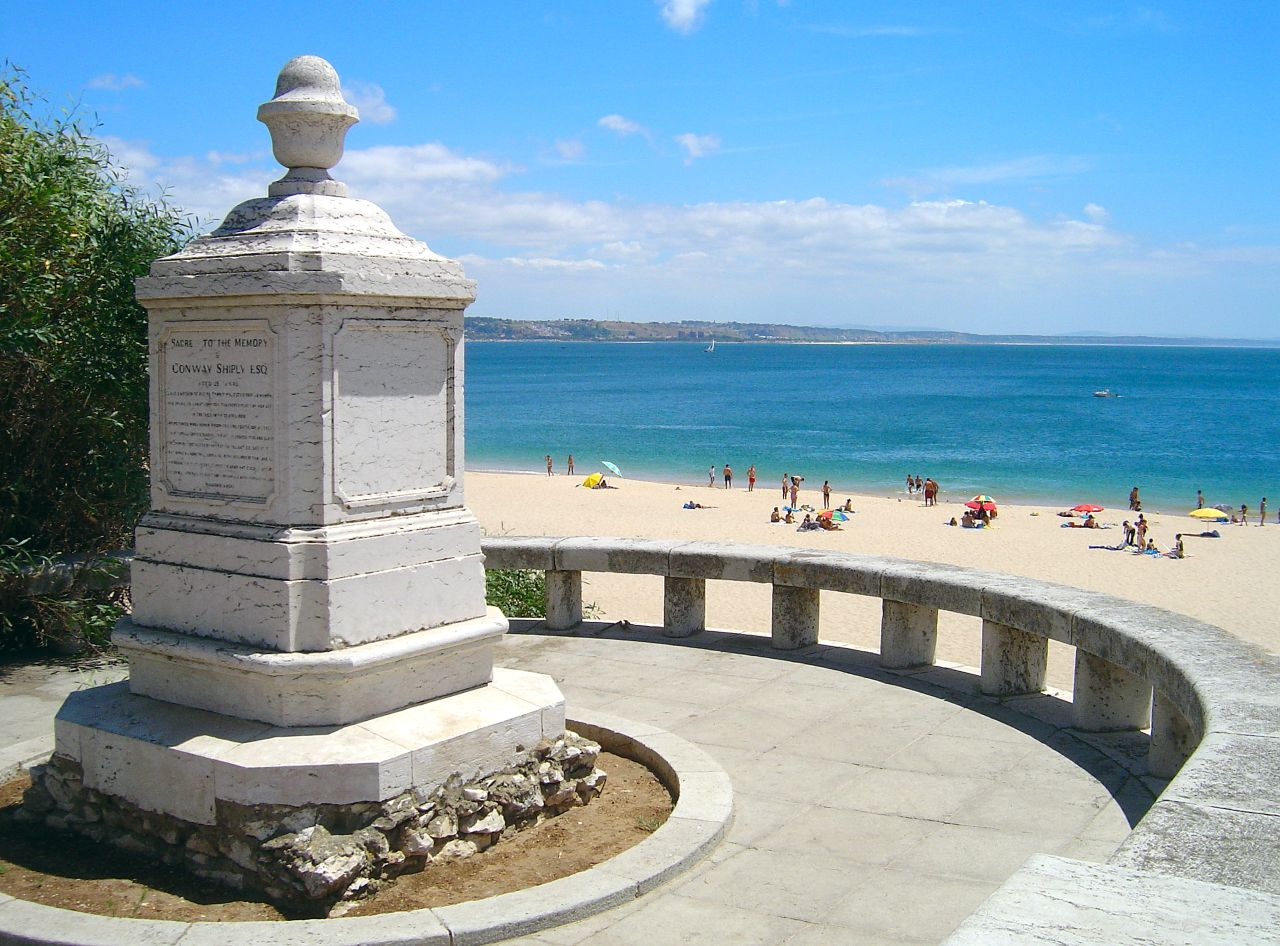
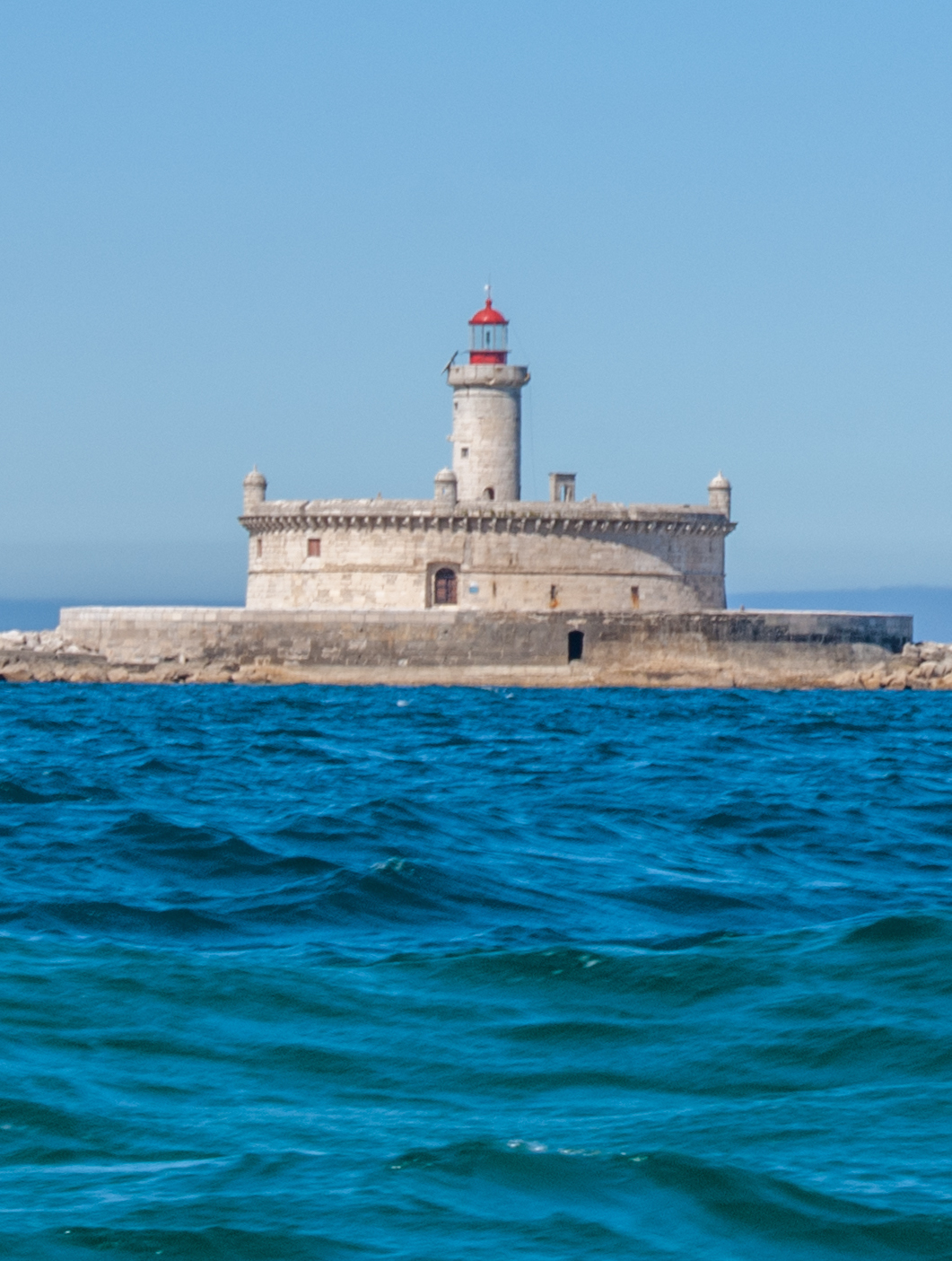
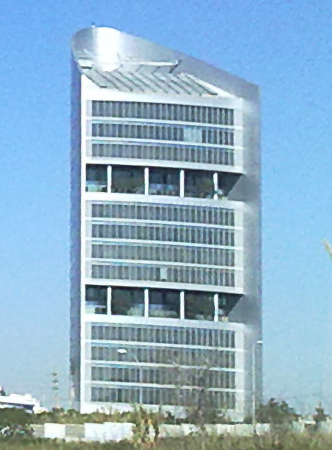
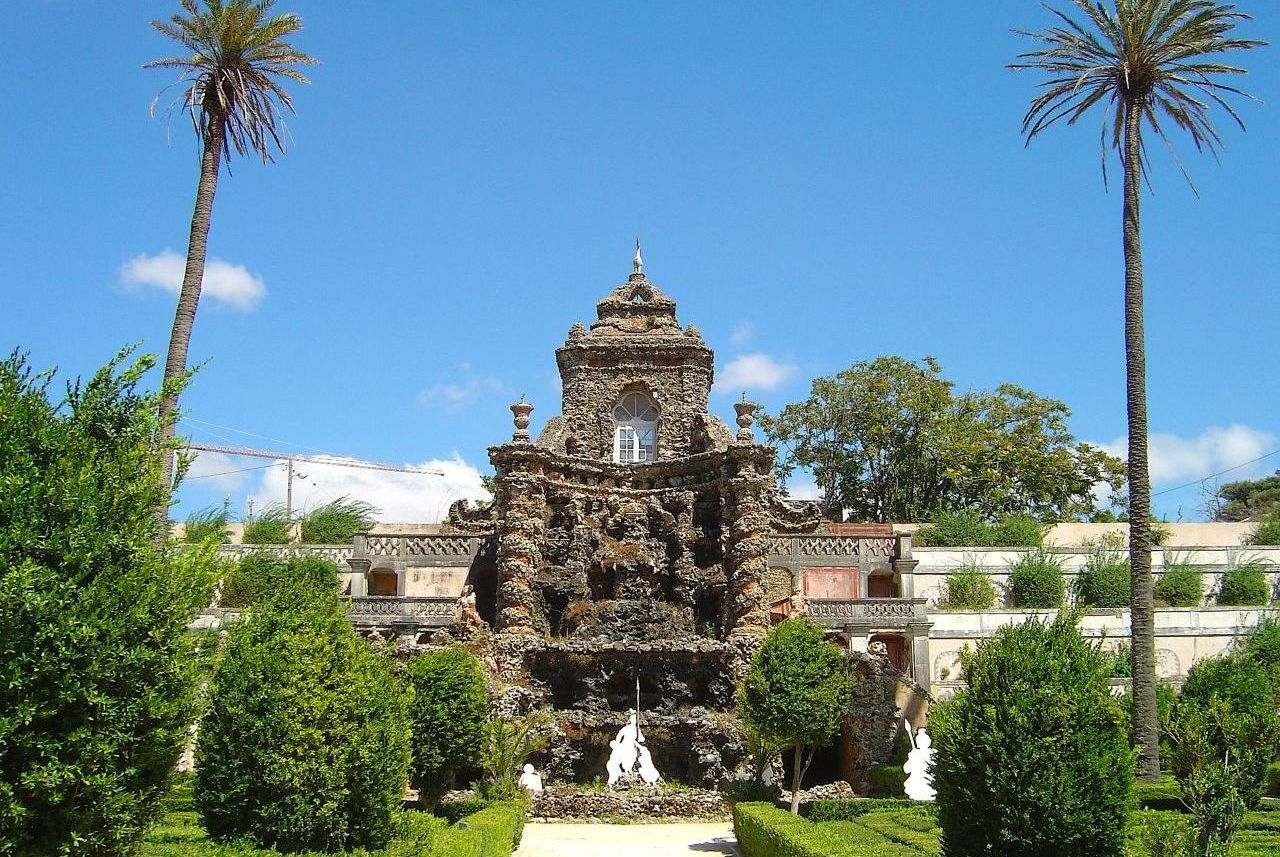
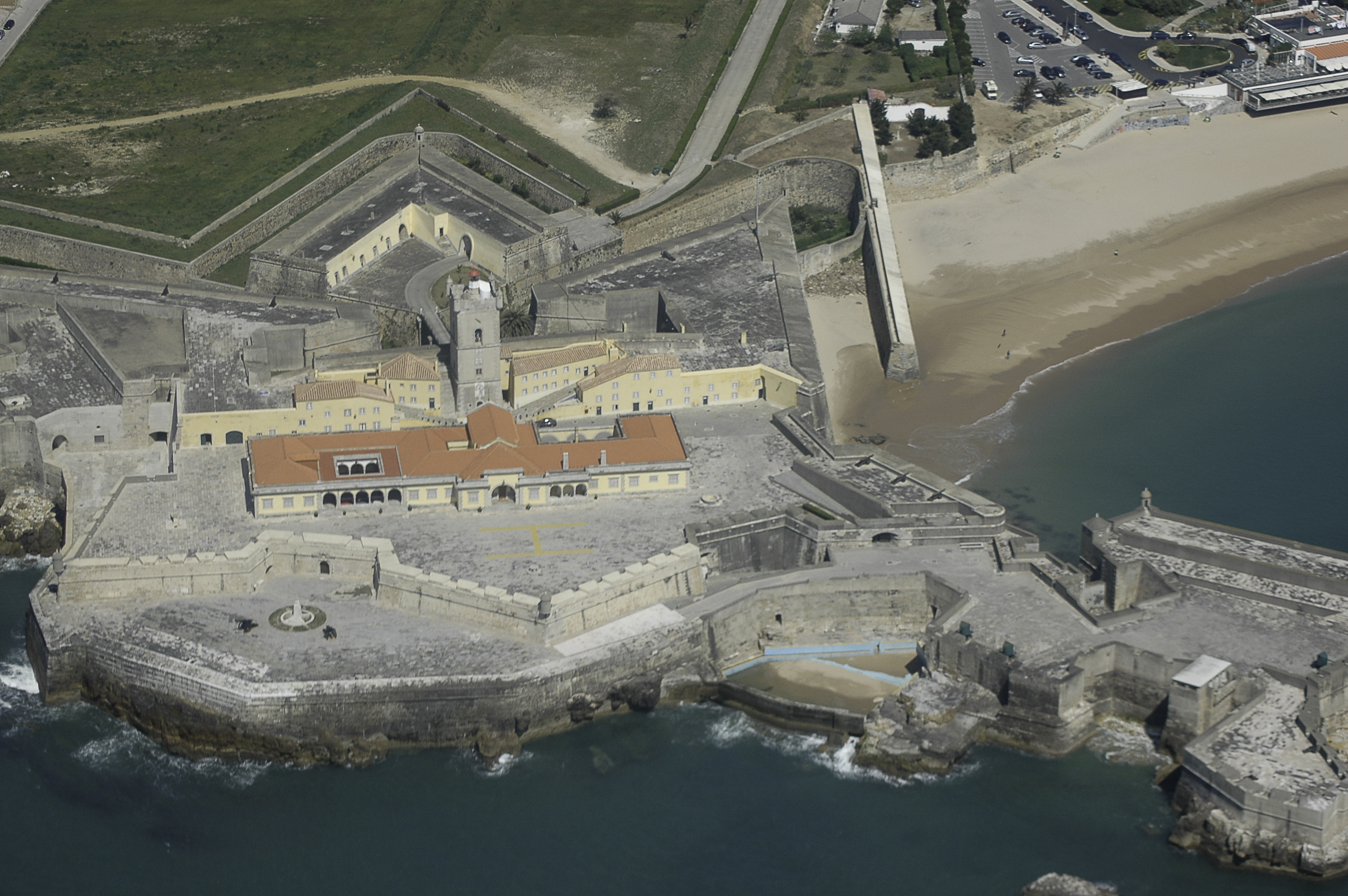
- Top: Porto Salvo; Paço de Arcos Beach; middle: Palace of the Marquis of Pombal; Fort of São Lourenço do Bugio; Monsanto Tower; bottom: Royal Gardens of Caxias; São Julião da Barra Fortress

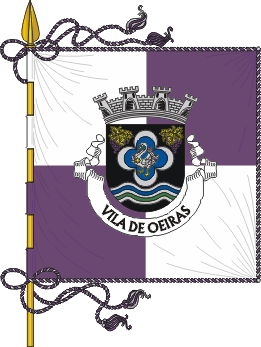
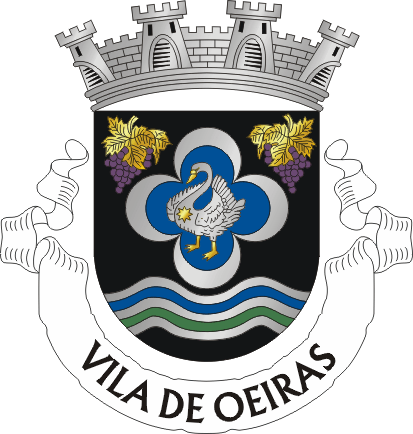
- Flag Coat of arms
- Interactive map of Oeiras
- Coordinates: 38°41′N 9°19′W
- Country: Portugal
- Region: Lisbon
- Metropolitan area: Lisbon
- District: Lisbon
- Parishes: 5

Government
  - President: Isaltino Morais (Ind.)

Area
  - Total: 45.88 km^{2} (17.71 sq mi)
- Lowest elevation: 0 m (0 ft)

Population (2011)
  - Total: 172,120
  - Density: 3,752/km^{2} (9,716/sq mi)
- Time zone: UTC+00:00 (WET)
  - Summer (DST): UTC+01:00 (WEST)
- Postal code: 2784
- Area code: 214
- Patron: Nossa Senhora da Purificação
- Website: www.cm-oeiras.pt

Oeiras (locally [ɔˈɐjɾɐʃ]) is a town and municipality in the western part of Lisbon metropolitan area, located within the Portuguese Riviera, in continental Portugal. The municipality is part of the urban agglomeration of Lisbon and the town of Oeiras is about 16 km from Lisbon downtown. The population in 2011 was 172,120 living in an area of 45.88 km^{2}, making the municipality the fifth-most densely populated in Portugal.

Oeiras is an important economic hub, being one of the most highly developed municipalities of Portugal and Europe. It has the highest GDP per capita in the country, being also the second highest-ranking municipality (immediately after Lisbon) in terms of purchasing power as well as the second highest-ranking in the country as far as tax collection is concerned. These economic indicators also reflect the education level of its inhabitants, as Oeiras is the municipality with the highest concentration of population by tertiary education attainment in the country, their entrepreneurial prowess and the economically liberal mindset of Oeiras' society in general. It also has the lowest unemployment rate in the Lisbon area.

== History ==
The mild climate, access to water, quality of its soils and geographically advantageous location at the mouth of the Tagus River attracted early settlement to this region. The rugged hilltops of the interior conditioned cultivation and allowed the settlement of several small agricultural castros within the region's limits, such as Castro of Leceia (which was classified in 1963 as a property of public interest). This archaeological site is a witness to the early settlements and defensive structures that developed during the Chalcolithic period, although Paleolithic camps such as Gruta da Ponte da Laje are indicative of earlier settlements.

Remnants of the Roman occupation of the Iberian peninsula are evident in many places throughout the municipality, including mosaics, specifically along the Rua das Alcássimas, and a Roman bridge. The later Arab conquest left behind several toponymic markers, including Arab/Moorish place names such as Alcássimas, Algés, Alpendroado and Quinta da Moura.

=== Kingdom era ===
The settlement of Oeiras dates back to 1208, when the area was colonized by Christians arrived from northern lands of the Kingdom of Portugal who were moving south into warmer agricultural lands during the process of Reconquista (reconquest of ancient Visigothic Kingdom’s territory occupied by Muslim invaders since the 8th century).

At the beginning of the Age of Discoveries, Oeiras became the industrial and commercial warehouse of Lisbon. The development of the Gunpowder Factory (Portuguese: Fábrica da Pólvora) in Barcarena was therefore important in the expansion of the Portuguese dominions of the Orient, in addition to the aggregate extraction and calcium oxide furnaces in Paço de Arcos. These industries were supported and guarded by the construction of several fortifications along a maritime defensive line that ringed the southern coast to Lisbon and that controlled navigation in the Tagus estuary from the 16th to 18th centuries. This perimeter included the Fort of São Lourenço da Cabeça Seca (also known as the Lighthouse or Tower of Bugio), rising from a tiny islet in the middle of the Tagus River, as well as the Fort of São Julião da Barra, both examples of Renaissance military architecture.

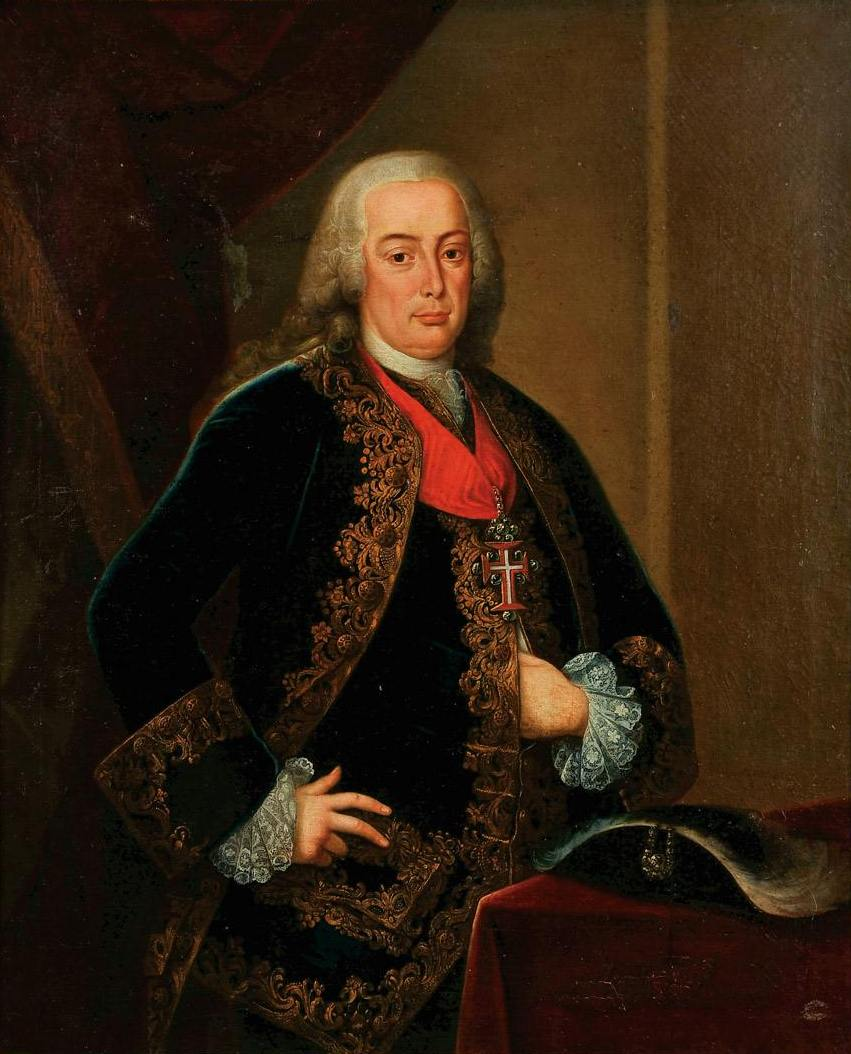
The first Marquis of Pombal, formerly known as the Count of Oeiras, Sebastião José de Carvalho e Melo.

The municipality was founded in 1759 by the Marquis of Pombal on an area granted as a reward by King Joseph I to his minister for his efforts in rebuilding Lisbon's historical downtown (Portuguese: Baixa) after the 1755 Lisbon earthquake. A royal charter, dated 7 June 1759, gave jurisdiction over the lands within Oeiras to the King's loyal minister, who became the first Count of Oeiras. A month later, the small village was elevated to the status of town, and then gained municipal status on 13 June 1759. Although Oeiras had a history of earlier settlement, it was during the reign of Joseph I that economic and social development, conditioned by the influence of the King's Minister, who promoted innovation and supported local economic activities, began to flourish.

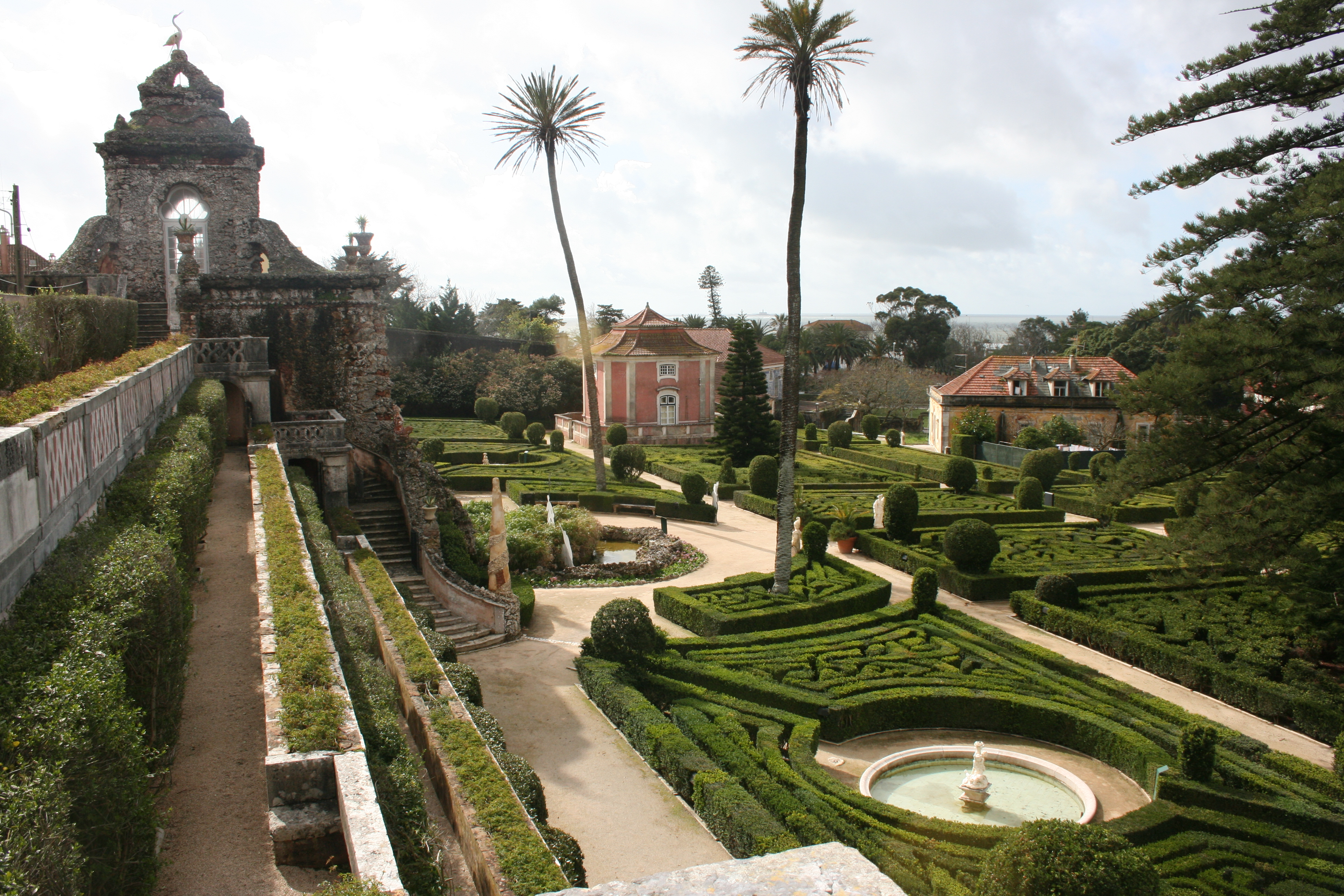
The gardens of the Royal Palace of Caxias, used by the Portuguese royal family.

In 1770, the first agricultural and industrial fair was established in Oeiras, representing a unique national event that also contributed to the creation of fishing shelters and a new customs house and factory, among other projects. One of the principal developments was the construction of the estate of the Marquess of Pombal, which today exists in its original form, with garden, palace and agricultural dependencies, such as the wine cellar, barn and other buildings, today housing the national institutions responsible for bio-science.

In 1894, the municipality was abolished, but it was reestablished four years later on 13 January 1898. It was reconstituted without Carcavelos, which was annexed to Cascais, while gaining the civil parish of Benfica. In the late 17th and early 18th centuries, several estates and palaces began to be constructed in order to explore agricultural production, principally cereals and vineyards, which supported the growing markets of Lisbon. However, this activity began to decline by the 19th century and was replaced by new industry, supported by the Lisbon-Cascais railway link, first inaugurated in 1889. Large factories began to locate in the municipality, among them the Fábrica do Papel, the Fundição de Oeiras, a Lusalite and Fermentos Holandeses.

=== 20th century ===
In the late 19th and early 20th centuries, the growth of leisure activities along the coast transformed Oeiras, which became a privileged location for the Portuguese elite.

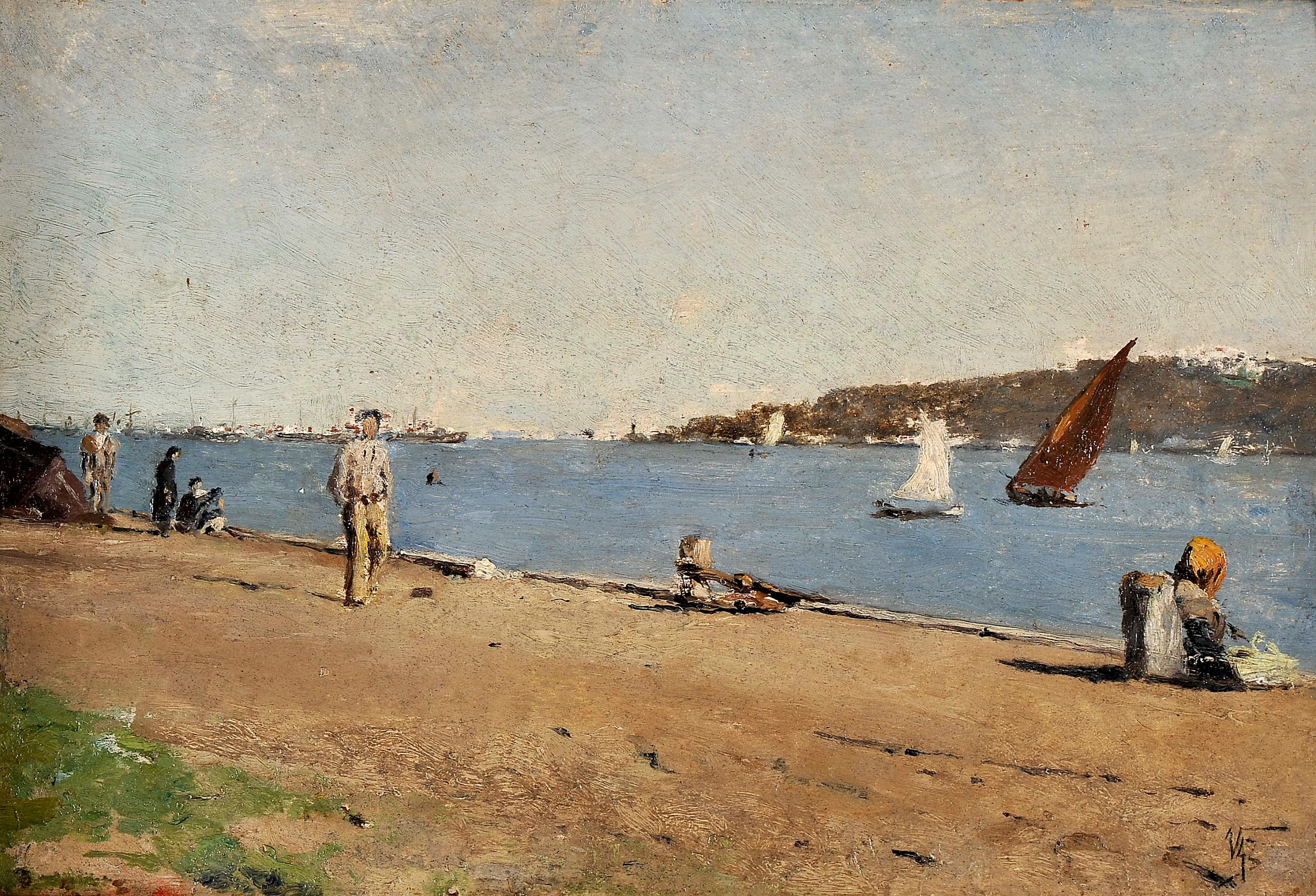
Algés Beach, Oeiras, oil on wood, by João Vaz. Private collection. (c. 1900)

By the beginning of the 20th century, many of the beaches in Oeiras were already occupied by the higher social classes, who travelled to the municipality for medical reasons (believing the air and beach-waters were therapeutic). The construction of National Roadway 6 (EN6) would later link Lisboa to Cascais, permitting new travellers to experience the area, resulting in an influx of new residents that expanded the urban centres, giving rise to beach "chalets" and summer cottages. Simultaneously, the concentration of economic activities in Lisbon and surrounding urban municipalities meant that Oeiras had direct access to the capital.

After 1940–50, the municipality began to function as a suburb and bedroom community, attracting more residential growth along the coast. This culminated in the 1970s with the appearance of illegal urban settlements, squatters and barrios. Until the 1980s, the municipality was dependent on the much larger urban centre for development.

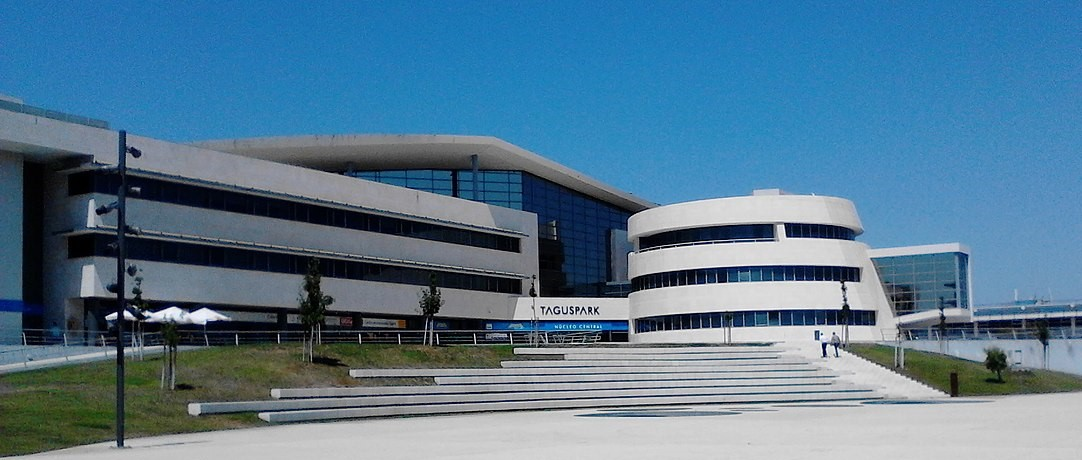
Taguspark, congress center.

By the end of the 1980s, however, Oeiras began to constitute its own economic pole in the Lisbon metropolitan area, concentrating its development on tertiary activities linked to science, investigation, information technology and communications. At the end of the 20th century, the municipality became known for its high standard of living, leaving behind its image as a suburb of Lisbon and assuming an important position as a centre associated with new technologies (with the establishment of various technology parks, such as Taguspark and LagoasPark) and service industries. The elevated standard of living and work allowed the region to obtain several awards, including the Melhor Concelho para Trabalhar ('Best Municipality to Work'), Município de excelência ('Municipal Excellence' Award), European Enterprise Award and the ECOXXI Award.

== Geography ==
Oeiras' civil parishes after the 2013 territorial reorganization

The municipality is located along the northern margin and mouth of the Tagus River, across from the municipality of Almada, surrounded by the municipalities of Lisbon (east), Sintra (north), Amadora (northeast) and Cascais (west).

Administratively, the municipality is divided into five civil parishes (freguesias):

- Algés, Linda-a-Velha e Cruz Quebrada-Dafundo
- Barcarena
- Carnaxide e Queijas
- Oeiras e São Julião da Barra, Paço de Arcos e Caxias
- Porto Salvo

Along the 10 km coastline, where the Tagus River meets the ocean, several natural coves were at the origin of its beaches:

- Praia da Torre
- Praia de Santo Amaro de Oeiras
- Praia de Paço de Arcos
- Praia de Caxias

Two major green areas spread over Oeiras municipality: the Estação Agronómica Nacional and the Jamor sports complex.

=== Climate ===
Oeiras has a warm-summer Mediterranean climate (Köppen: Csb, Trewartha: Csbl), with warm, dry summers and mild, wet winters with less precipitation and slightly smoother variations in temperature than the nearby city of Lisbon.

Climate data for Sassoeiros, 1 km (0.62 mi) northwest of Oeiras, 1961-1990 normals and extremes, altitude: 50 m (160 ft)
Month	Jan	Feb	Mar	Apr	May	Jun	Jul	Aug	Sep	Oct	Nov	Dec	Year
Record high °C (°F)	20.5 (68.9)	22.7 (72.9)	25.6 (78.1)	27.3 (81.1)	35.0 (95.0)	42.3 (108.1)	39.5 (103.1)	38.5 (101.3)	38.6 (101.5)	33.5 (92.3)	27.0 (80.6)	21.5 (70.7)	42.3 (108.1)
Mean daily maximum °C (°F)	14.6 (58.3)	15.1 (59.2)	16.7 (62.1)	18.1 (64.6)	20.9 (69.6)	24.0 (75.2)	26.4 (79.5)	27.0 (80.6)	25.8 (78.4)	22.0 (71.6)	17.9 (64.2)	15.1 (59.2)	20.3 (68.5)
Daily mean °C (°F)	11.1 (52.0)	11.8 (53.2)	12.8 (55.0)	14.0 (57.2)	16.3 (61.3)	19.2 (66.6)	21.3 (70.3)	21.8 (71.2)	20.8 (69.4)	17.8 (64.0)	14.2 (57.6)	11.8 (53.2)	16.1 (60.9)
Mean daily minimum °C (°F)	7.6 (45.7)	8.4 (47.1)	9.0 (48.2)	10.0 (50.0)	11.7 (53.1)	14.4 (57.9)	16.2 (61.2)	16.6 (61.9)	15.8 (60.4)	13.5 (56.3)	10.4 (50.7)	8.4 (47.1)	11.8 (53.3)
Record low °C (°F)	−1.0 (30.2)	0.5 (32.9)	1.5 (34.7)	2.0 (35.6)	4.4 (39.9)	8.0 (46.4)	8.0 (46.4)	9.0 (48.2)	6.5 (43.7)	5.0 (41.0)	1.2 (34.2)	−1.0 (30.2)	−1.0 (30.2)
Average precipitation mm (inches)	94.6 (3.72)	92.9 (3.66)	59.9 (2.36)	58.8 (2.31)	38.5 (1.52)	16.7 (0.66)	3.8 (0.15)	5.6 (0.22)	18.1 (0.71)	70.4 (2.77)	109.5 (4.31)	96.0 (3.78)	664.8 (26.17)
Average relative humidity (%)	79	77	72	74	71	68	63	63	66	70	75	73	71
Source: IPMA

== Demographics ==
Population of the municipality of Oeiras (1849 - 2011)
Year	Pop.	±%
1801	6,069	—
1849	5,072	−16.4%
1900	10,447	+106.0%
1930	29,440	+181.8%
1960	94,255	+220.2%
1981	149,328	+58.4%
1991	151,342	+1.3%
2001	162,128	+7.1%
2011	172,120	+6.2%

Oeiras municipality had a population of 172,120 at the 2011 census, remaining the nation's 11th most populous municipality and the 5th greatest in terms of population density.

The major expansion in the municipality's demographics, like those of the other municipalities that circle Lisbon, occurred in the second half of the 20th century. Realizing this growth, and understanding that there was a need to control urban sprawl, in 1948 the Plano de Urbanização da Costa do Sol ('Sun Coast Urbanization Plan') was adopted to manage this activities in the northern margin of the Tagus. This remained active until 1994, when the first Plano Director Municipal ('Municipal Plan') was adopted.

Demographically, the population is divided into 52.6% women to 47.4% men, with the majority of its resident population in the cohort between 25 and 64 years of age (approximately 92,978 inhabitants). Rounding out these numbers, there are 24,153 seniors over the age of 65 and 22,685 residents less than 14 years of age. Oeiras has the highest concentration of bachelor's and PhD degrees in the country, as well as the highest percentage of graduates in the country: 26%.

Number of Inhabitants by age group
	1900	1911	1920	1930	1940	1950	1960	1970	1981	1991	2001	2011
0–14 years	3,170	5,373	5,352	7,870	9,096	11,404	22,855	46,865	38,784	27,728	22,685	26,559
15–24 years	2,082	3,473	4,123	6,405	7,313	10,206	14,679	26,285	20,635	24,932	22,312	16,533
25–64 years	4,936	7,625	8,335	13,748	19,744	28,262	51,388	96,155	79,278	82,855	92,978	96,059
≤ 65 years	559	805	847	1,340	2,118	3,129	5,333	10,910	10,631	15,827	24,153	32,969
Unknown age	21	91	265	31	111							

== Economy ==
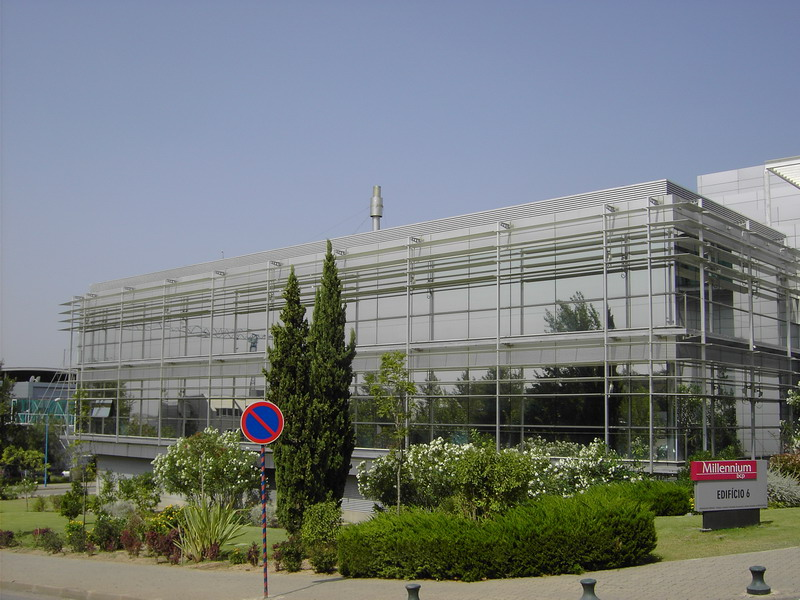
The operational headquarters of Banco Comercial Português banking corporation

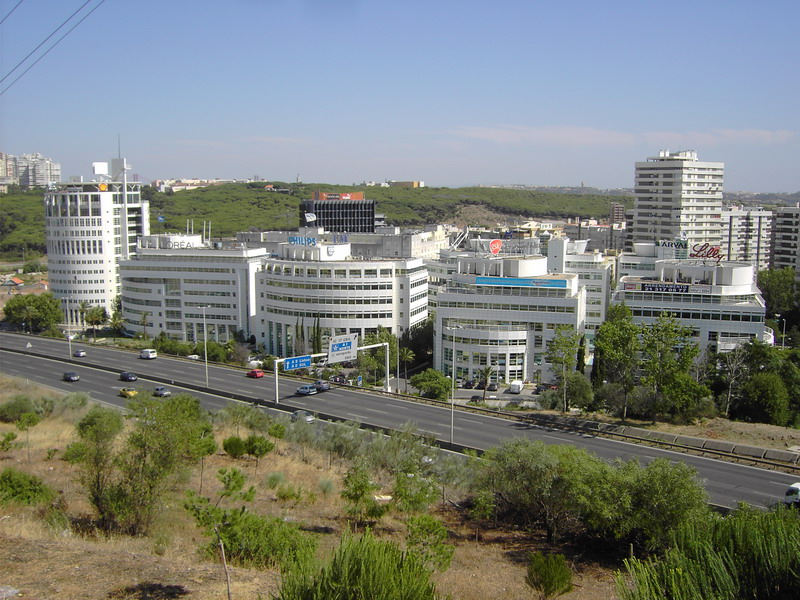
The Arquiparque, one of the several business parks located in Oeiras

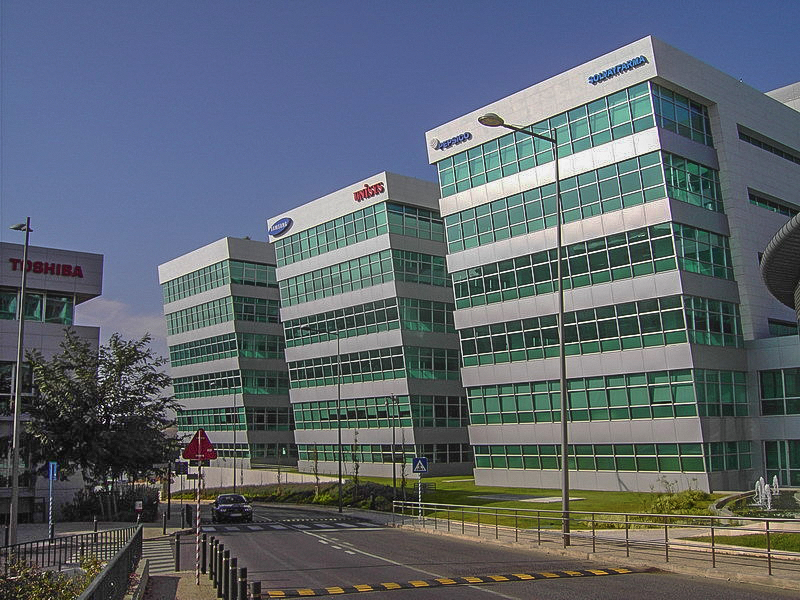
The office block within the LagoasPark complex in the civil parish of Porto Salvo

The industrialized and heavily commercial municipality is occupied by several facilities, which include the headquarters of SIC and TVI (two major Portuguese television networks), as well as main operational offices, research units, subsidiaries and branches of many large multinational companies, including Google, Nestlé, McDonald's, BP, General Electric, Cisco, Synopsys, P&G, Hewlett-Packard, Dell, Epson, Samsung, LG, Unit4, Philips, Intel, Colgate-Palmolive, Johnson & Johnson, L'Oréal, Oracle, Atlas Copco, ABB, Daikin, Nike, Nissan, PepsiCo, Pfizer, Grundfos, Merck & Co, NetJets Europe, Synopsys, Miele, Unisys, BMW, Toshiba, Canon, GSK, Volvo Cars, and Stellantis. The headquarters of Omni Aviation and its Portuguese subsidiary airline White Airways are also located in the area.

The municipality is also a business incubator due to the purposeful creation of many science, technology, research and business parks and centers, including:

- Arquiparque
- Lagoas Park
- Miraflores Premium
- Neo Park
- Parque Holanda
- Parque Suécia
- Quinta da Fonte
- Taguspark - Science and Technology Park
- Tagus Space

Several not-for-profit private and governmental institutions are also headquartered within the vicinity of Oeiras town. These include the principal naval service command of the North Atlantic Treaty Organization's (NATO) Allied Command Operations (ACO); IGC - Instituto Gulbenkian de Ciência, and a branch of the Instituto Nacional dos Recursos Biológicos, responsible for agrarian research, the Estação Agronómica Nacional (National Agronomy Station), which are all located within the municipality of Oeiras.

The first Portuguese semiconductor company, Chipidea, founded in 1997, was established in Oeiras until being acquired by MIPS Technologies for $147 million in 2007. On May 8, 2009, Synopsys acquired it as the Analog Business Group from MIPS Technologies for $22 million in cash.

== Main sights ==
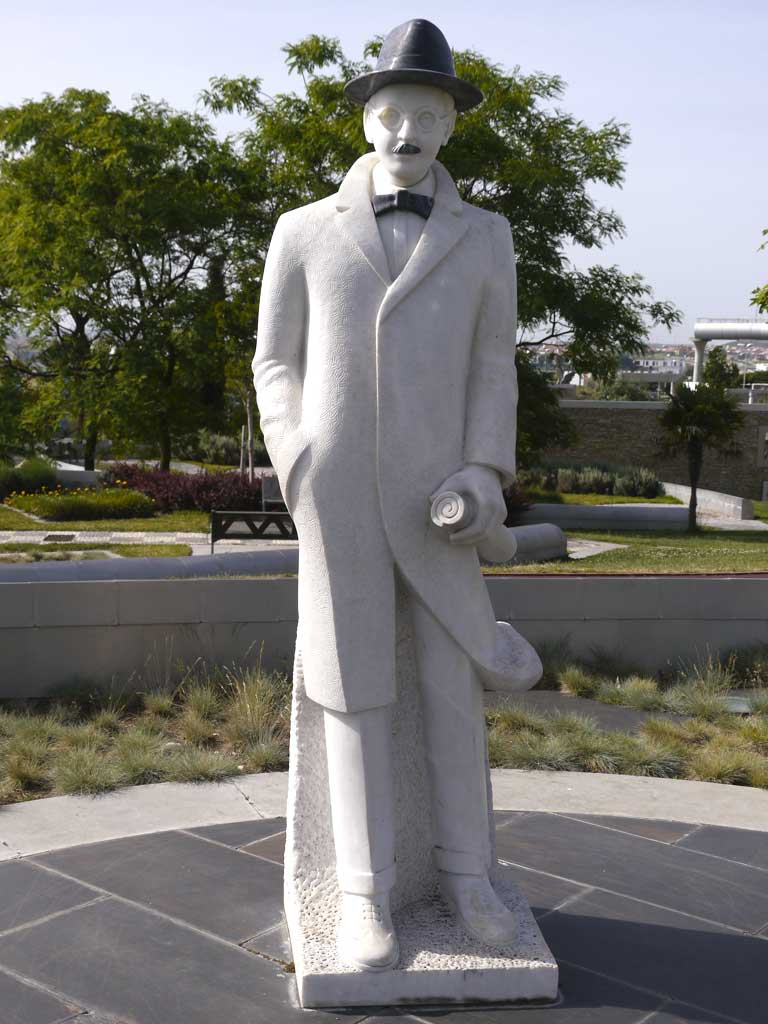
Statue of Fernando Pessoa in the Poet's park, Oeiras

Oeiras offers a range of points of interest, ranging from monuments of unique and historical value, such as the Palace of Marquês de Pombal and Palace of the Royal Estate in Caxias (that dates from the 18th century and surrounded by luxurious gardens) to sites with industrial history, like the Fábrica da Pólvora de Barcarena ('Barcarena Gunpowder Factory'), a reclaimed arms factory used for leisure and cultural purposes.

Leisure facilities include the sports complex of Jamor, Oeiras' promenade (linking Algés and Oeiras e São Julião da Barra) and the yacht harbour, in addition to other local parks and green spaces. The modern Parque dos Poetas ('Poets' Park'), a green space with statues of Portuguese poets and writers, is also one of the ex-libris of Oeiras. Many of the former town centres have been recovered, displaying monuments and tourist-oriented venues for leisure, cultural, gastronomic and social events (for example the town of Paço de Arcos).

=== Monuments ===
- Marquis of Pombal's Palace
- Lime kilns from the Middle Ages (Fornos da Cal)

=== Parks ===
- Oeiras Municipal Park
- Poets' Park

== Arts & culture ==
=== Festivals ===
- NOS Alive
- EDP Cool Jazz

=== Sports ===
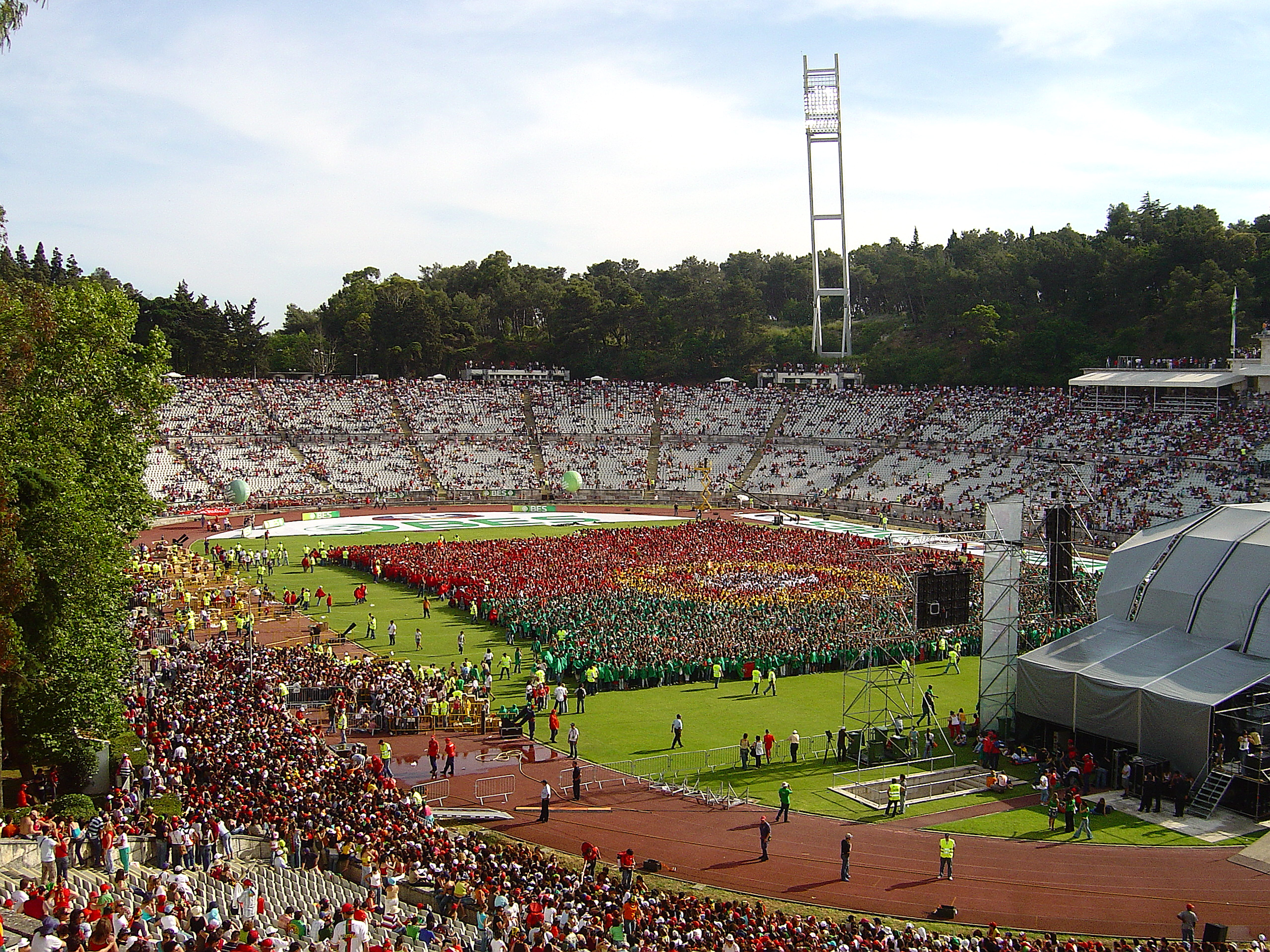
Estádio Nacional

The final matches of the Portuguese men's and women's national football cups traditionally take place in the Estádio Nacional in the Jamor complex. It is also the location of the training centre for the Portugal national team.

The Portugal Open (previously known as Estoril Open) was an ATP and WTA tennis tournament held in the sports complex of Jamor, from 1990 until 2014.

== Education ==
=== Higher education ===
- Escola Náutica Infante D. Henrique - in Paço de Arcos
- FMH - Faculdade de Motricidade Humana (School of Human Motricity) - in Jamor
- Instituto Superior Técnico (Taguspark) - in Porto Salvo
- University New Atlântica - in Barcarena

=== Research ===
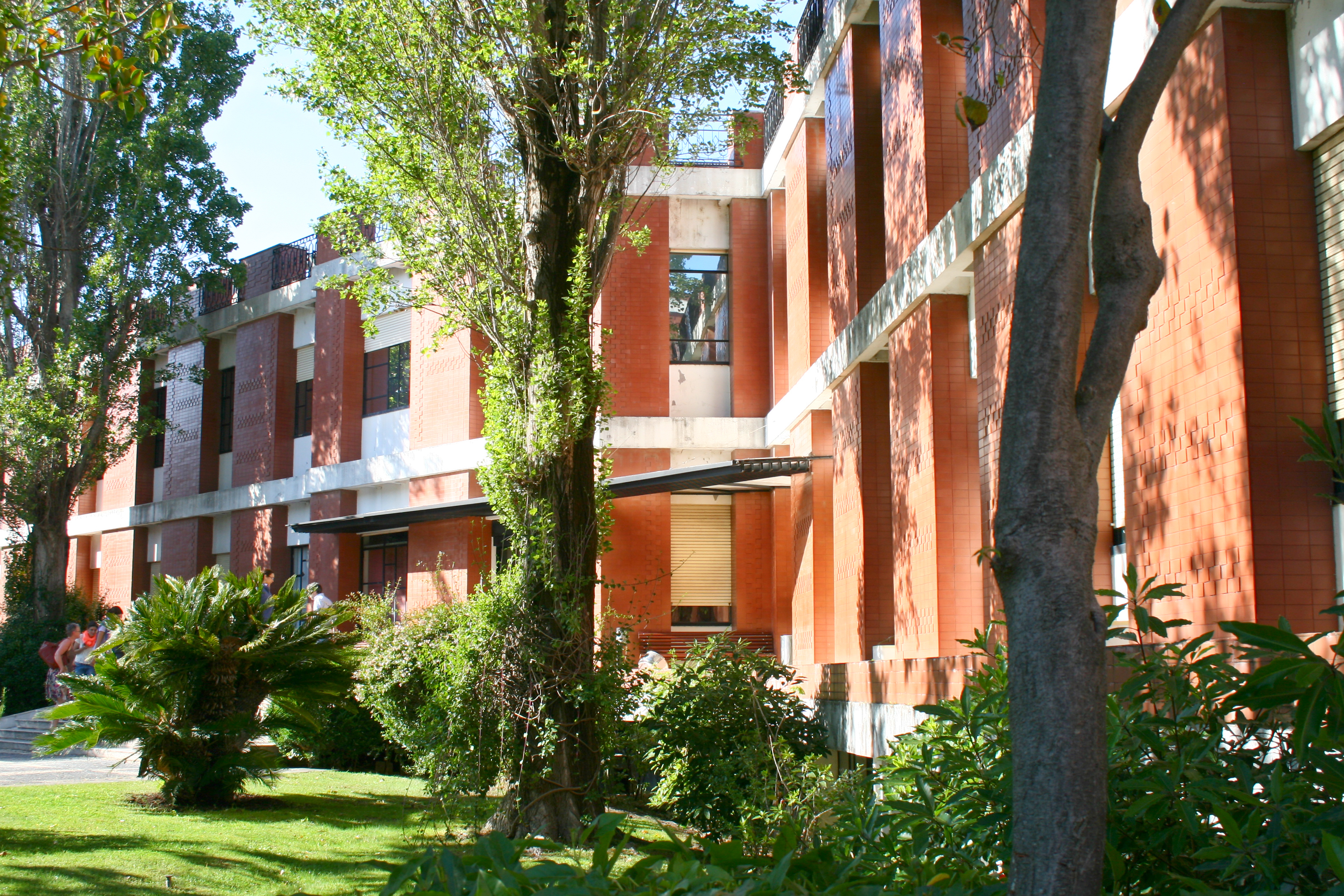
IGC - Instituto Gulbenkian de Ciência scientific research campus in Oeiras.

- Instituto Gulbenkian de Ciência (IGC)
- Instituto de Tecnologia Química e Biológica (ITQB)
- Instituto de Biologia Experimental e Tecnológica (IBET)
- Instituto de Investigação das Pescas e do Mar (IPIMAR)
- Instituto Nacional de Investigação Agrária e Veterinária (INIAV)

=== Others ===
- Instituto Español Giner de los Ríos (Spanish international school) - in Algés, Linda-a-Velha e Cruz Quebrada-Dafundo
- Oeiras International School - in Barcarena

== Infrastructure ==
=== Transportation ===
The A5 motorway passes through Oeiras, providing a highway connection to Cascais and Lisbon.

The municipality is served by the Cascais Line, a suburban railway line the runs along the Estoril Coast west from Lisbon. There are six railway stations on the Cascais Line in the municipality, including Oeiras Station that serves the parish centre.

Oeiras formerly contained the SATUOeiras people mover that connected Oeiras Parque Shopping Center with Paço de Arcos. The line operated between 2004 and 2015.

== International relations ==
Oeiras is twinned with:

- Benguela, Angola
- Gebze, Turkey
- Inhambane, Mozambique
- Mindelo, Cape Verde
- Mohammedia, Morocco
- Oeiras, Brazil
- Príncipe, São Tomé and Príncipe
- Quinhámel, Guinea-Bissau
- Saint-Étienne, France

== Notable people ==
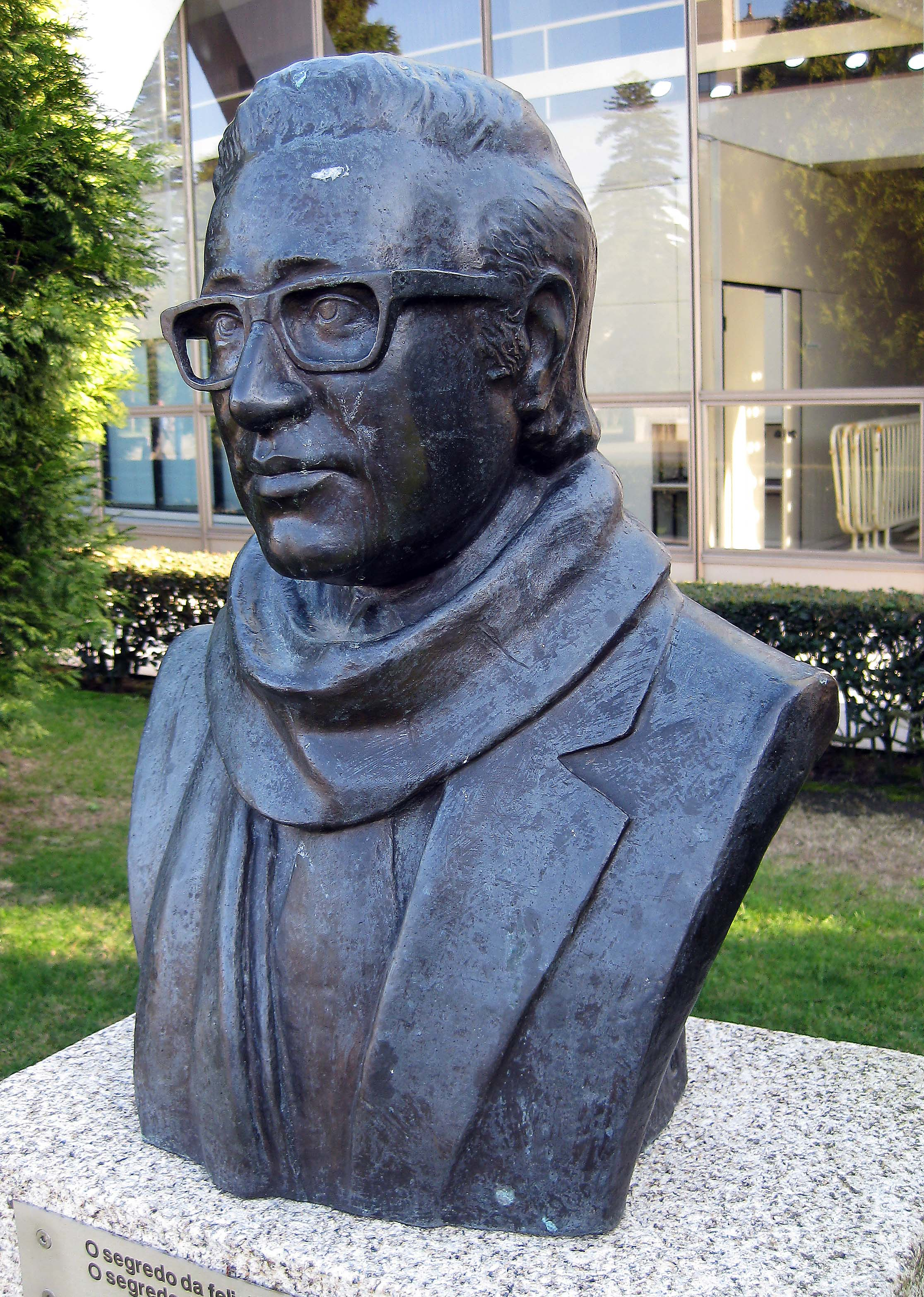
Adelino Amaro da Costa

- Carlos Eugénio Correia da Silva, Count of Paço de Arcos (1834–1905) a Portuguese statesman.
- Luísa Fialho (1839–1891) a Portuguese theatre actor
- João José Sinel de Cordes (1867–1930) a Portuguese general and politician.
- Adelino Amaro da Costa (1943–1980) a Portuguese politician.
- Antonio Alonso Martinez (born 1963) a Portuguese/ Spanish painter
- Camané (born 1966) a vocalist and male fado singer
- Helder Moutinho (born 1969) a Portuguese singer and songwriter in the Fado genre

=== Sport ===
- Fernando Peres (1943–2019) a footballer and manager with 314 club caps and 27 for Portugal
- Nélson Moutinho (born 1959) a Portuguese former footballer with 424 club caps
- Ricardo Pedroso (born 1977) middle-distance freestyle swimmer, competed at 2000 Summer Olympics
- Sérgio Paulinho (born 1980) a Portuguese road bicycle racer
- Marcos Chuva (born 1989) a long jumper, competed at the 2012 Summer Olympics
- Diogo Antunes (born 1992) a Portuguese 100 metres sprinter
- Daniel Podence (born 1995) a footballer who plays for Wolverhampton Wanderers F.C. and has almost 200 club caps
- Pedro Perino (born 2005) a Portuguese-Mozambican racing driver

== See also ==
- Salvem o surf
