= Oeiras e São Julião da Barra, Paço de Arcos e Caxias =

- Civil parish
- Location in Portugal
- Coordinates: 38.692°N 9.313°W
- Country: Portugal
- Region: Lisbon
- Metropolitan area: Lisbon
- District: Lisbon
- Municipality: Oeiras

Area
  - Total: 13.53 km^{2} (5.22 sq mi)

Population (2011)
  - Total: 58,149
  - Density: 4,300/km^{2} (11,000/sq mi)
- Time zone: UTC+00:00 (WET)
  - Summer (DST): UTC+01:00 (WEST)

Oeiras e São Julião da Barra, Paço de Arcos e Caxias is a civil parish in the municipality of Oeiras, Portugal. It was formed in 2013 by the merger of the former parishes Oeiras e São Julião da Barra, Paço de Arcos and Caxias. The population in 2011 was 33 827, in an area of 6.5 km².
