= Portela de Mogos Cromlech =

Neolithic stone circle in Portugal

- Portela dos Mogos
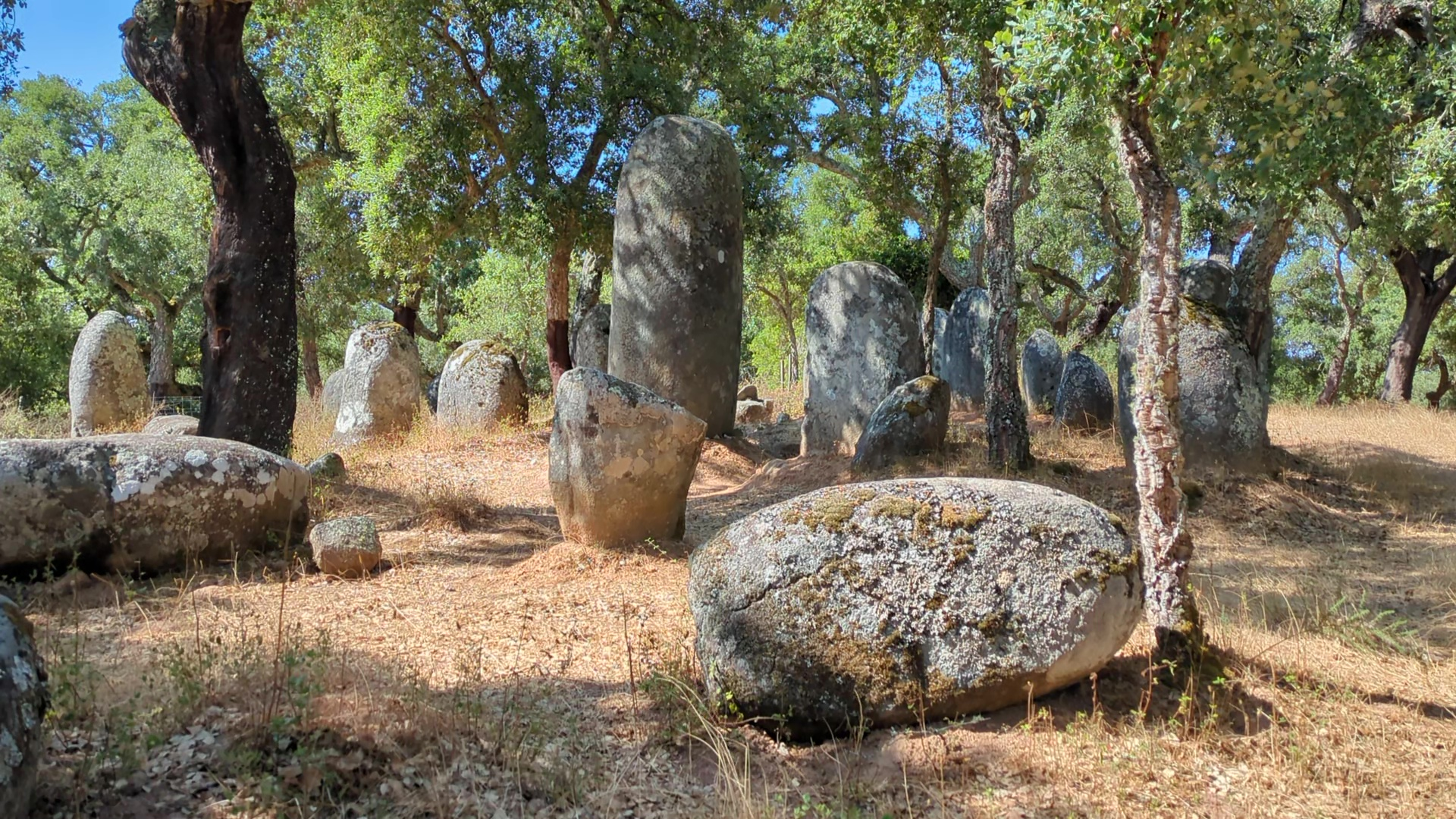
- Interactive map of Portela de Mogos Cromlech
- 38°37′36″N 8°01′32″W
- Type: Stone circle
- Periods: Neolithic; re-used Chalcolithic; Bronze Age
- Location: Évora District, Portugal

History
- Built: c. 4500 BCE

Site notes
- Excavation dates: 1995–96
- Discovered: 1966
- Condition: Semi-restored
- Public access: Yes, but on private land

The Portela de Mogos Cromlech, or stone circle, is one of several megalithic monuments in the Évora District of the Alentejo region in southeastern Portugal. It is believed to date back to the 5th millennium BCE.

== Description ==
The stone circle is situated on a hilltop about 20 kilometres northwest of the city of Évora at an altitude of approximately 350 metres. Both the Vale Maria do Meio Cromlech and the Antas da Valeira dolmens are located about two kilometres to the east, and the larger, and better known, Almendres Cromlech (often referred to as the Stonehenge of Portugal) lies about 10 km to the southwest.

The cromlech consists of 40 stones organised in two concentric ovals with diameters of 12.5–15 metres and 5 metres, oriented east-west. To the east there is an alignment of an additional six stones, possibly part of a third circle. The stones that make up this enclosure were carved from granodiorites, which came from a maximum of one kilometre away. They are mainly ovoid in shape and have an average length of about 1.74 m. Twenty-one of the stones stand upright; the others lie on the ground. Levelled parts of several of the menhirs were decorated with different motifs, such as dimples, staffs or poles, incised lines, zigzags, circular shapes and anthropomorphic representations, similar to those identified in the Almendres Cromlech. Archaeologists believe that one of the decorations is of a female figure, as it appears to have breasts.

== Excavations ==
The cromlech was identified in 1966 by Henrique Leonor Pina, who had also identified the Almendres Cromlech. It was excavated by Mário Varela Gomes in 1995/96, who re-erected several of the fallen monoliths. This latter work resulted in the discovery of a chronologically diverse set of artifacts. Three archaeological layers were identified: in the most recent, fragments of medieval and modern ceramics were collected, together with a fragment of a Roman tile and Iron Age ceramics. In the second layer, fragments of bowls with impressed and incised decoration and material attributable to the Bronze Age were found. In the third layer, Neolithic and Chalcolithic ceramics and chipped stone artifacts were evident. A polished stone axe was discovered in the supporting structure of the largest menhir, and an adze was found in the supporting structure of one of the six aligned stones.

== Classification ==
The Portela de Mogos Cromlech is classified as an IIP – Imóvel de Interesse Público (Property of Public Interest).
