= Vale Maria do Meio Cromlech =

Stone circle in Évora, Portugal

- Cromeleque de Vale Maria do Meio
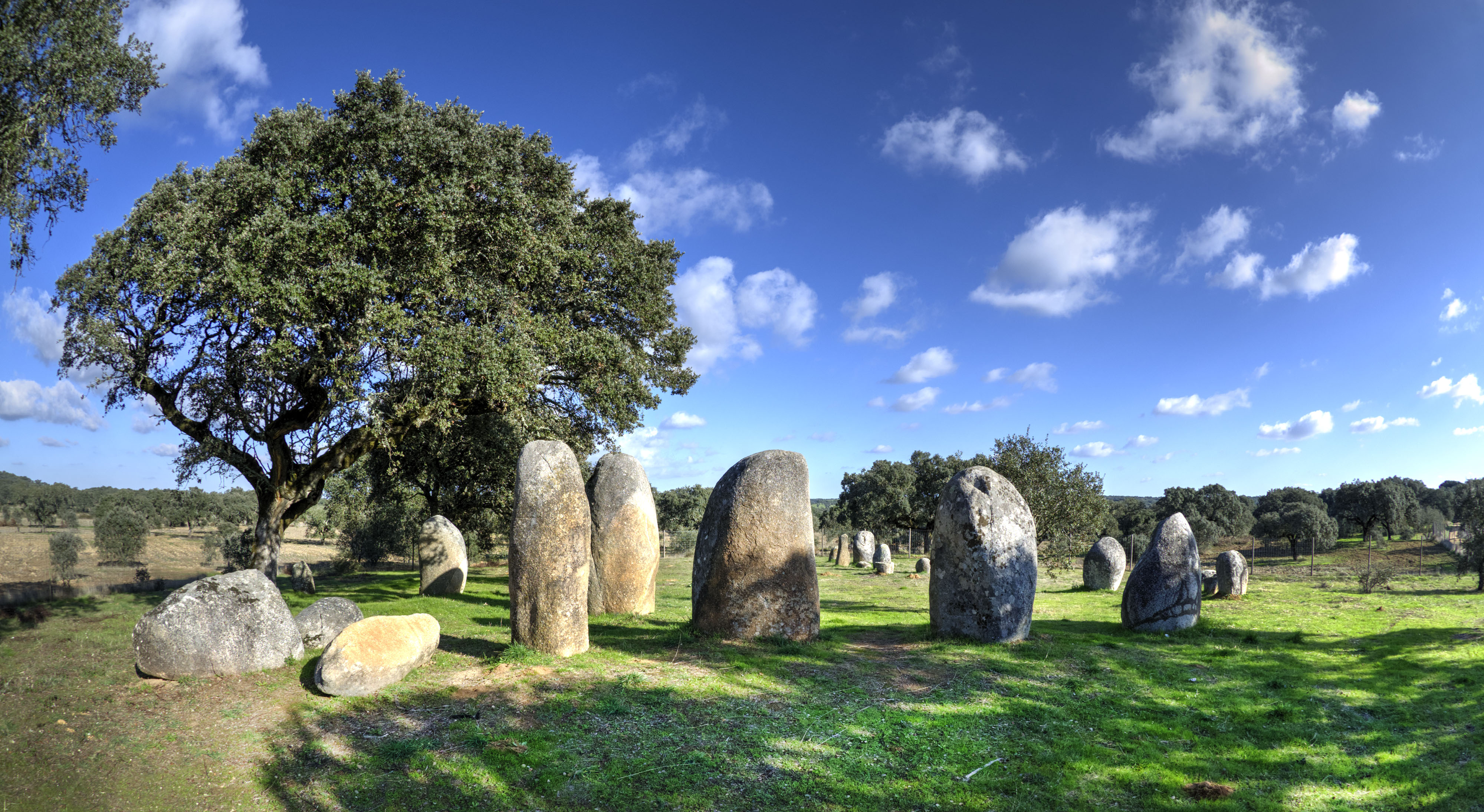
- The stone circle in 2016
- Interactive map of Vale Maria do Meio Cromlech
- 38°37′21″N 8°00′30.6″W
- Type: Cromlech
- Location: Évora, Portugal

History
- Built: c. 4500 BC

Site notes
- Material: Granite
- Length: 37 m (121 ft)
- Width: 25 m (82 ft)
- Excavation dates: July-September 1995
- Archaeologists: Manuel Calado
- Discovered: 1993
- Public access: Private but site can be accessed

The Vale Maria do Meio Cromlech is a megalithic stone circle situated in Évora district in the Alentejo region of Portugal. It is believed to date back to the fifth millennium BCE or earlier, and is classified as a National Monument.

The Vale Maria do Meio cromlech is located in an area with a significant number of megalithic monuments. It is about one kilometer south of the Antas da Valeira, two neolithic dolmen or megalithic tombs, and 1.5km to the east of the Portela de Mogos Cromlech. The Almendres Cromlech, a major megalithic site, is about ten kilometers to the southwest.

The cromlech was identified in 1993 by a team of students from the University of Lisbon, led by Manuel Calado. Excavations in 1995, sponsored by the local authority and led by Prof. Calado, identified 34 granite menhirs, which are predominantly oval in shape and have an average height of 1.74 meters. They are believed to have come from a granite outcrop to the south of the site. Suggesting an astronomical purpose, the stones form an east-west elongated arch, which is about 37 meters long and 25 meters wide, with the largest monoliths being placed at the highest point of the site, to the west.

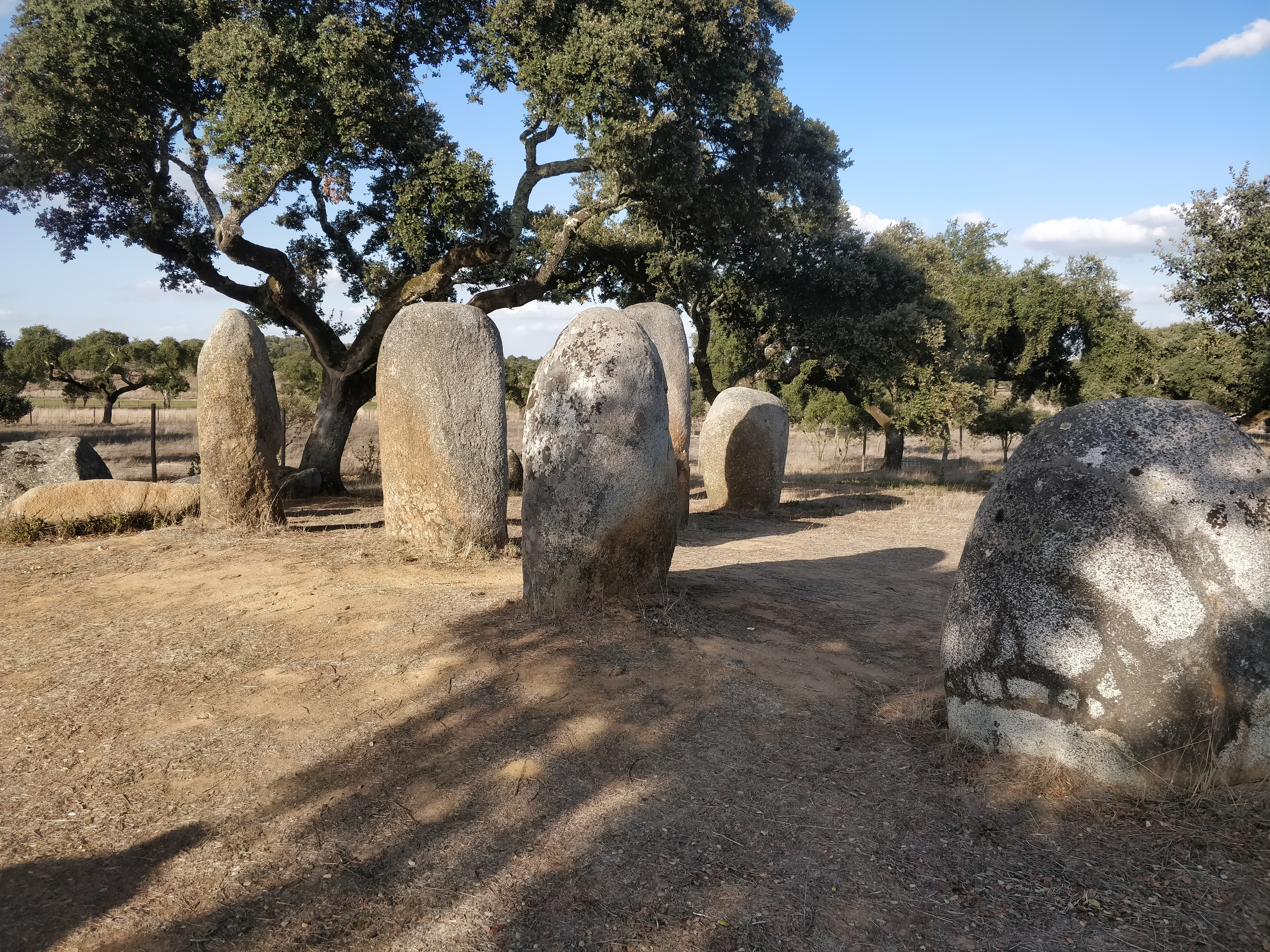
Another view of the cromlech

Most of the stones are well preserved, although some show fractures. Engravings of circles, horseshoes and lunar crescents have been found on two of the menhirs, closely resembling engravings found on the Almendres Cromlech. The arrangement of the menhirs suggested to the archaeologists that this monument was built in two distinct phases. In December 1995, an attempt was made to understand the effort involved in the construction of stone circles. With the help of ropes, logs and 70 volunteers, it proved possible to raise most of the monoliths.

The 1995 excavations involved controlled sampling of soil from different stratigraphic units. The area has been heavily used for agriculture since at least Roman times, which limited the findings, but artifacts collected did include fragments of millstone, ceramics, scrapers, chisels, chips, plates, and splinters. These are all stored at the Unit of Archaeology of the Faculty of Arts of the University of Lisbon.
