= Cromlech =

Megalithic construction made of large stone blocks

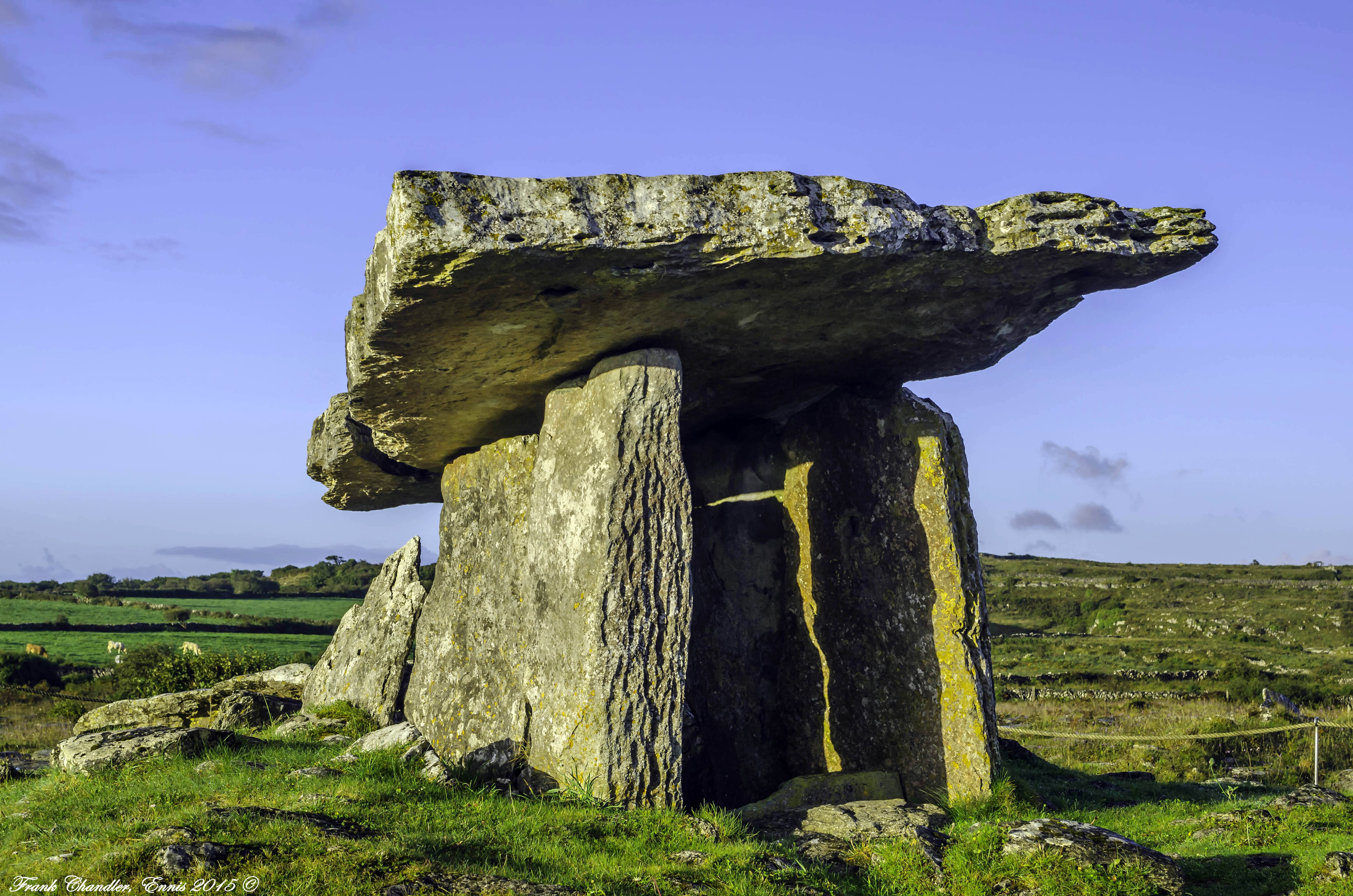
Poulnabrone dolmen, the Burren, County Clare, Ireland. Not a cromlech in contemporary English.

A cromlech (sometimes also spelled "cromleh" or "cromlêh"; cf Welsh crom, "bent"; llech, "slate") is a megalithic construction made of large stone blocks. The word can apply to two different megalithic forms in English, the first being what is now mostly called a dolmen, as William Borlase first denoted in 1769. A good example is at Carn Llechart.

According to A Dictionary of Archaeology (2008) by Ian Shaw the term "cromlech" in this traditional sense "has fallen out of use in Britain".

The second meaning of the name "cromlech" in English refers to large stone circles such as those found in Odry in Poland or among the Carnac stones in Brittany, France. "Cromlech" has long been the usual term for these in many other languages (such as Azerbaijani, Armenian, French, Greek, Indonesian, Italian, Romanian, and Spanish) where it exclusively denotes a megalithic stone circle, whereas the word "dolmen" is used to refer to the type of megalithic altar tomb sometimes indicated by the English "cromlech". Also, more recently in English, scholars such as Aubrey Burl use "cromlech" as a synonym for "megalithic stone circle".

The French recognise the Anglo-Welsh origin of the word "anglais cromlech, du gallois crom, rond, et llech, pierre" according to the online Larrouse, who show Stonehenge as their illustration.

== List ==
- Almendres Cromlech, the Cromlech of the Almendres megalithic complex, near Évora, Portugal
- Dinas Cromlech, a rock outcrop in the Llanberis Pass, Snowdonia, Wales
- Dolni Glavanak Cromlech, an oval stone circle near Dolni Glavanak, Bulgaria

== See also ==
- Crom Dubh
