= Antas da Valeira =

Megalithic site near Evora, Portugal

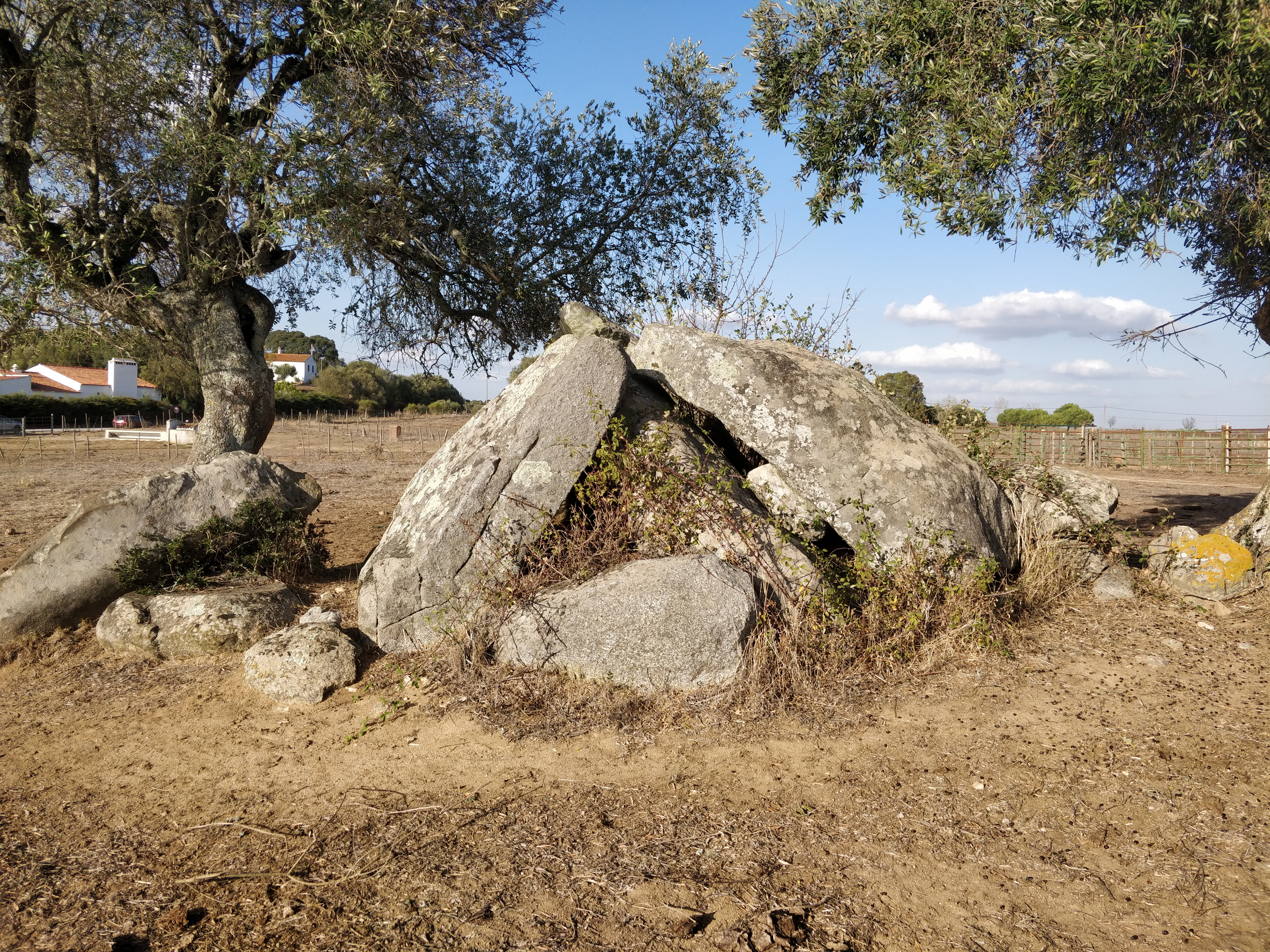
- Anta da Valeira 1
- Interactive map of Antas da Valeira
- 38°38′15″N 8°00′11″W
- Type: Dolmen
- Periods: Late Neolithic; Chalcolithic
- Location: Valeira, Nossa Senhora da Graça do Divor, Évora District, Alentejo Region, Portugal

Site notes
- Archaeologists: no excavation to date
- Public access: Private land, but can be accessed

The Antas da Valeira are two Chalcolithic dolmen, or burial chambers, about 100 metres apart, close to the village of Nossa Senhora da Graça do Divor in the Évora district of the Alentejo region of Portugal. Situated in a farm field about one kilometer from the Vale Maria do Meio Cromlech and ten kilometers from the notable megalithic complex of the Almendres Cromlech, these dolmens are among numerous megalithic sites identified in the Évora area. These two monuments have yet to be studied by archaeologists and are in poor condition.

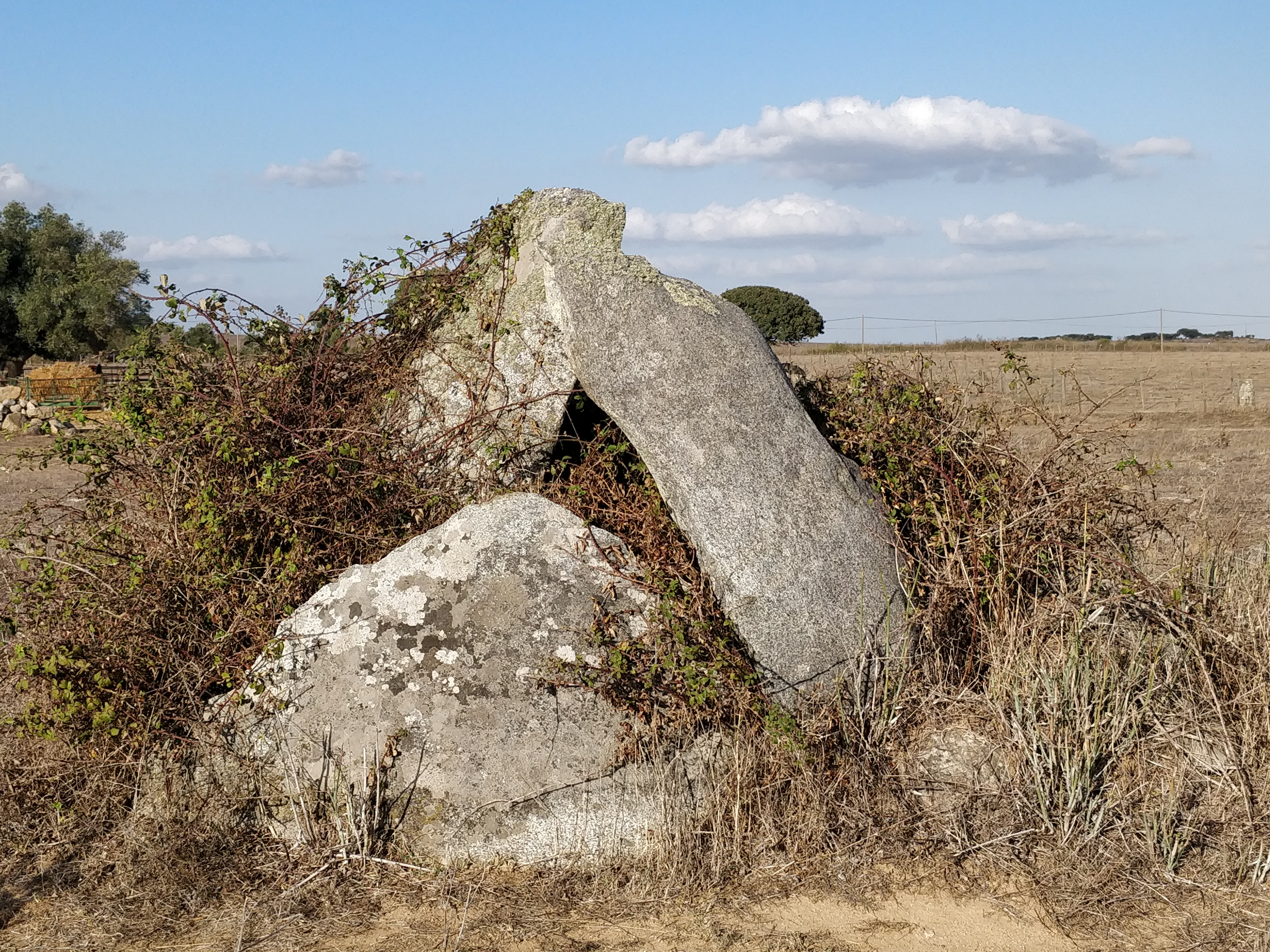
Anta da Valeira2

Anta da Valeira 1 is situated between two olive trees. It consists of a degraded polygonal chamber with traces of an entrance corridor and tumulus. Six large stones or pillars can be seen but all have fallen from their original positions. There is no trace of a capstone or an entrance corridor. Anta da Valeira 2 is also in bad condition. Five large stones that would have served as pillars remain on the site, which has been much affected by agricultural work.
