= Dolni Glavanak =

- Village
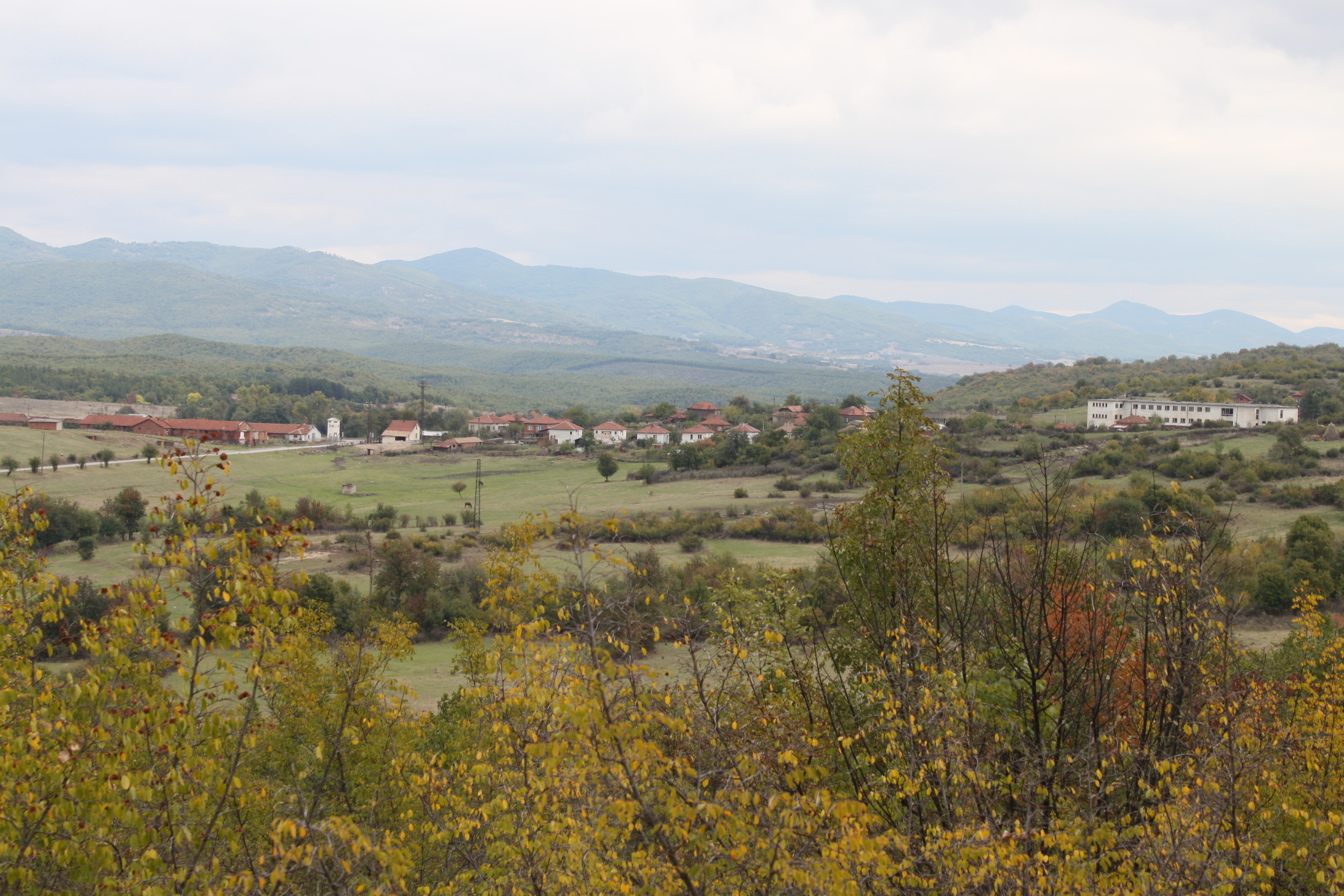
- Panoramic view of Dolni Glavanak

- Location within Bulgaria
- Coordinates: 41°41′N 25°50′E
- Country: Bulgaria
- Province: Haskovo Province
- Municipality: Madzharovo
- Time zone: UTC+2 (EET)
  - Summer (DST): UTC+3 (EEST)

Dolni Glavanak is a village in the municipality of Madzharovo, in Haskovo Province, southern Bulgaria.

A megalithic stone circle, the Dolni Glavanak Cromlech, lies 2 km west of the village. Constructed from 15 pyramid-shaped stones, the formation is roughly circular in shape and has a diameter of 10 metres. The stone circle dates to the Early Iron Age (8th-7th century BCE). It was discovered in 1998 by archaeologist Georgi Nehrizov.
