= Dolni Glavanak Cromlech =

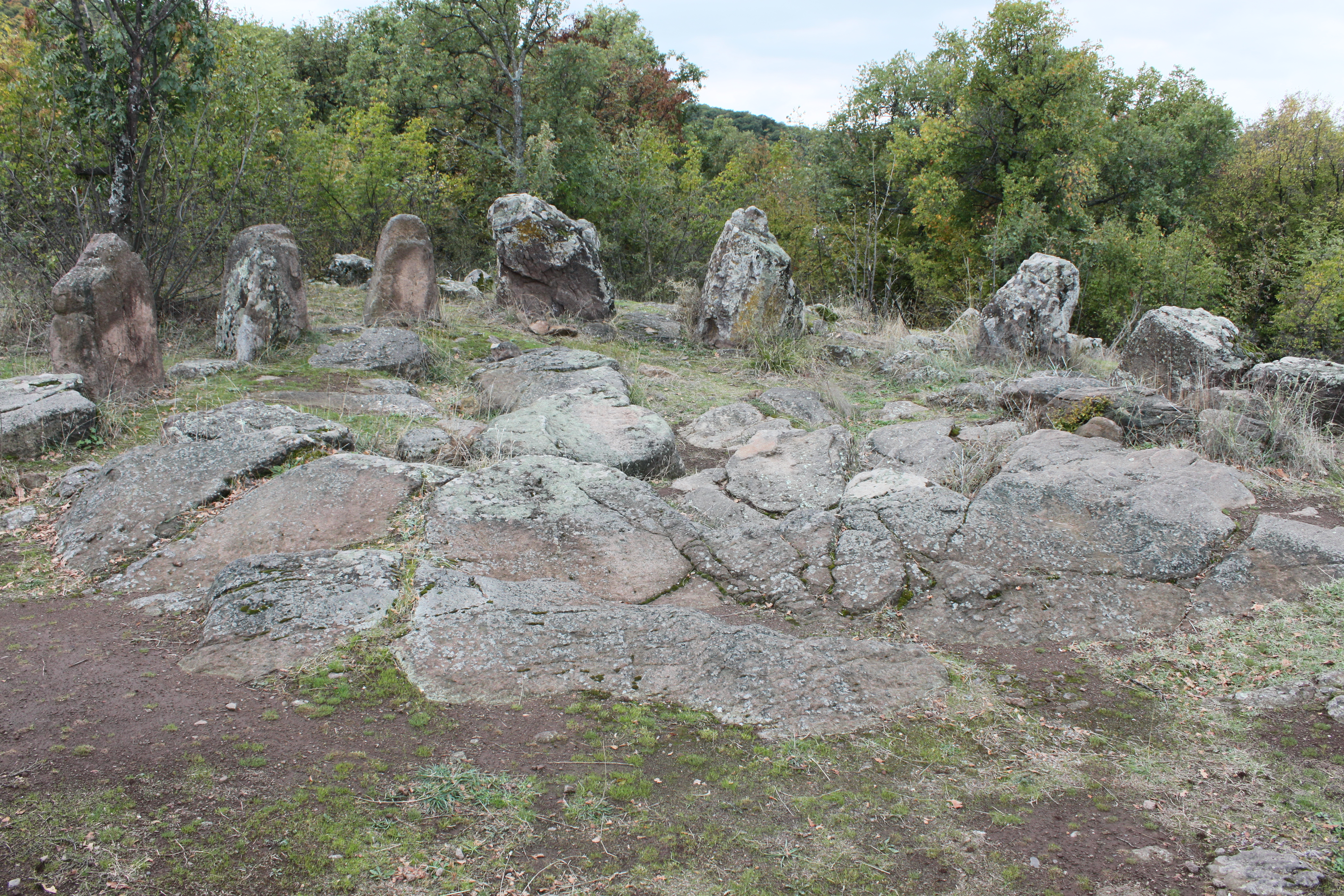

- Location within Bulgaria
- 41.681°N 25.812817°E
- Type: Cromlech
- Periods: Iron Age
- Location: Rhodope Mountains
- Region: Bulgaria

The Dolni Glavanak Cromlech is an oval stone circle located 2 kilometres west of village of Dolni Glavanak, some 12 kilometres from town of Madzharovo, in Bulgaria. The site is referred to as a cromlech by analogy with similar monuments in Western Europe, but it is the only structure of its kind known in the country.

== Description ==
The site is situated on a low ridge-top above the left bank of the Arda river. It is enclosed on all sides and isolated from external influences. The circle consists of vertical, roughly-shaped, blocks of local hard volcanic rock (rhyodacite). The blocks are trapezoidal in shape, and are approximately 1.2 to 1.5 metres tall, and around 0.9 to 1.2 metres wide at the base, and 0.4 to 0.6 metres thick. Nine blocks still stand and three are now fallen. The vertical blocks are spaced at regular intervals, with smaller stones placed horizontally between them. The circle has an internal diameter of about 10 metres. There is an entrance on the southeast side.

There are two smaller structures in the vicinity. One is a 3-metre-wide oval enclosure constructed out of stones located around 15 metres southeast of the cromlech. The other is a slightly larger oval enclosure of the same type, with a diameter of about 6 metres, located around 19 metres south of the cromlech.

== Excavations ==
The site was discovered and excavated by Georgi Nehrizov in around 1998–1999. The excavations uncovered decorated pottery, as well as bronze artefacts (a fibula and a pin). These date the construction of the cromlech to the second phase of the Early Iron Age (8th–6th centuries BC). The two stone enclosures were in use around the same time, and finds of burnt human bone suggest a funereal use. The site continued in use into the late Iron Age.
