= Almendres Cromlech =

Stone circle in Évora, Portugal

Cromlech of the Almendres
- Cromlech of the Almendres Estate
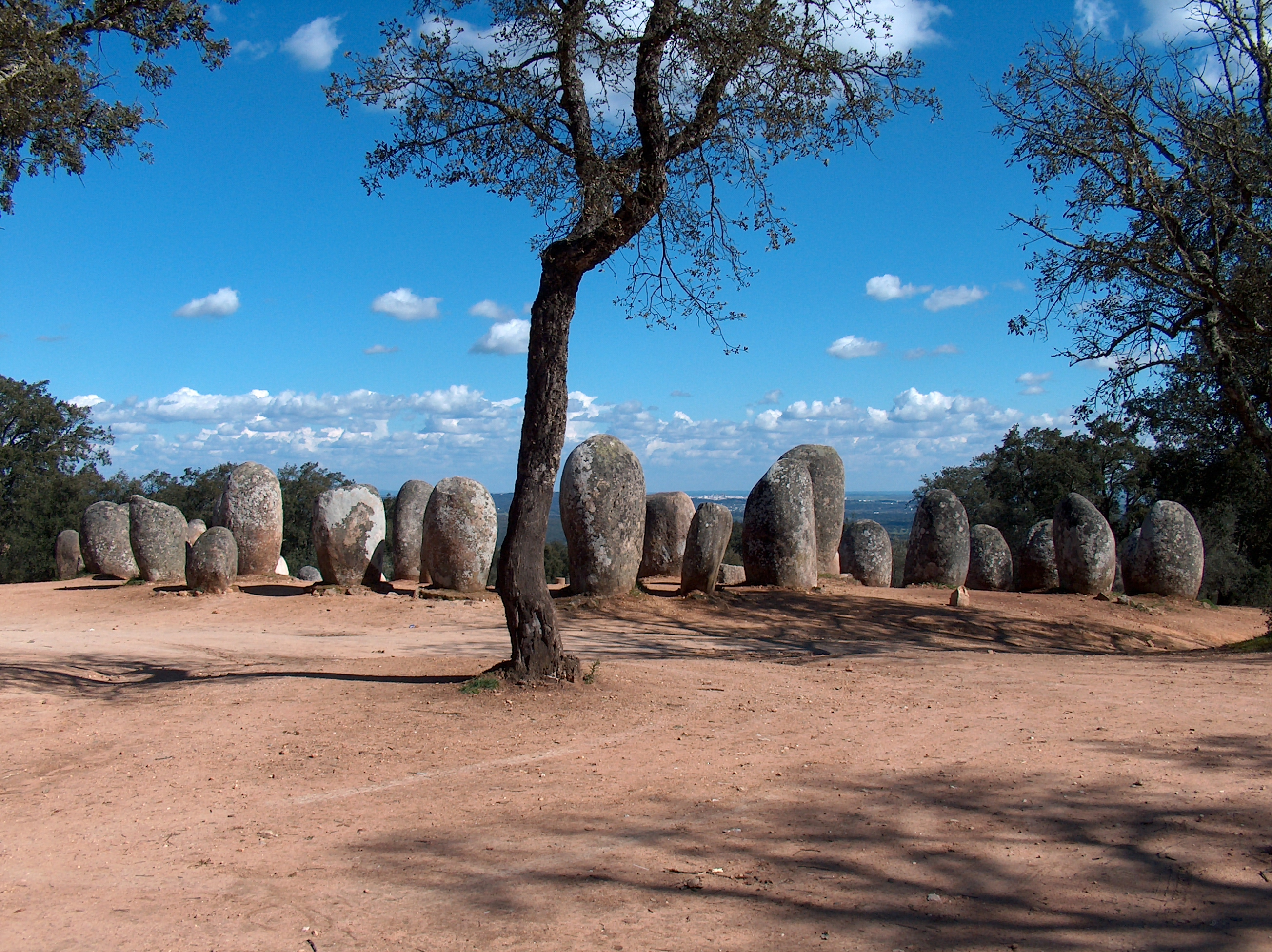
- Interactive map of Cromlech of the Almendres
- 38°33′27″N 8°03′40″W
- Type: Cromlech
- Location: Évora, Alentejo Central, Alentejo, Portugal

Site notes
- Elevation: 400 m (1,300 ft)
- Length: 62.4 m (205 ft)
- Width: 32 m (105 ft)
- Archaeologists: unknown
- Owner: Portuguese Republic
- Public access: Private

The Cromlech of the Almendres (Portuguese: Cromeleque dos Almendres/Cromeleque na Herdade dos Almendres) is a megalithic complex (commonly known as the Almendres Cromlech), located 4.5 road km WSW of the village of Nossa Senhora de Guadalupe, in the civil parish of Nossa Senhora da Tourega e Nossa Senhora de Guadalupe, municipality of Évora, in the Portuguese Alentejo. The largest existing group of structured menhirs in the Iberian Peninsula (and one of the largest in Europe), this archaeological site consists of several megalithic structures: cromlechs and menhir stones, that belong to the so-called "megalithic universe of Évora", with clear parallels to other cromlechs in Évora District, such as the Portela de Mogos Cromlech and the Vale Maria do Meio Cromlech.

== History ==
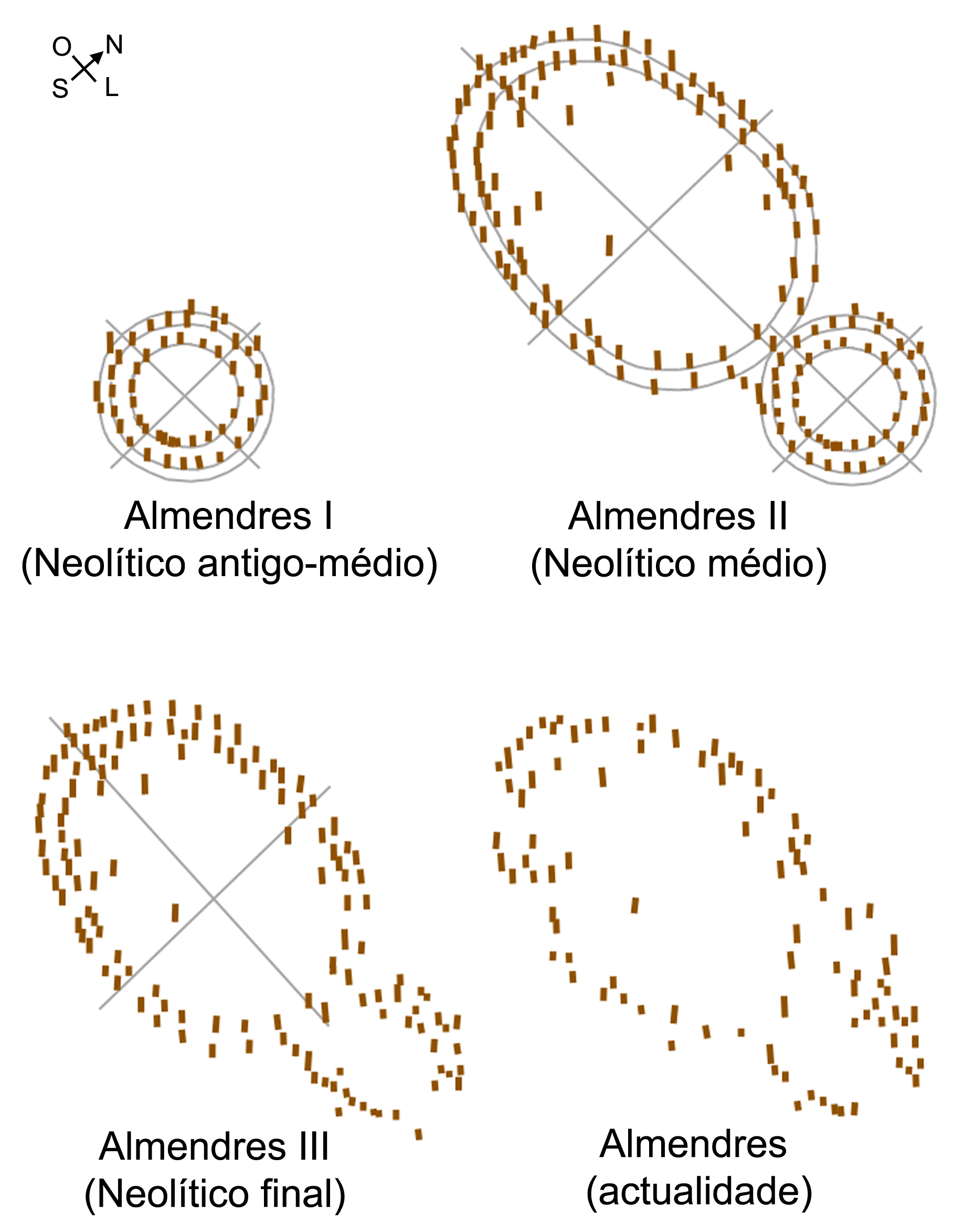
Scheme showing the evolution of the Almendres Cromlech (Évora, Portugal) from the early Neolithic until today

The construction of these structures dates back to the 6th millennium BC. They were rediscovered in 1966 by Henrique Leonor Pina, who was carrying out field work relating to the country's geological charts.

The excavation of the site unearthed a series of both megalithic and neolithic construction phases; Almendres I 6000 BC (Early Neolithic), Almendres II 5000 BC (Middle Neolithic), and Almendres III 4000 BC (Late Neolithic). The relative chronology of the cromlech and menhirs is extremely complex and covers a period from the Neolithic to Chalcolithic. It is believed that the monument either had a religious/ceremonial purpose or functioned as a primitive astronomical observatory.

== Architecture ==
Located off the national roadway from Évora to Montemor-o-Novo, the cromlech is situated just after the village of Guadalupe, in Herdade dos Almendres (the Almendres Estate). It is located in the southwest of the property, while the menhir is situated on the eastern limits of the estate facing the sunrise over the Serra de Monfurado, isolated from the local community. A pedestrian trail was defined by the local municipal council, and integrated into the municipality's "megalithic route" that follows the prehistoric remnants through the region.

The complex, organized in a circular pattern, is marked by a forest of about 95 granite monoliths, deposited in small groups. The older (Early Neolithic) monoliths are formed as two or three concentric circles of smaller monoliths in the western part of the complex, while the Middle Neolithic structures consist of two ellipses (irregular but concentric) and large menhirs. In the Late Neolithic phase the earlier constructions suffered modifications, transforming it into a site for social or religious rituals. Ninety-two of the menhirs form two grounds, which were built and oriented to different directions associated with the Equinox.

Many of the stones were unearthed where they stood/fell, and were rebuilt/erected by Mario Varela Gomes, based on criteria established from research and rediscovery of the original bases.

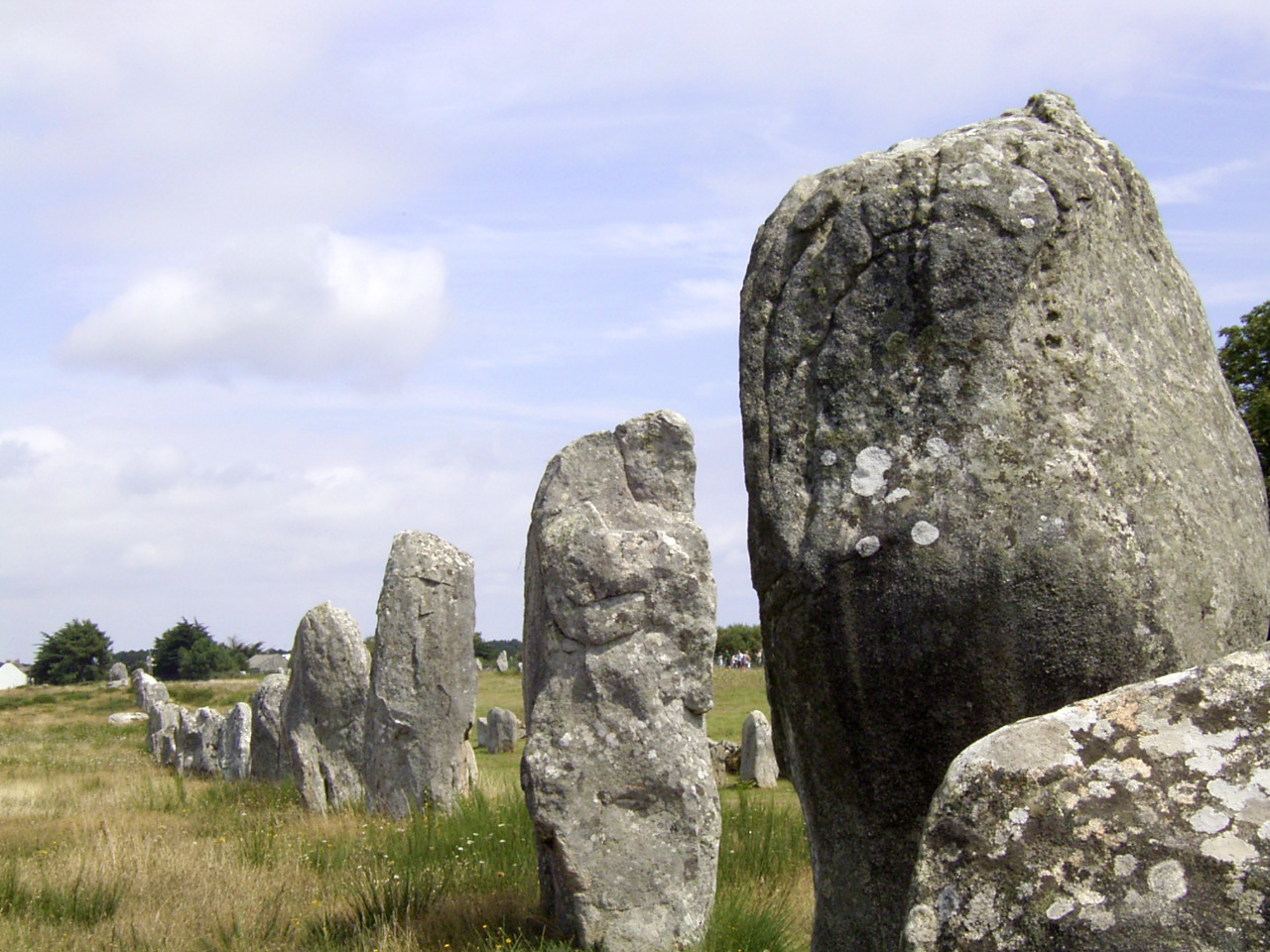
Ménec Alignment, Carnac Stones

The complex's latitudinal position is about the same as the maximum moon elongation (38.55 degrees for 1500 BC); comparably, another latitude where this occurs is associated with Stonehenge (51.18 degrees for 2000 BC). The Carnac stones (Breton: Steudadoù Karnag) in Brittany, northwestern France, also share similarities with the Almendres Stones. The erection periods appear not very far apart and materials, layout, shape, positioning of stones likely erected by pre-Celtic people probably around 3300 BC, but some may date to as early as 4500 BC. None of these sites are still fully explained: burial grounds, places of Pagan worship, sacrificial rituals, rough calendars to mark the Summer solstice are some of their probable functions.

Although there are many large solitary 2.5 to 3.5 metres rounded/elliptical stones, most are smaller and formed into groups. The cromlech occupies an area of 70 by 40 metres, oriented along an axial alignment northwest to southeast. The columns show signs of profound erosion, especially in those surfaces exposed to the elements, although decoration is still visible. These designs take the form of lines and radials, at least two on each stone.

About a dozen monoliths exhibit some form of carved drawings, of which four exhibit only small circular holes. Monolith number 8, with a cut flat top at about breast level and showing several dimples, might have served for finer astronomical observation, specially spring equinox observation, by putting small stones on the dimples. These observations might also be made from stone 39, on the eastern focal point of the elliptic layout. Menhir 48, also exhibits a schematized anthropomorphic representation, surrounded by circles and associated with a crozier.

An isolated single menhir, approximately 4.5 metres tall and 0.9 metres in diameter is located near the residences, or 1400 metres northeast of the main complex. A line from the Almendres Cromlech to this menhir points roughly towards the sunrise in the Winter solstice.

== Views ==
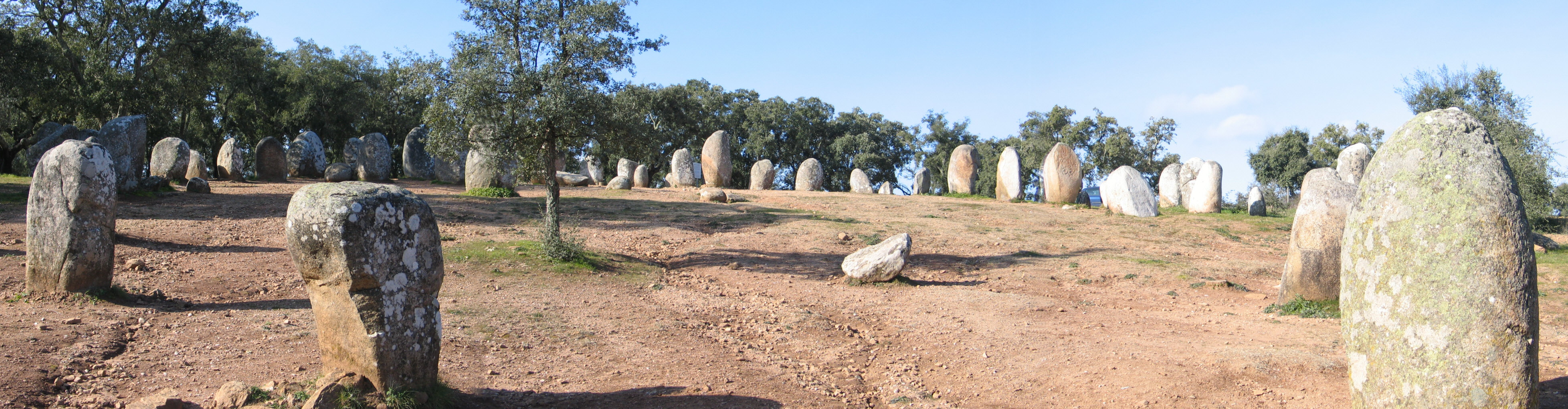
The distribution of the Cromlech of the Almendres

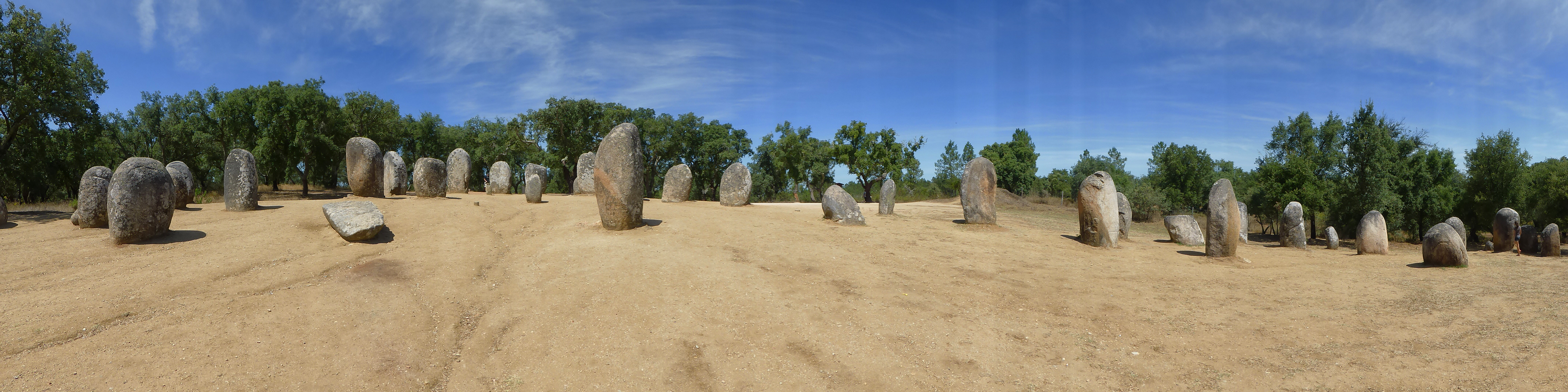
Almendres Cromlech, Évora, Portugal, 2014

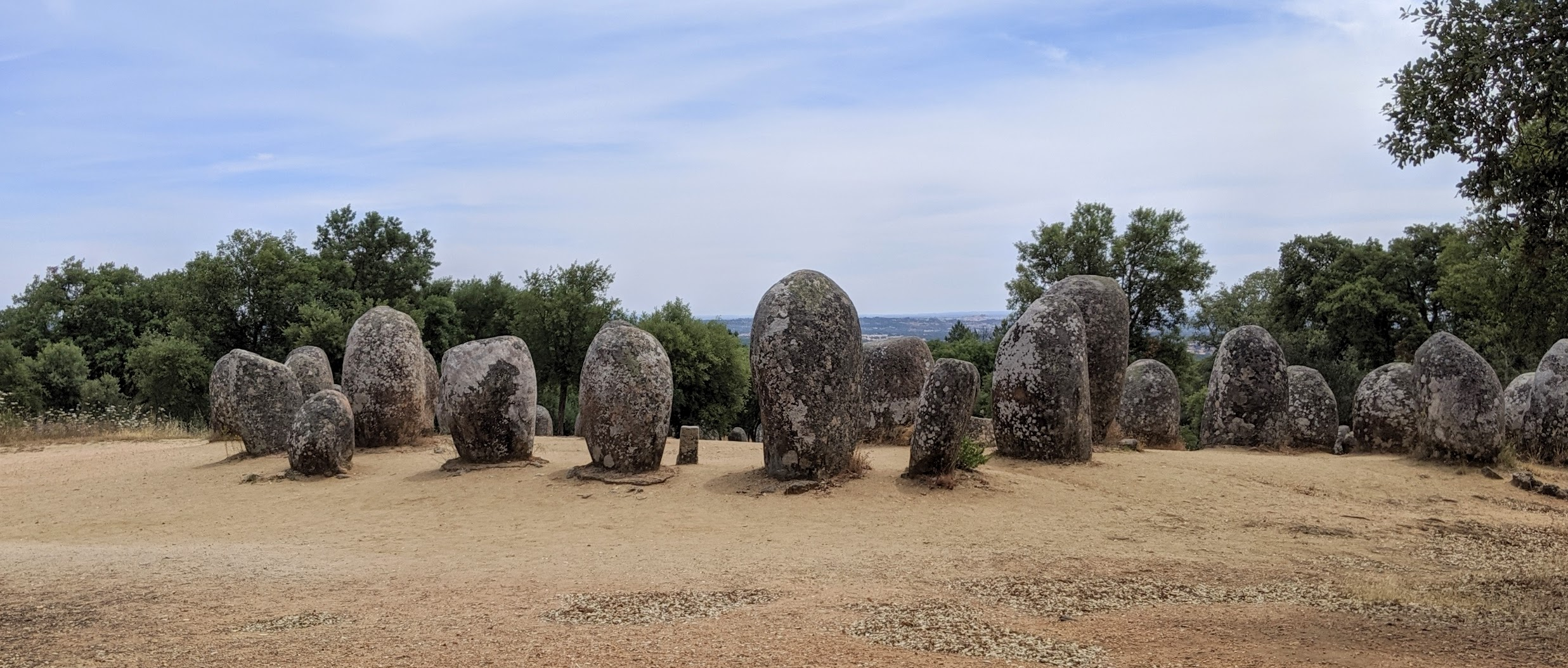
View from the top, 2019

== Gallery ==
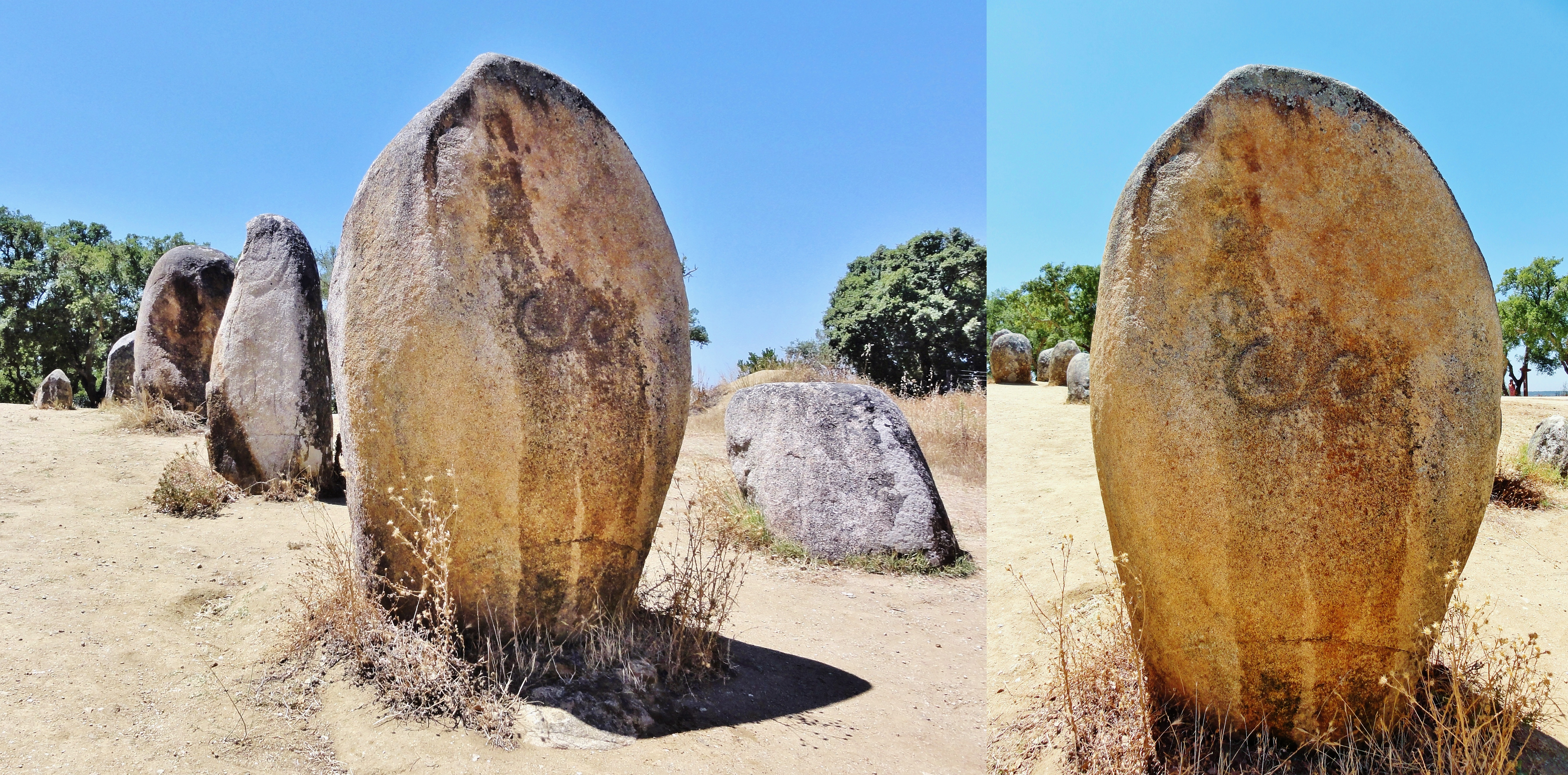
Spirals engraved stone

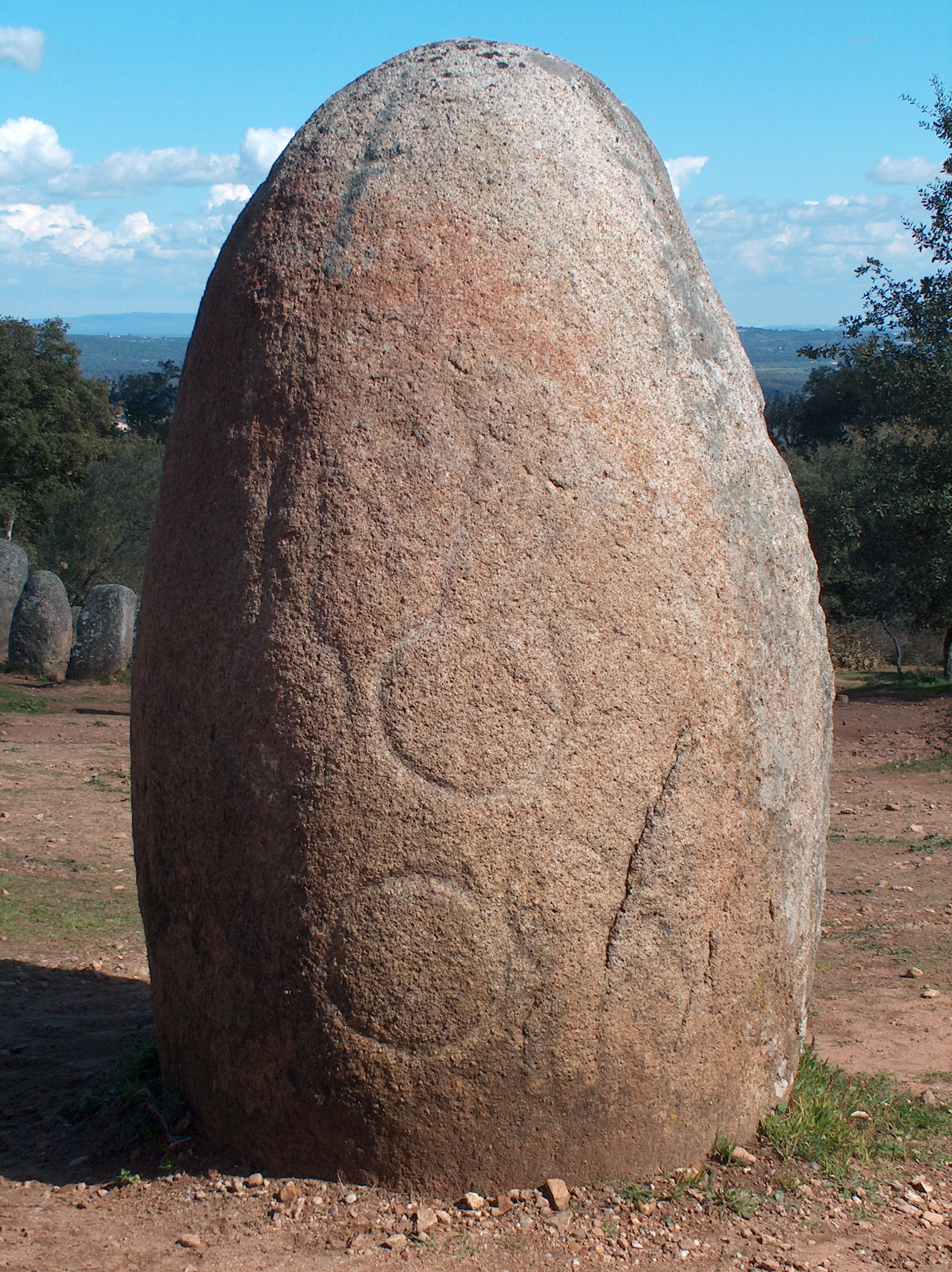
An example of an engraved stone (circles)

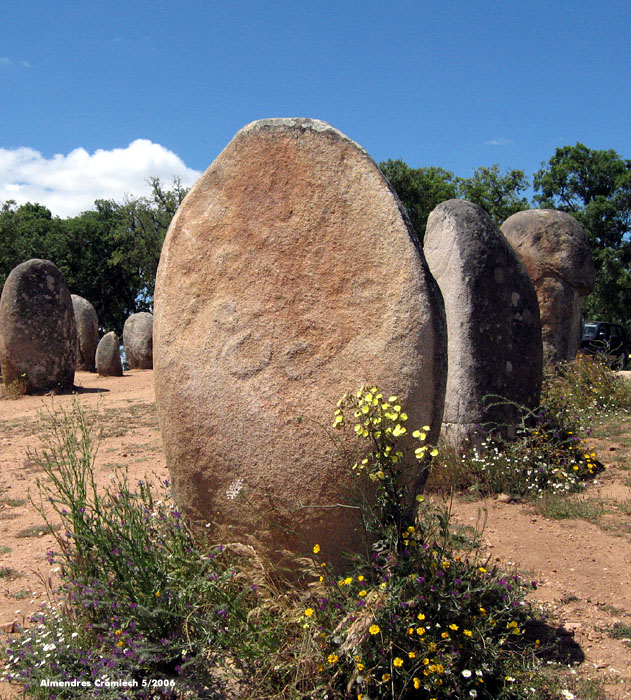
Semi-circular crescents engraved on another stone

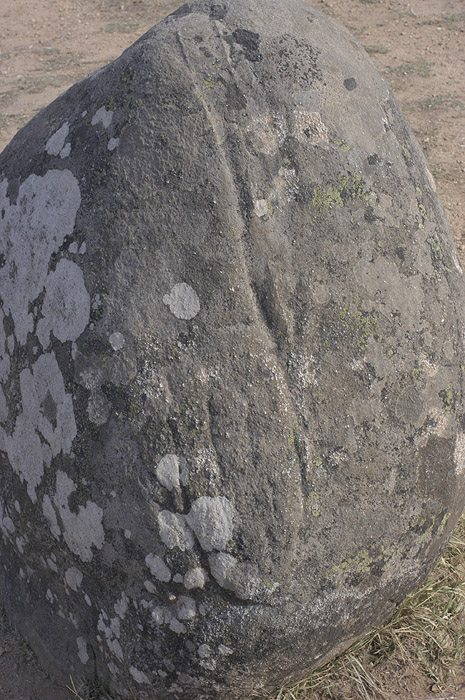
An inverted shepherd's crook: a common motif

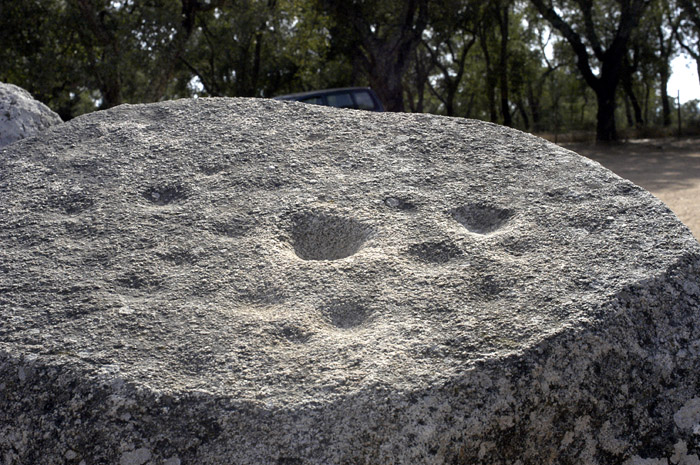
The number 8 monolith with rounded dimples

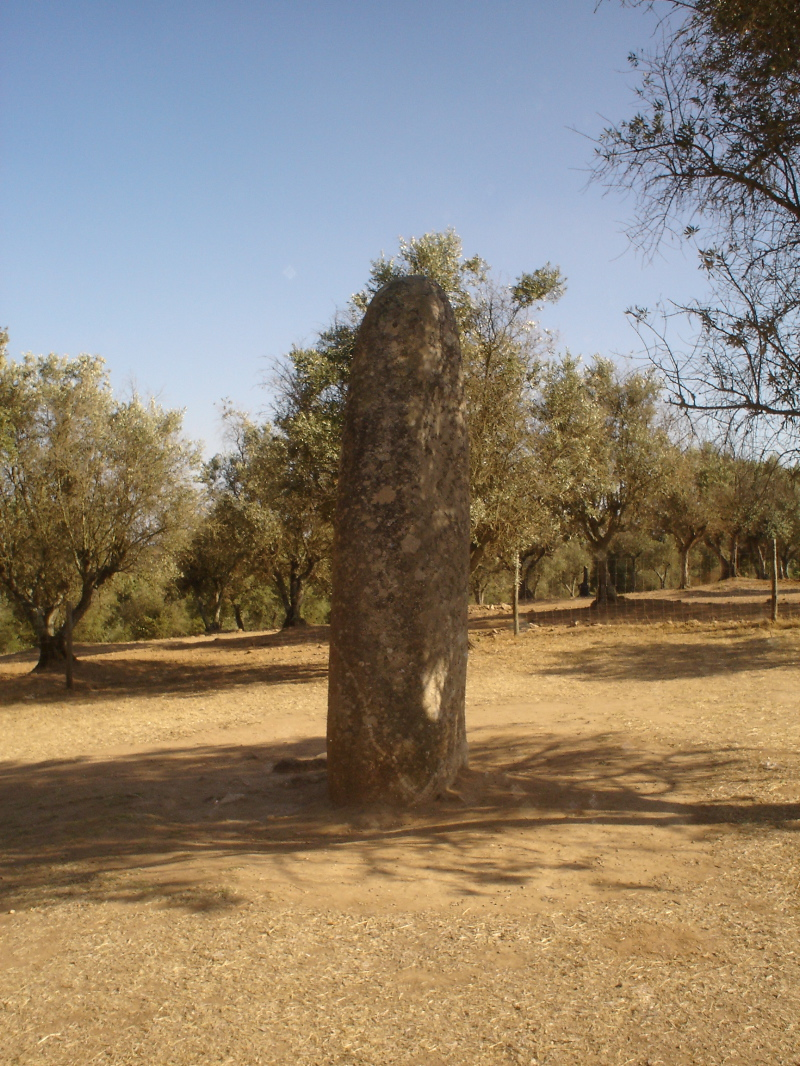
The isolated Menhir of the Almendres

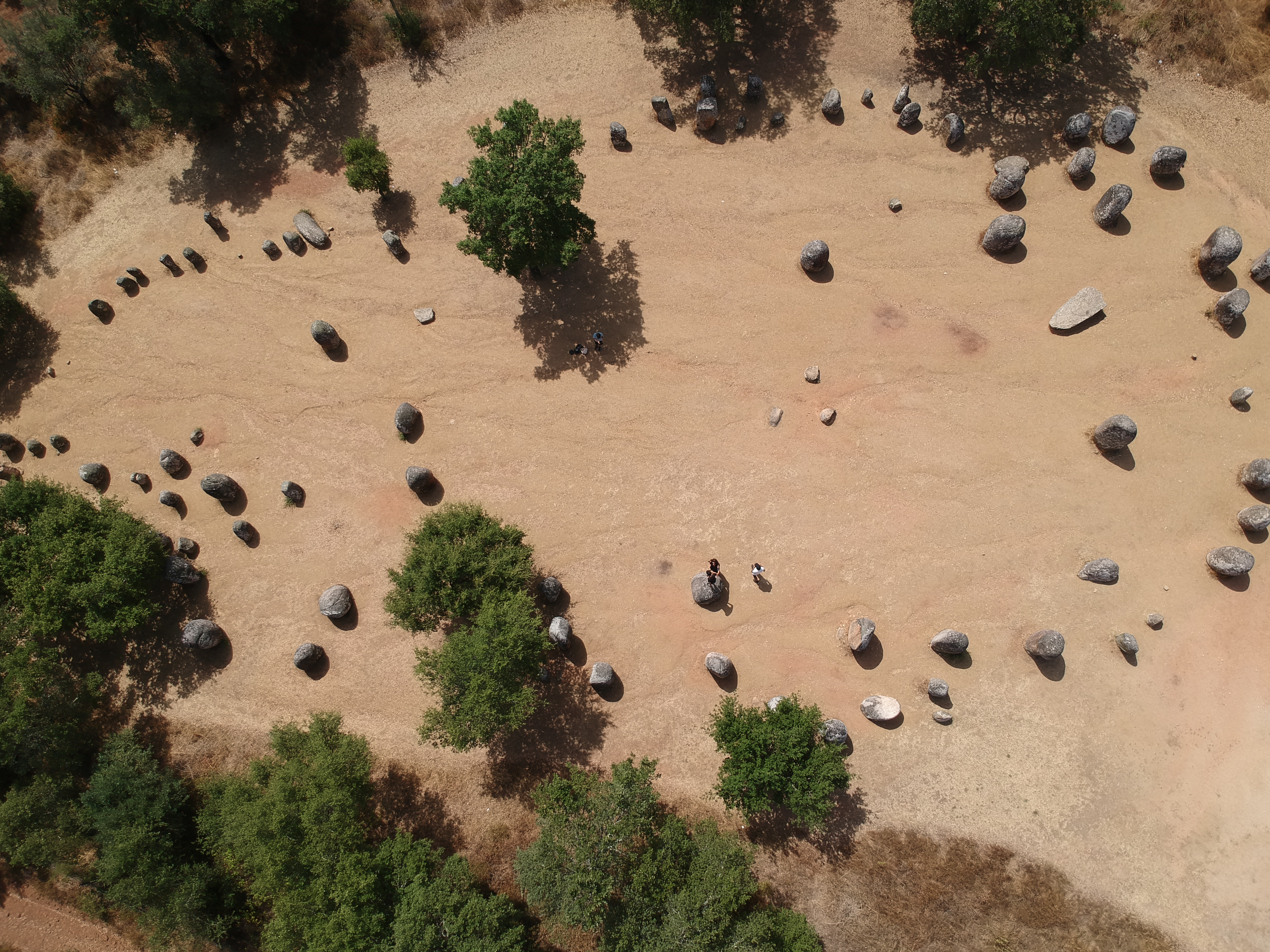
Aerial view
