= Tourism in Lisbon =

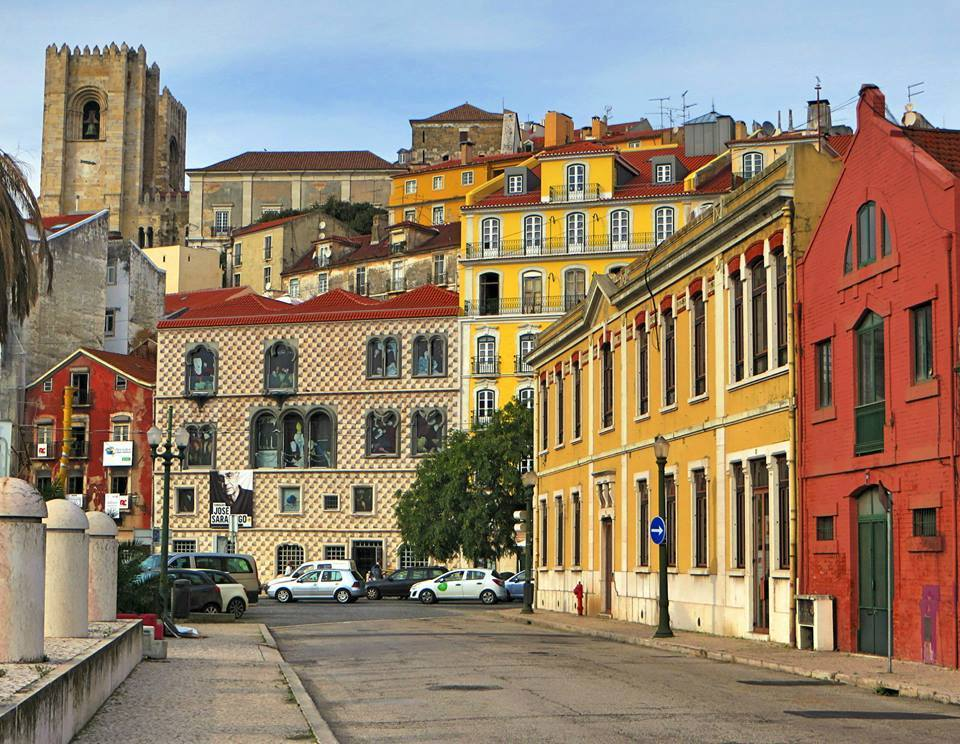
A view of the city with Lisbon's cathedral in the background

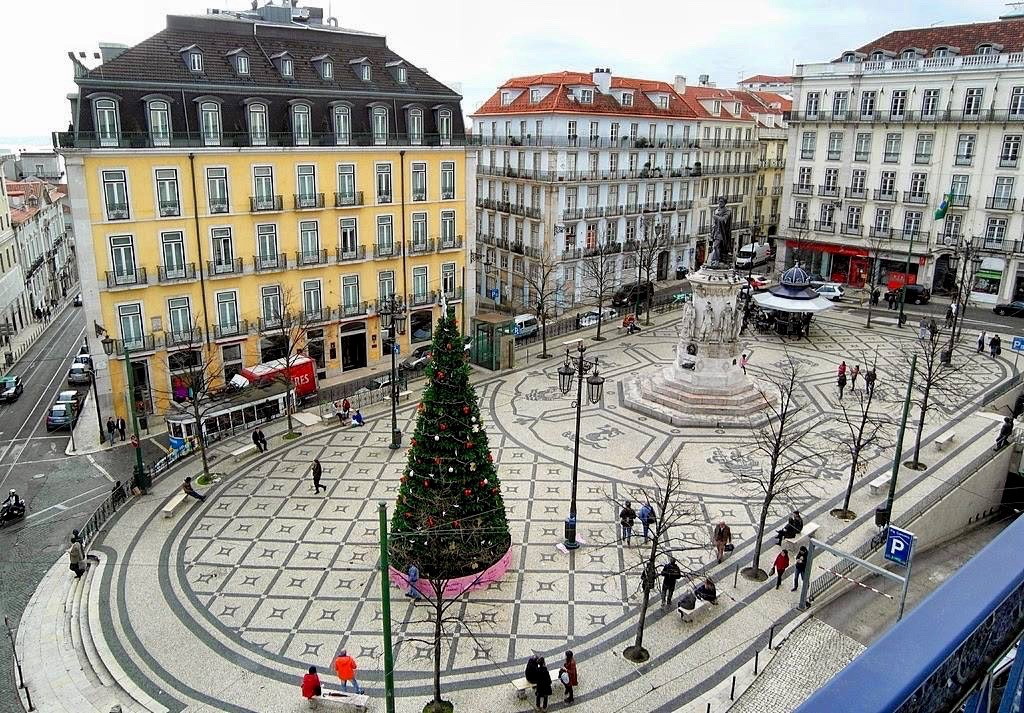
Praça de Camões, in Chiado

Lisbon is one of the most popular city destinations in Europe. The city of Lisbon and the Lisbon metropolitan area attracts a significant number of tourists each year, drawn to its historical and cultural heritage, efficient transportation connections, and well-developed tourist infrastructure.

== City layout and touristic neighbourhoods ==
The city is crossed by historical boulevards and monuments along the main thoroughfares, particularly in the upper districts; notable among these are the Avenida da Liberdade (Avenue of Liberty), Avenida Fontes Pereira de Melo, Avenida Almirante Reis and Avenida da República (Avenue of the Republic).

=== Pombaline Lower Town ===
Pombaline Lower Town (Baixa Pombalina de Lisboa).

The Pombaline Lower Town area covers about 23.6 ha (58 acres) of central Lisbon. It comprises the grid of streets north of the Praça do Comércio, roughly between the Cais do Sodré and the Alfama district beneath the Lisbon Castle, and extends northwards towards the Rossio and Figueira squares and the Avenida da Liberdade, a tree-lined boulevard noted for its tailoring shops and cafes.

The Pombaline Baixa is an elegant district, primarily constructed after the 1755 Lisbon earthquake. The current grid pattern strongly differs from the organic streetplan that characterised the district before the earthquake. The Pombaline Baixa was placed on Portugal's "tentative list" of potential World Heritage Sites in 2004.

=== Alfama ===
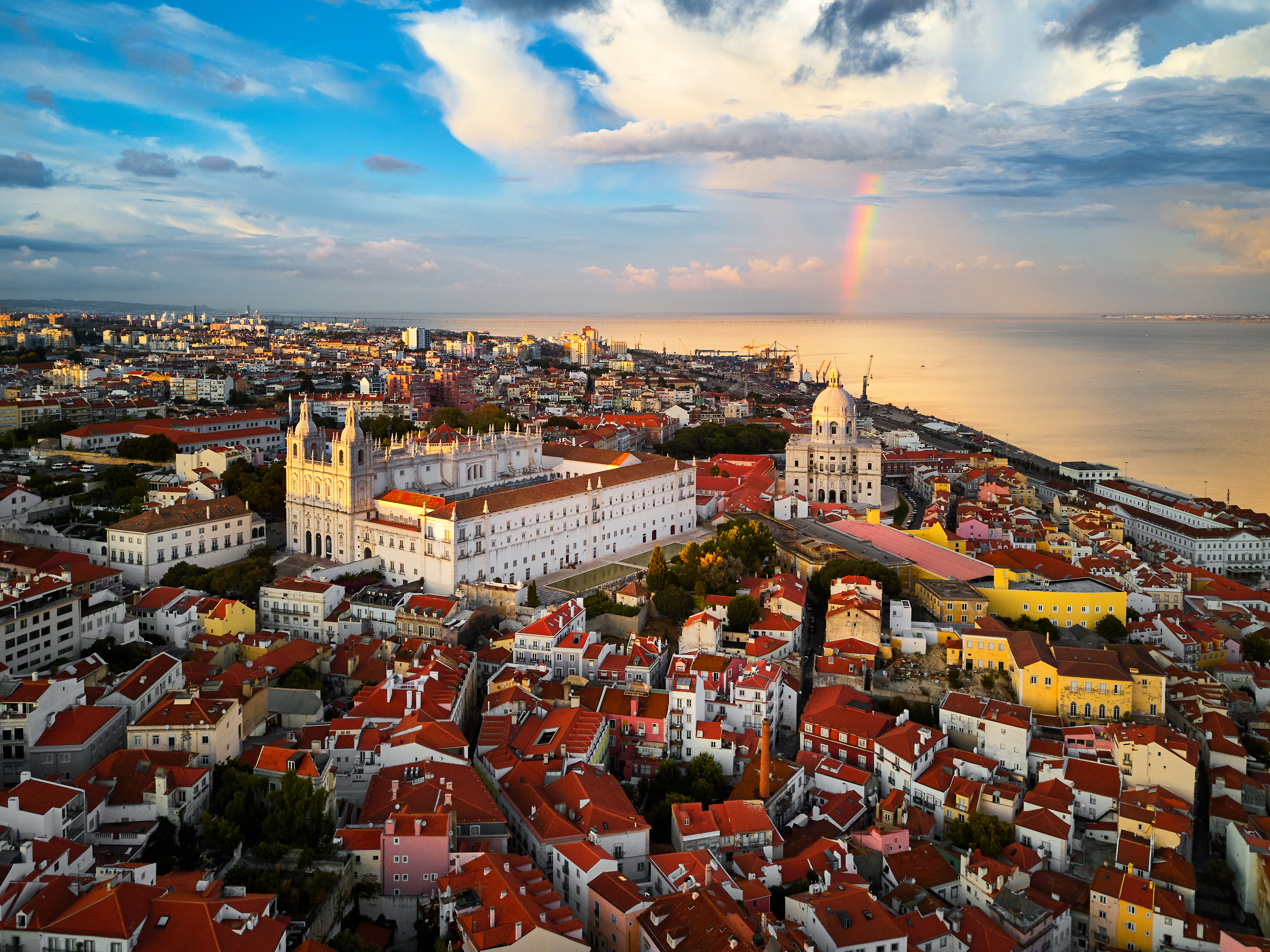
Aerial view of Alfama

The Alfama is the oldest district of Lisbon, spreading on the slope between the São Jorge Castle and the Tejo river. The district contains many important historical attractions, as well as an abundance of Fado bars and restaurants.

During the times of Moorish domination, Alfama constituted the whole of the city, which later spread to the West (Baixa neighbourhood). Alfama became inhabited by the fishermen and the poor, and its condition as the neighbourhood of the poor continues to this day. The great 1755 Lisbon earthquake did not destroy the Alfama, which has remained a picturesque labyrinth of narrow streets and small squares. Lately the neighbourhood has been invigorated with the renovation of the old houses and new restaurants where Fado—Portugal's traditional melancholic music—can be enjoyed.

Among the churches of the Alfama are Lisbon Cathedral (12th–14th centuries), the oldest of the city and located to the West of the neighbourhood, the Convent of the Grace (Convento da Graça, 18th century), near the Castle, the mannerist Monastery of São Vicente de Fora (late 16th–18th century), where the Kings of the House of Braganza are buried, and the baroque Church of Santa Engrácia (17th century), now converted into a National Pantheon for important Portuguese personalities.

Overlooking the Alfama is the mediaeval Castle of São Jorge, royal residence until the early 16th century and now offering the best views of the city. São Jorge Castle is a Moorish castle occupying a commanding hilltop overlooking the historic centre of Lisbon and Tagus River. The strongly fortified citadel dates from medieval period of Portuguese history, and is one of the main tourist sites of Lisbon. The castle's footprint is roughly square, and it was originally encircled by a wall, to form a citadel. The castle complex consists of the castle itself (the castelejo), some ancillary buildings (including the ruins of the royal palace), gardens, and a large terraced square from which an impressive panorama of Lisbon is visible. The main entrance to the citadel is a 19th-century gate surmounted by the coat-of-arms of Portugal, the name of Queen Maria II, and the date, 1846. This gate permits access to the main square (Praça d'Armas), which is decorated with old cannons and a bronze statue of Afonso Henriques, the Portuguese monarch who took the castle from the Moors. This statue is a copy of the 19th-century original, by the romantic sculptor António Soares dos Reis, which is located near Guimarães Castle in central Portugal.

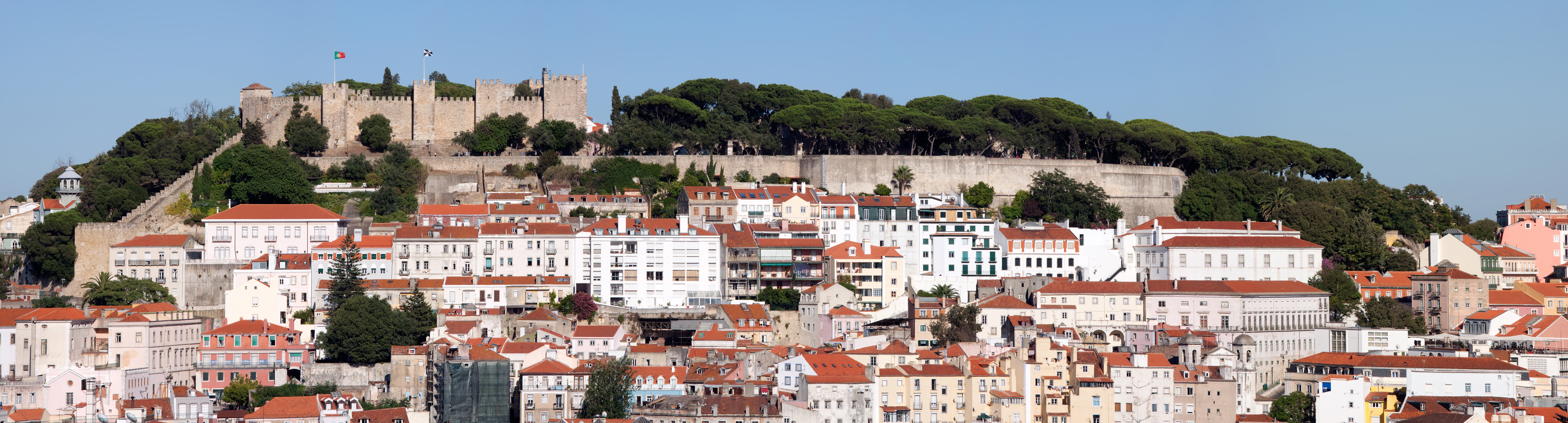
A panorama of the Saint George Castle in the Alfama neighborhood.

In the slopes of Alfama there are other terraces (miradouros) from which to see the city, like the Miradouro de Santa Luzia, near the church of the same name and over remnants of the Moorish city walls, and the Miradouro das Portas do Sol (Gates of the Sun). Near Miradouro of Santa Luzia is located the Museum of Decorative Arts (Museu de Artes Decorativas), a 17th-century mansion with magnificent interiors.

=== Bairro Alto ===
Bairro Alto is an area of central Lisbon that functions as a residential, shopping and entertainment district; it is the centre of the Portuguese capital's nightlife, attracting hipster youth and members of various music subcultures. Lisbon's Punk, Gay, Metal, Goth, Hip Hop and Reggae scenes all find a home in the Bairro with its many clubs and bars that cater to them. The crowds in the Bairro Alto are a multicultural mix of people representing a broad cross-section of modern Portuguese society, many of them being entertainment seekers and devotees of various music genres outside the mainstream, yet Fado, Portugal's national music, still survives in the midst of the new nightlife.

=== Avenida da Liberdade ===
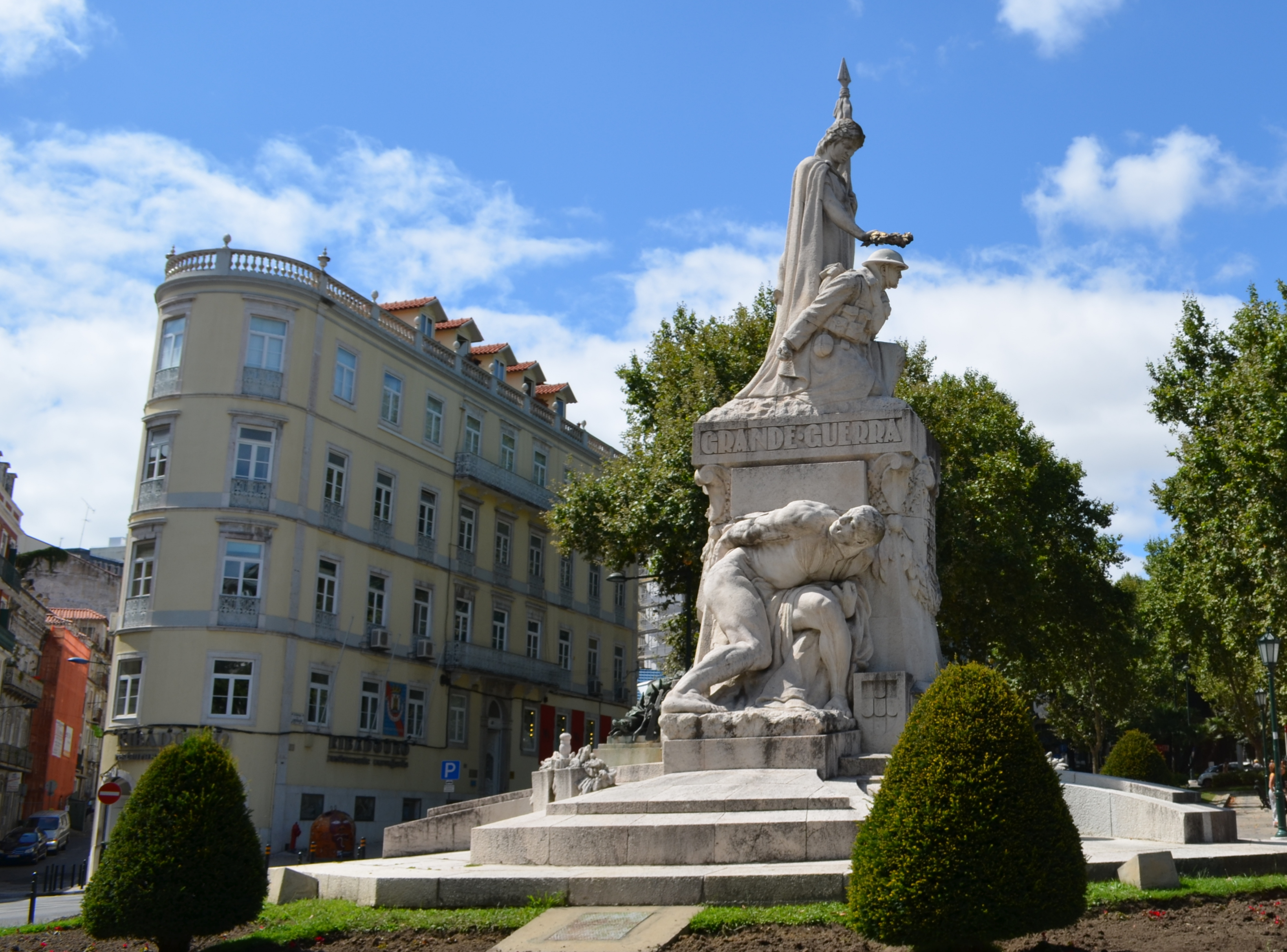
Monument to the fallen in World War I (1931) in the Avenida da Liberdade.

Avenida da Liberdade ("Liberty Avenue" in English) is an important avenue in central Lisbon that runs northwest from downtown Lisbon. It is a 90 metre-wide boulevard, 1100 m long, with ten lanes divided by pedestrian walkways adorned with gardens. It links Restauradores Square with Marquis of Pombal Square. Residents of Lisbon sometimes refer to it simply as the "Avenida" (the Avenue).

It boasts several interesting buildings that reflect Portuguese architecture from the late 19th through the early 21st centuries. Its pedestrian sidewalks and roundabouts, paved with the traditional Portuguese pavement, are decorated with many monuments and statues that pay homage to important personalities. The large monument to the fallen in World War I was inaugurated in 1931.

The buildings of the Avenue include modern office and hotel buildings. Its location in the central district of Lisbon, scenic qualities, hotels, shops, theatres and architecture turn it into an important tourist attraction of the city. Famous nationally for hosting numerous luxury brands such as Christian Dior, Versace, Gucci, Yves Saint Laurent, Prada, and Armani.

== Architecture and monuments ==
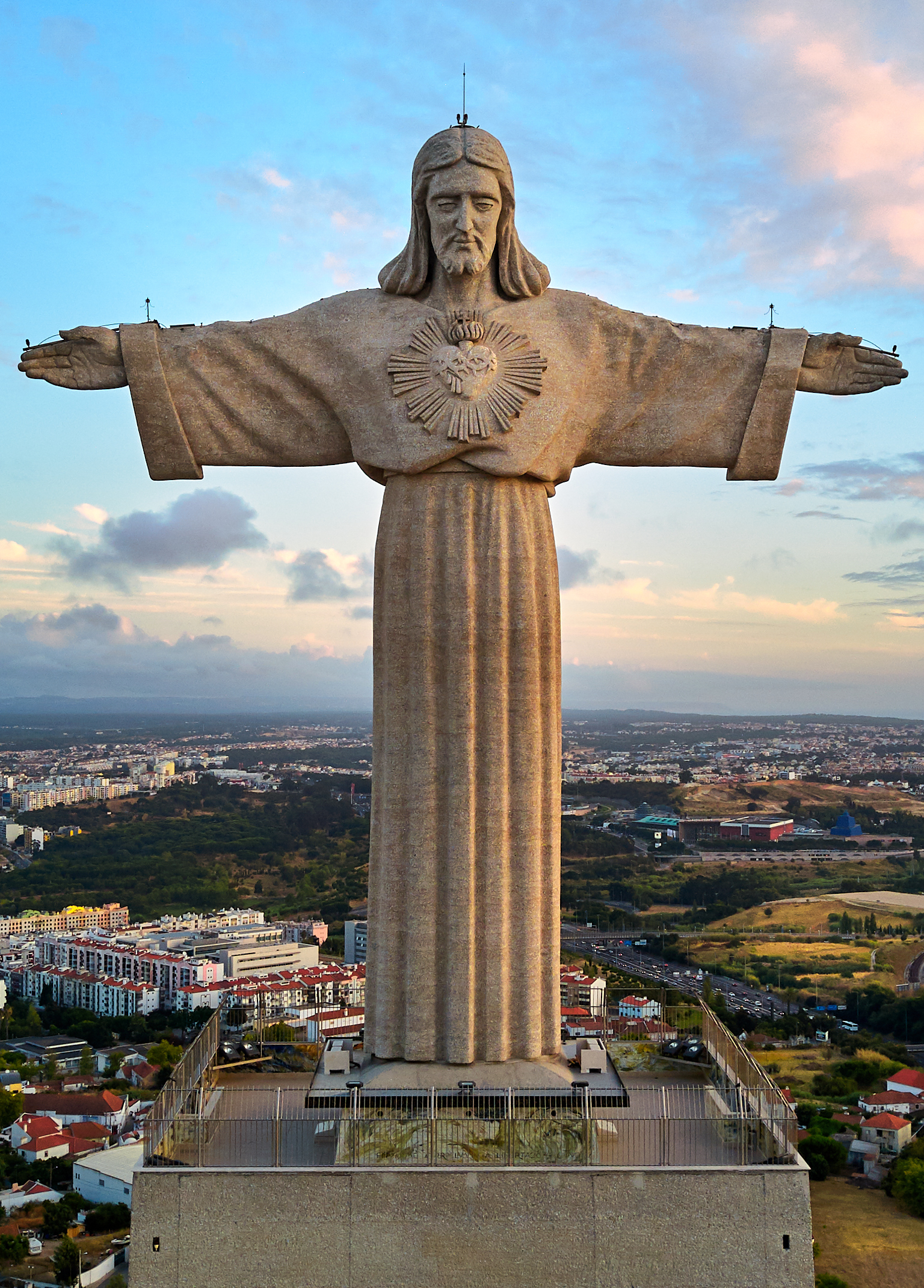
The Christ the King monument.

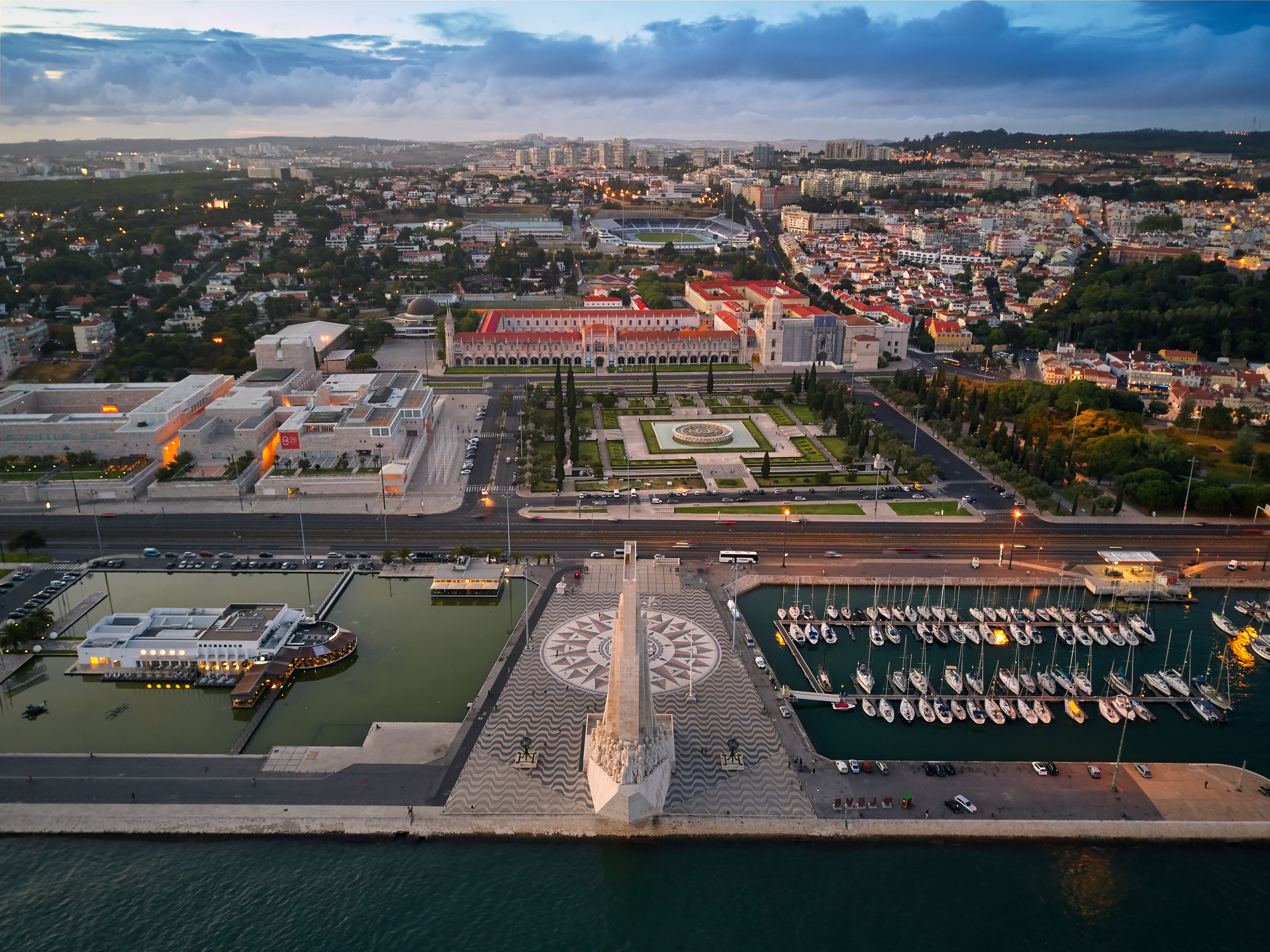
Jerónimos Monastery, in Belém.

Lisbon lacks the architecture and monuments of many other historic European capitals in large part due to the 1755 Lisbon earthquake, which destroyed most of Lisbon's buildings, including famous palaces and libraries, as well as most examples of Portugal's distinctive 16th-century Manueline architecture. Several buildings that had suffered little earthquake damage were destroyed by the subsequent fire.

The city of Lisbon is rich in architecture; Romanesque, Gothic, Manueline, Baroque, Modern and Postmodern constructions can be found all over Lisbon.

The monument and sanctuary to Christ the King (Cristo Rei) stands on the southern bank of the Tagus River, in Almada. With open arms, overlooking the whole city, it resembles the Corcovado monument in Rio de Janeiro, and was built after World War II, as a memorial of thanksgiving for Portugal's being spared the horrors and destruction of the war.

Notable features of Pombaline structures include the Pombaline cage, a symmetrical wood-lattice framework aimed at distributing earthquake force, and inter-terrace walls that are built higher than roof timbers to reduce fire contagion.

== Parks ==
Edward VII Park, the second largest park in the city following the Monsanto Forest Park, extends down the main avenue (Avenida da Liberdade), with many flowering plants and greenspaces, that includes the permanent collection of subtropical and tropical plants in the winter garden (Portuguese: Estufa Fria). Originally named Parque da Liberdade, it was renamed in honour of Edward VII of the United Kingdom who visited Lisbon in 1903.

== UNESCO sites ==
Lisbon has two sites listed by UNESCO as a World Heritage Site: Belém Tower and Jerónimos Monastery. Additionally, the Pombaline Baixa or Downtown of Lisbon is eligible to be nominated as a UNESCO site.

Name	Image	Location	Period	UNESCO data	Description	Ref
Monastery of the Hieronymites and Tower of Belém	White tower near the sea	Lisbon; 38°41′31″N 9°12′57″W	16th to 17th centuries	263; 1983, 2008 (extended); iii, iv; 2.66 ha (103 ha)	"Standing at the entrance to Lisbon harbour, the Monastery of the Hieronymites ... exemplifies Portuguese art at its best. The nearby Tower of Belém, built to commemorate Vasco da Gama's expedition, is a reminder of the great maritime discoveries that laid the foundations of the modern world."	
Pombaline Baixa or Downtown of Lisbon		Lisbon; 38°42′41″N 9°8′14″W	18th century	1980; 2004; (i), (ii), (iv), (v), (vi)	"As a result of the destruction of the greater part of the city, including the symbolic centres of power, by the 1755 earthquake ... a complex reconstruction scheme was imposed by the commanding figure of the Marqugs [sic] de Pombal .... it was decided to rebuild part of the city from scratch, on the basis of a strict legislative programme and a series of practical principles and methods inspired by Portuguese military engineering experience and urban experiments in the colonial territories."	

== Events ==
Church of Saint Anthony of Lisbon: the birthplace of the Portuguese saint became a place of great pilgrimages.

13 June is Lisbon´s holiday in honour of the city's saint, Anthony of Lisbon (Portuguese: Santo António). Saint Anthony, also known as Saint Anthony of Padua, was a wealthy Portuguese bohemian who was canonised and made Doctor of the Church after a life preaching to the poor. Although Lisbon's patron saint is Saint Vincent of Saragossa, whose remains are housed in the Sé Cathedral, there are no festivities associated with this saint.

In 1994, Lisbon was the European Capital of Culture and in 1998 organised the Expo '98 (1998 Lisbon World Exposition). Lisbon has been home to Rock in Rio Lisboa, one of the world's largest pop-rock festivals. Annual popular music events within the metropolitan area include the Optimus Alive! and Super Bock Super Rock festivals.

Lisbon is also home to the Lisbon Architecture Triennial, the Moda Lisboa (Fashion Lisbon), ExperimentaDesign – Biennial of Design and LuzBoa – Biennial of Light.

In addition, the mosaic Portuguese pavement (Calçada Portuguesa) was born in Lisbon, in the mid-1800s. The art has since spread to the rest of the Portuguese-speaking world. The city remains one of the most expansive examples of the technique, nearly all walkways and even many streets being created and maintained in this style.

In terms of Portuguese cities, Lisbon was considered the most livable in a survey of living conditions published yearly by Expresso.

Lisbon is home every year to the Lisbon Gay & Lesbian Film Festival, the Lisboarte, the DocLisboa – Lisbon International Documentary Film Festival, the Arte Lisboa – Contemporary Art Fair, the Festival of the Oceans, the International Organ Festival of Lisbon, the MOTELx – Lisbon International Horror Film Festival, the Lisbon Village Festival, the Festival Internacional de Máscaras e Comediantes, the Lisboa Mágica – Street Magic World Festival, the Monstra – Animated Film Festival, the Lisbon Book Fair, the Peixe em Lisboa – Lisbon Fish and Flavours, the Lisbon International Handicraft Exhibition, the Lisbon Photo Marathon, the IndieLisboa – International Independent Film Festival, the Alkantara Festival, the Temps d´Images Festival and the Jazz in August festival.

== Museums and theatres ==
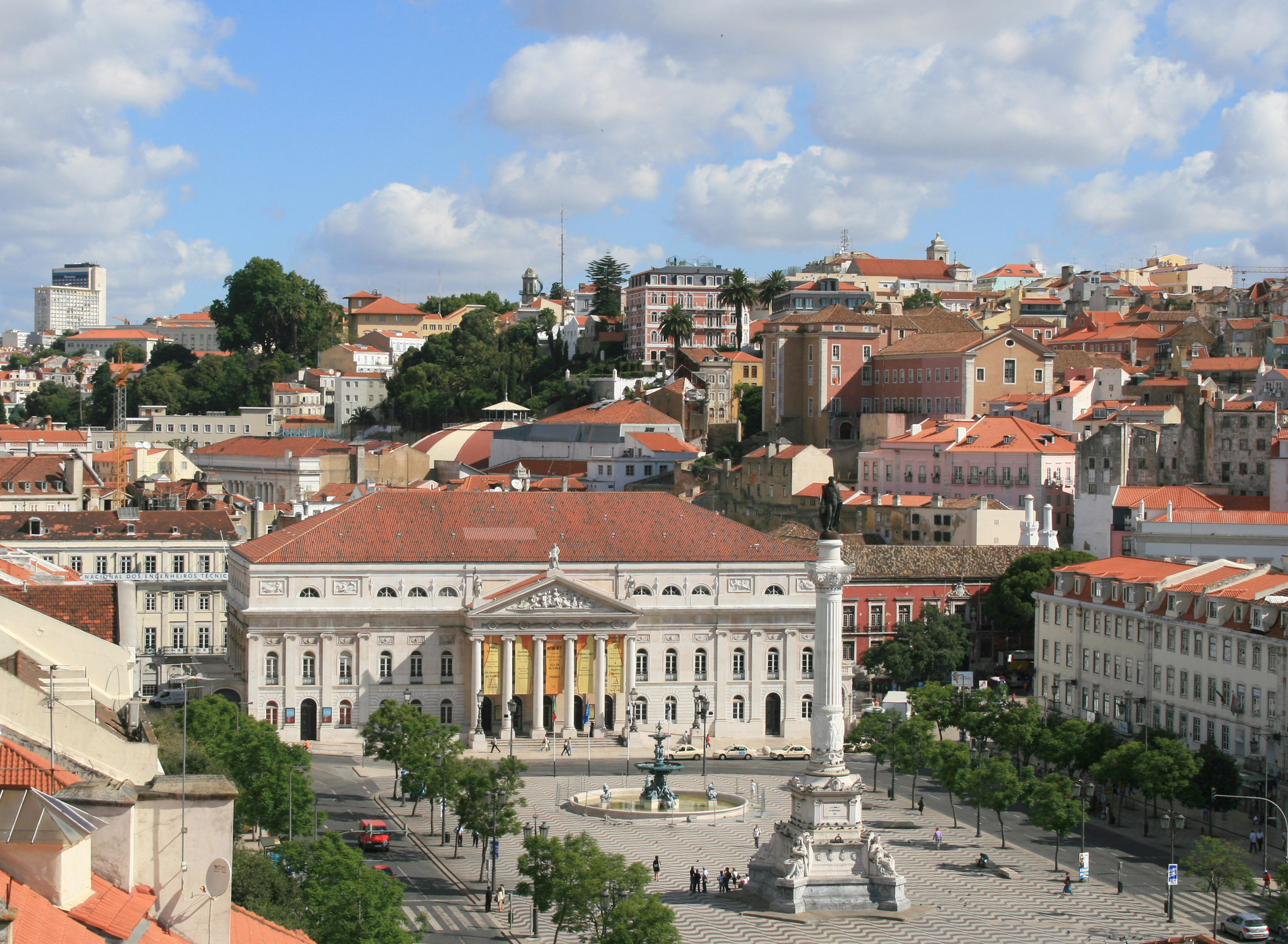
D. Maria II National Theatre, located in the Rossio Square.

There are several substantial museums in the city. The most famous ones are the Museu Nacional de Arte Antiga (National Museum of Ancient Art), the National Azulejo Museum, the Museu Calouste Gulbenkian (Calouste Gulbenkian Museum), containing varied collections of ancient and modern art, the Museu Nacional do Traje e da Moda (National Museum of Costume and Fashion), the Berardo Collection Museum (Modern Art) at the Cultural Centre of Belém, the Museu da Electricidade (Electricity Museum), the Museu Nacional dos Coches (National Coach Museum, containing the largest collection of royal coaches in the world), the Museum of Pharmacy, the National Museum of Natural History and Science, Museum of the Orient, the Museu do Teatro Romano (The Roman Theatre Museum), and the Lisbon City Museum.

Lisbon's Opera House, the Teatro Nacional de São Carlos, hosts a relatively active cultural agenda, mainly in autumn and winter. Other important theatres and musical houses are the Centro Cultural de Belém, the Teatro Nacional D. Maria II, the Gulbenkian Foundation, and the Teatro Camões.

=== List of museums ===
- Ajuda National Palace
- Archaeological Museum of São Miguel de Odrinhas
- Astronomical Observatory of Lisbon
- Beau-Séjour Palace
- Berardo Collection Museum
- Museu Calouste Gulbenkian
- Carmo Convent (Lisbon)
- Centro de Apoio Social de Runa
- Chiado Museum
- Electricity Museum (Lisbon)
- Ephemeral Museum
- Museu das Comunicações
- Museum of Lisbon
- Museu da Lourinhã
- Museum of the Orient
- Macau Science and Culture Centre
- Palace of the Marquesses of Fronteira
- National Museum of Ancient Art
- National Archaeology Museum (Lisbon)
- National Azulejo Museum
- National Coach Museum
- National Museum of Costume and Fashion
- National Museum of Ethnology (Portugal)
- National Museum of Natural History and Science, Lisbon
- Navy Museum
- Pharmacy Museum
- Pimenta Palace
- Rafael Bordalo Pinheiro Museum
- Sintra Natural History Museum

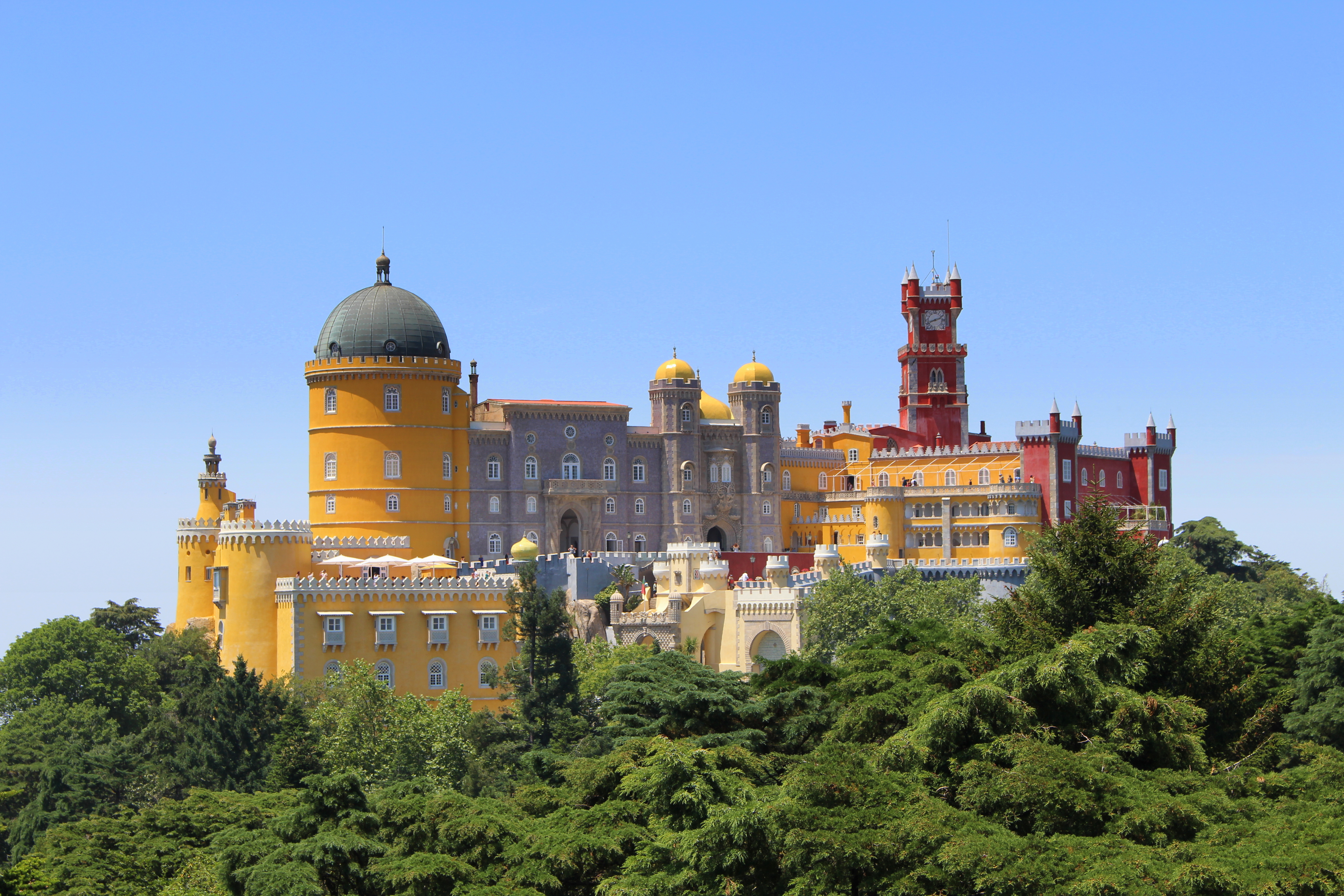
The Pena Palace in Sintra is a UNESCO World Heritage Site.

== Portuguese Riviera ==
There are a number of tourist attractions outside of the city proper but within the Lisbon metropolitan area. Examples include the Portuguese Riviera, including Estoril, the beach resorts of Cascais, and the old city and castle of Sintra.

== See also ==
- Tourism in Portugal
- Portuguese cuisine
