= Tourism in Portugal =

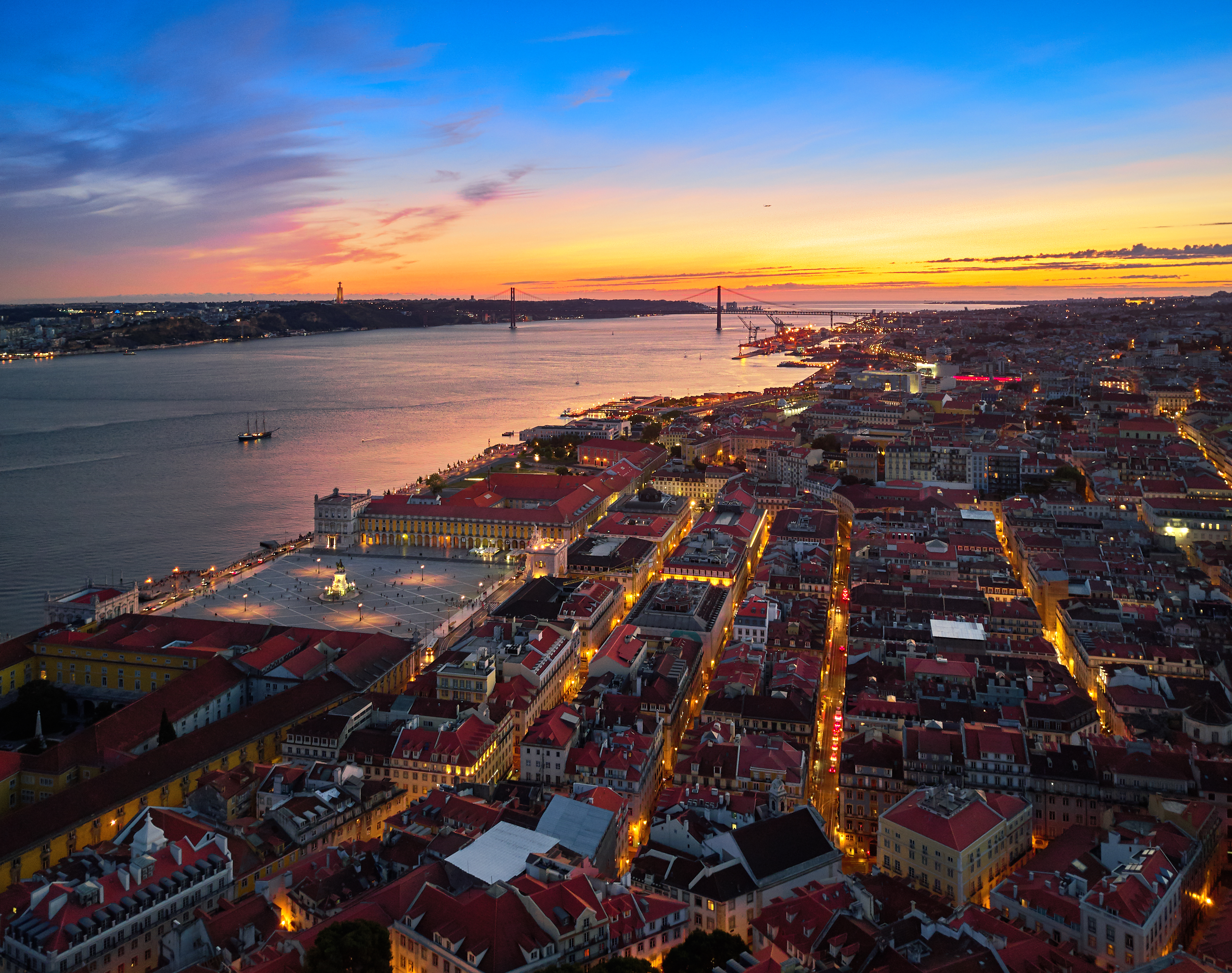
Lisbon, Portugal's capital.

Tourism in Portugal serves millions of international and domestic tourists. Tourists visit to see cities, historic landmarks, enjoy beaches, or religious sites. As of 2024, Portugal had 29 million international visitors. In addition, there were 22,9 million trips made by Portuguese residents including overnight stays at local hotels. The most popular destinations are Lisbon, Porto, the Algarve, the Portuguese Riviera, Madeira, Sintra, Óbidos, Nazaré, Fátima, Braga, Guimarães and Coimbra. The most popular with internationals were Lisbon region, the Algarve, the West and Tagus Valley region (Óbidos, Nazaré, Fátima), Northern Portugal (Porto, Braga and Guimarães) and Coimbra. National tourists prefer the Algarve and Northern Portugal, followed by Central region of Portugal.

== Statistics ==
Yearly tourist arrivals in millions

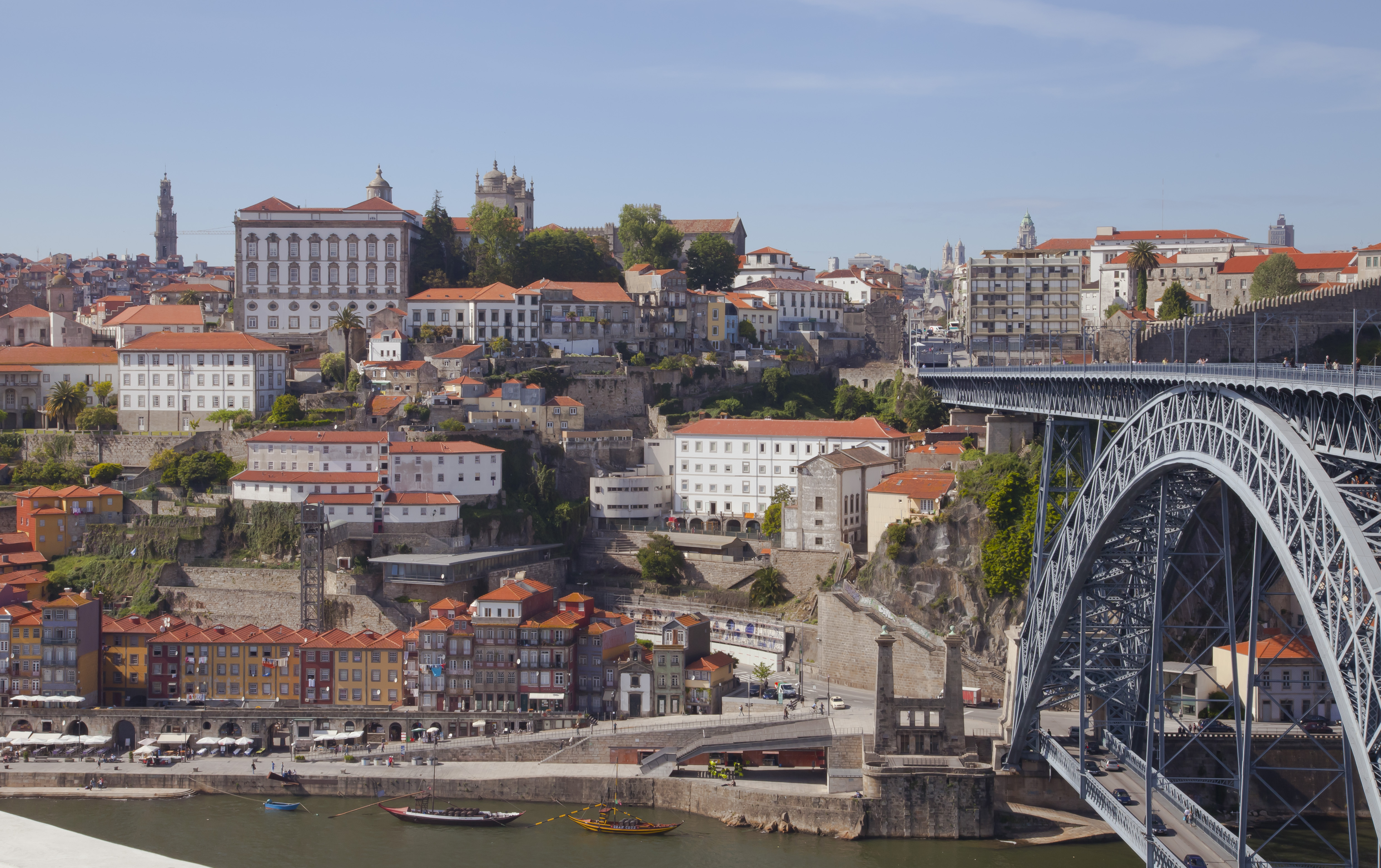
Porto, Portugal's fourth largest municipality

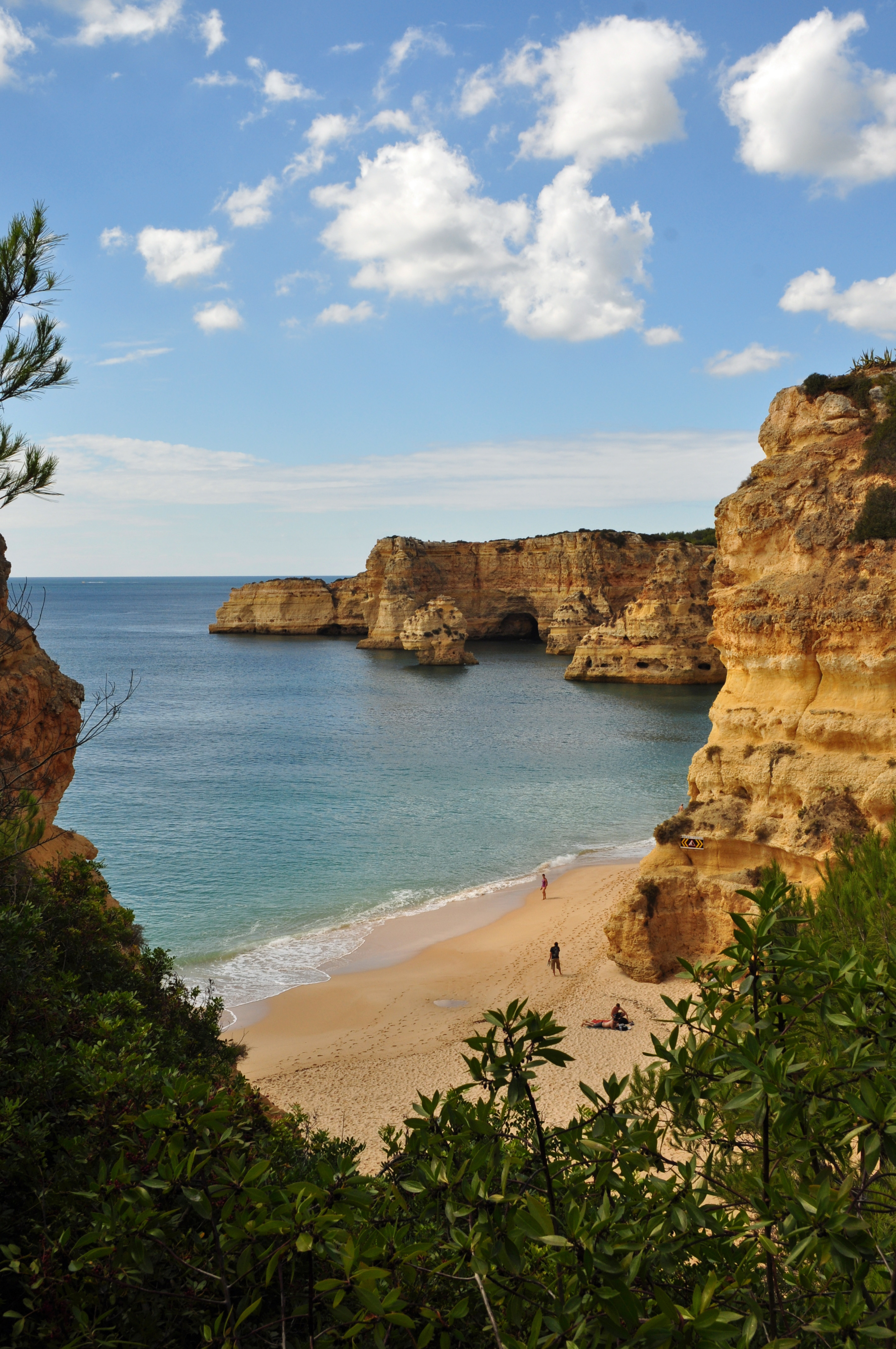
The Marinha Beach in Lagoa is considered by the Michelin Guide as one of the 10 most beautiful beaches in Europe and as one of the 100 most beautiful beaches in the world. The Algarve region leads in overnight stays.

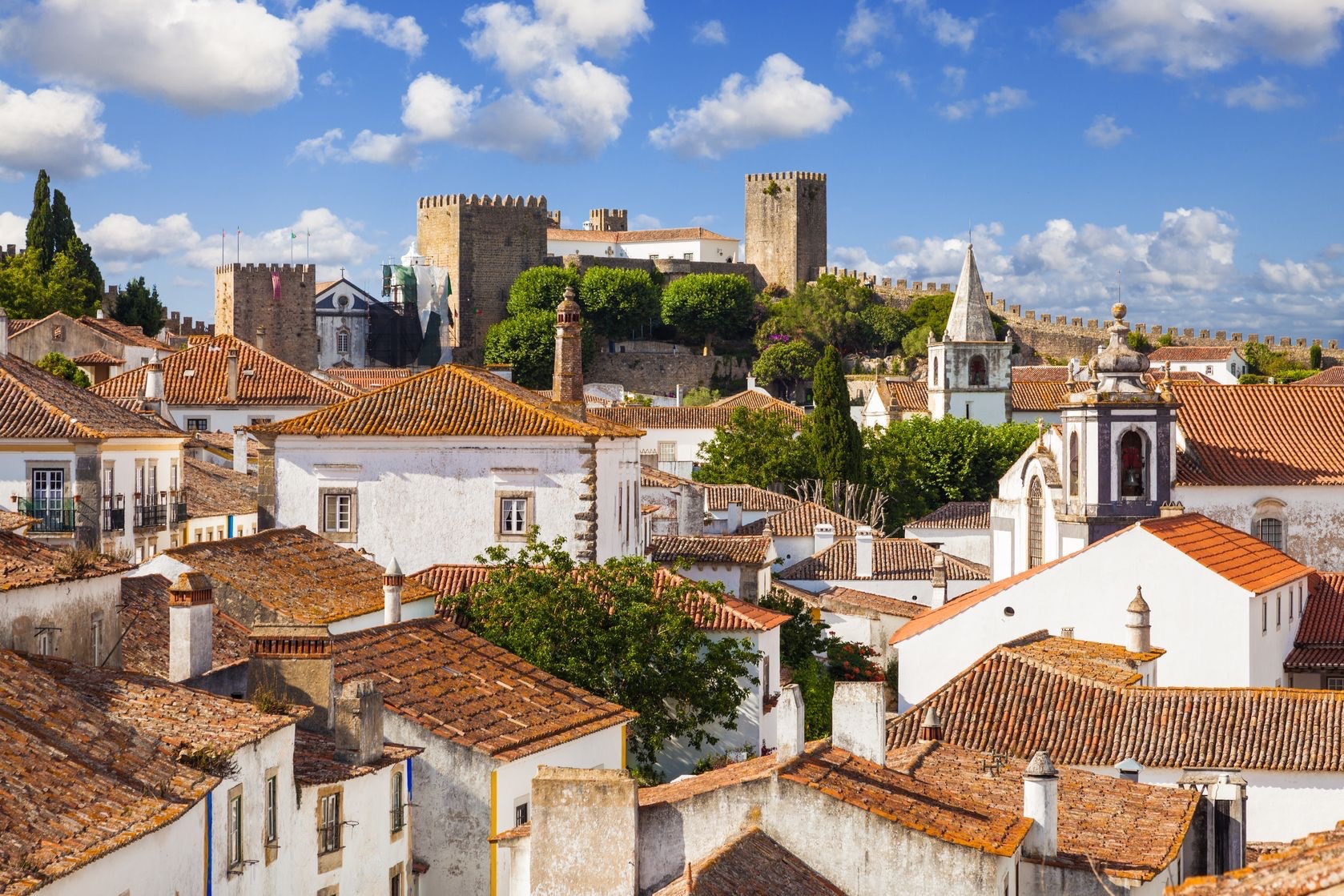
A view of Óbidos.

Panoramic view of Nazaré and its beach

Shrine of Our Lady of Fátima

University of Coimbra, one of the oldest universities in the world.

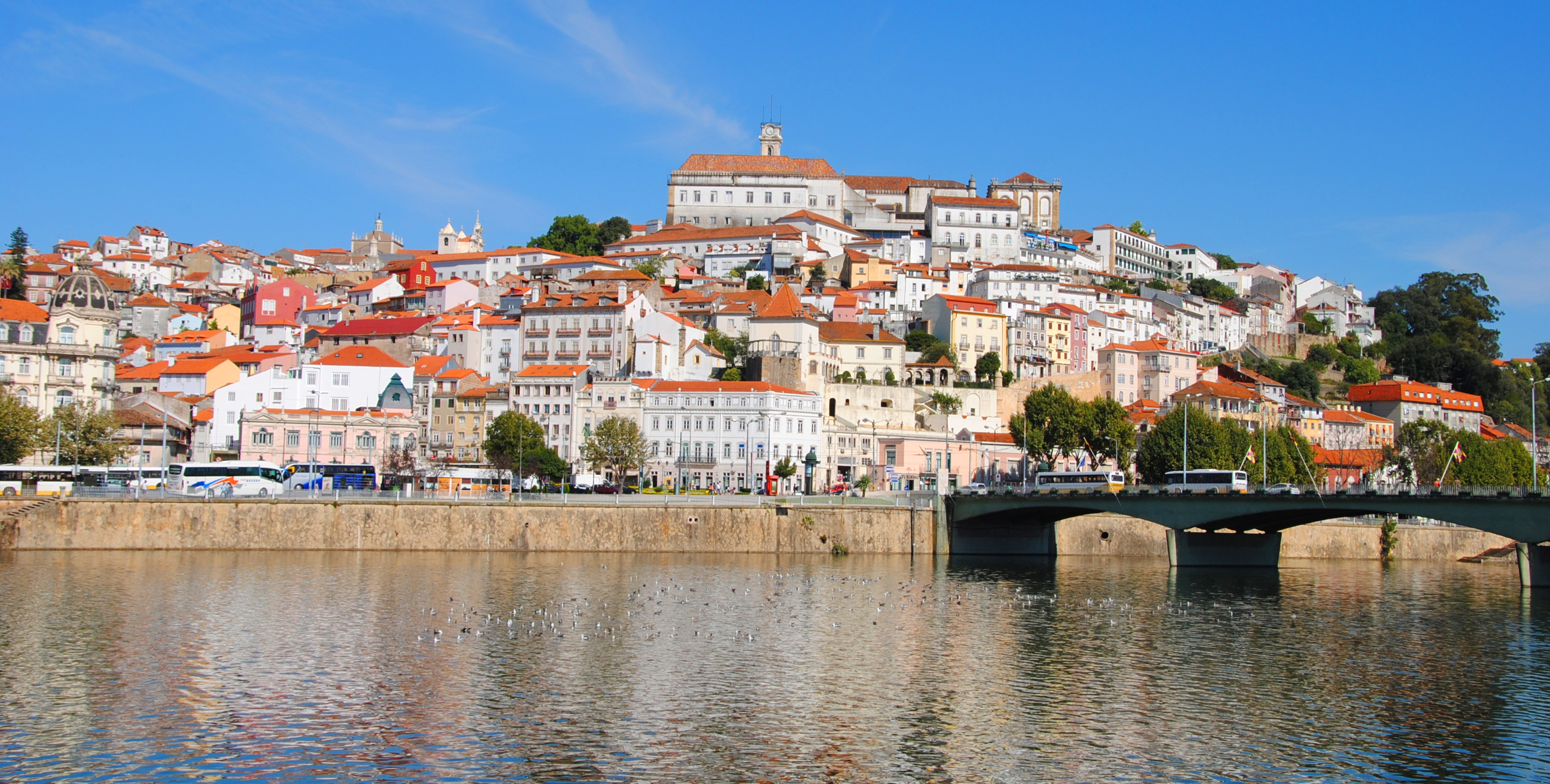
Mondego River in Coimbra.

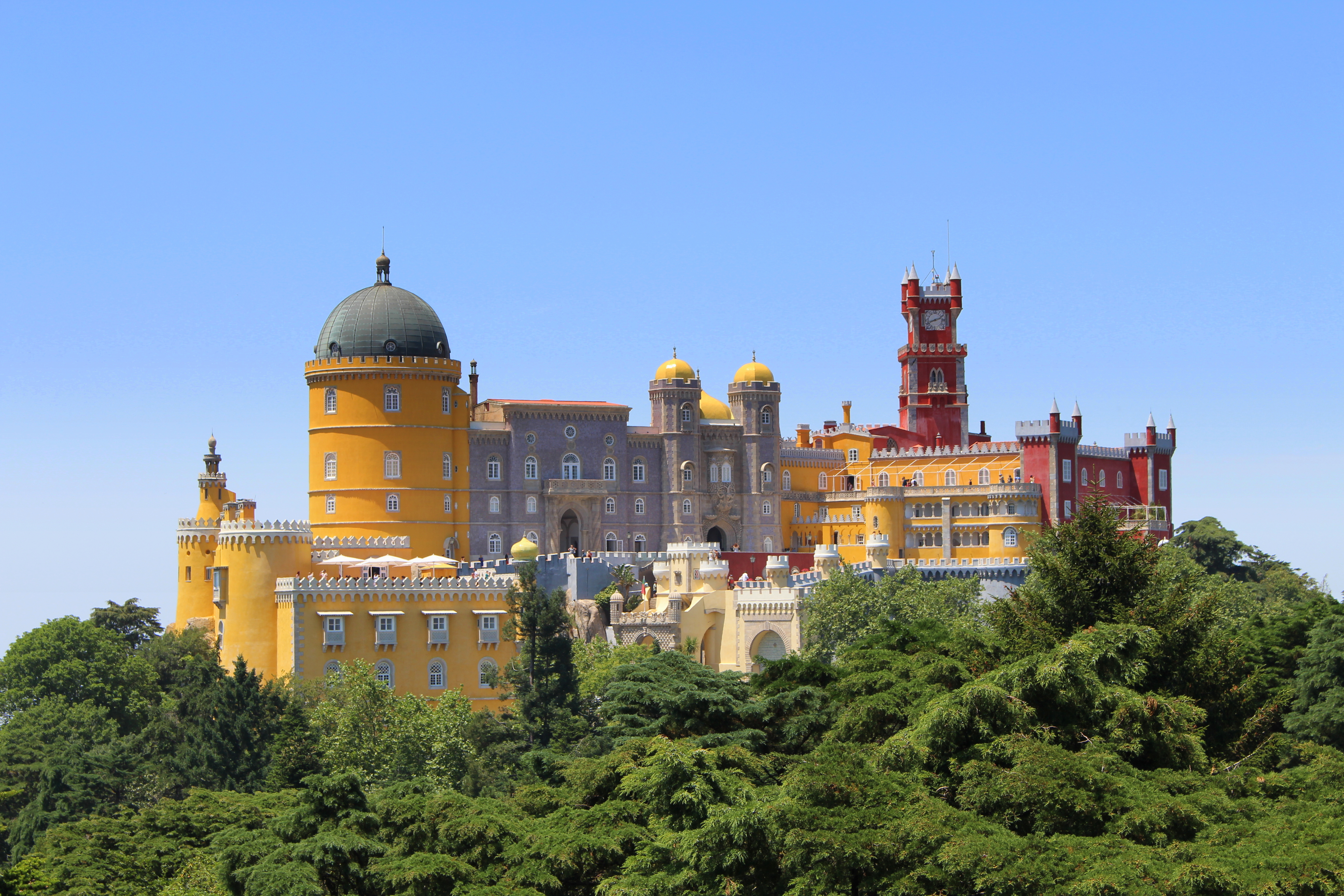
Pena National Palace in Sintra, an UNESCO World Heritage Site.

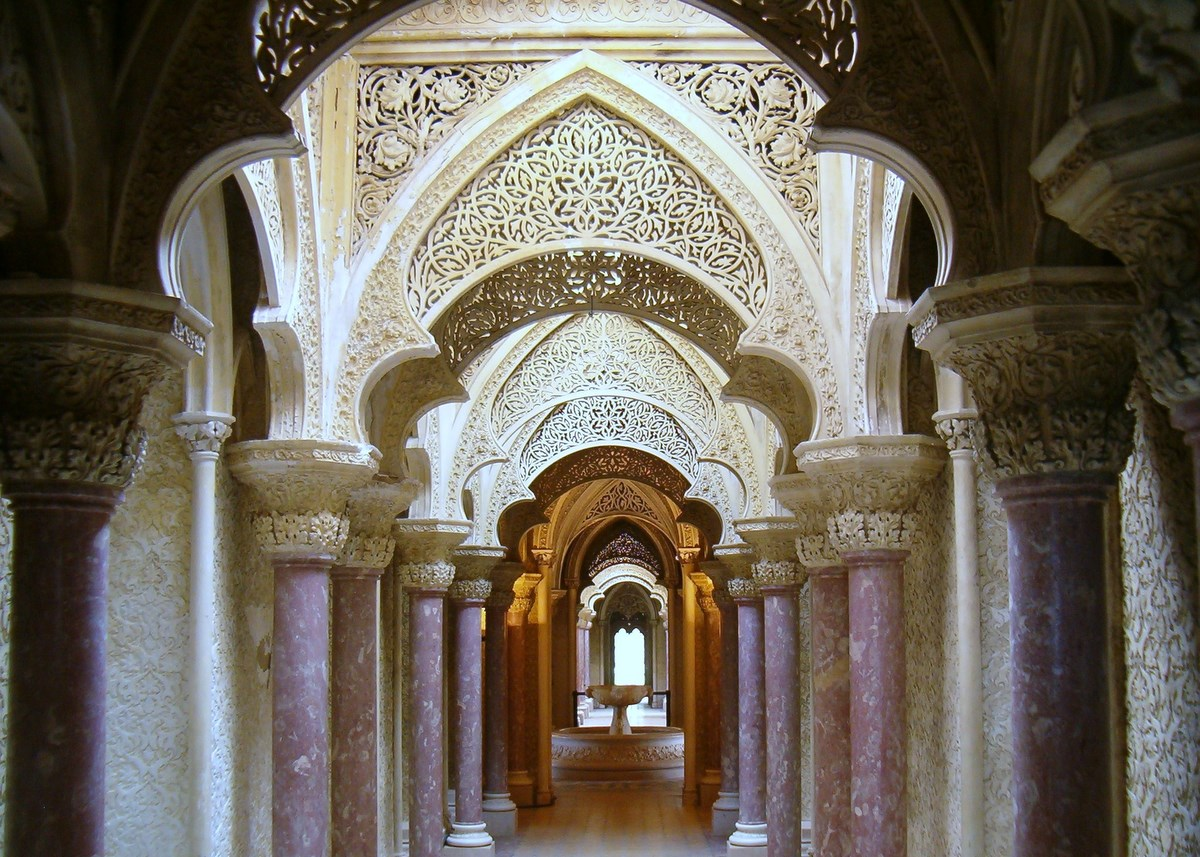
Monserrate Palace in Sintra

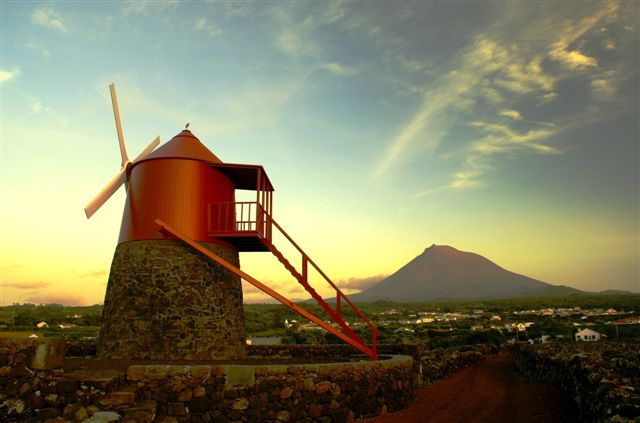
Pico, Azores, besides being the highest mountain in Portugal, it is a wine region whose landscape is protected as world heritage.

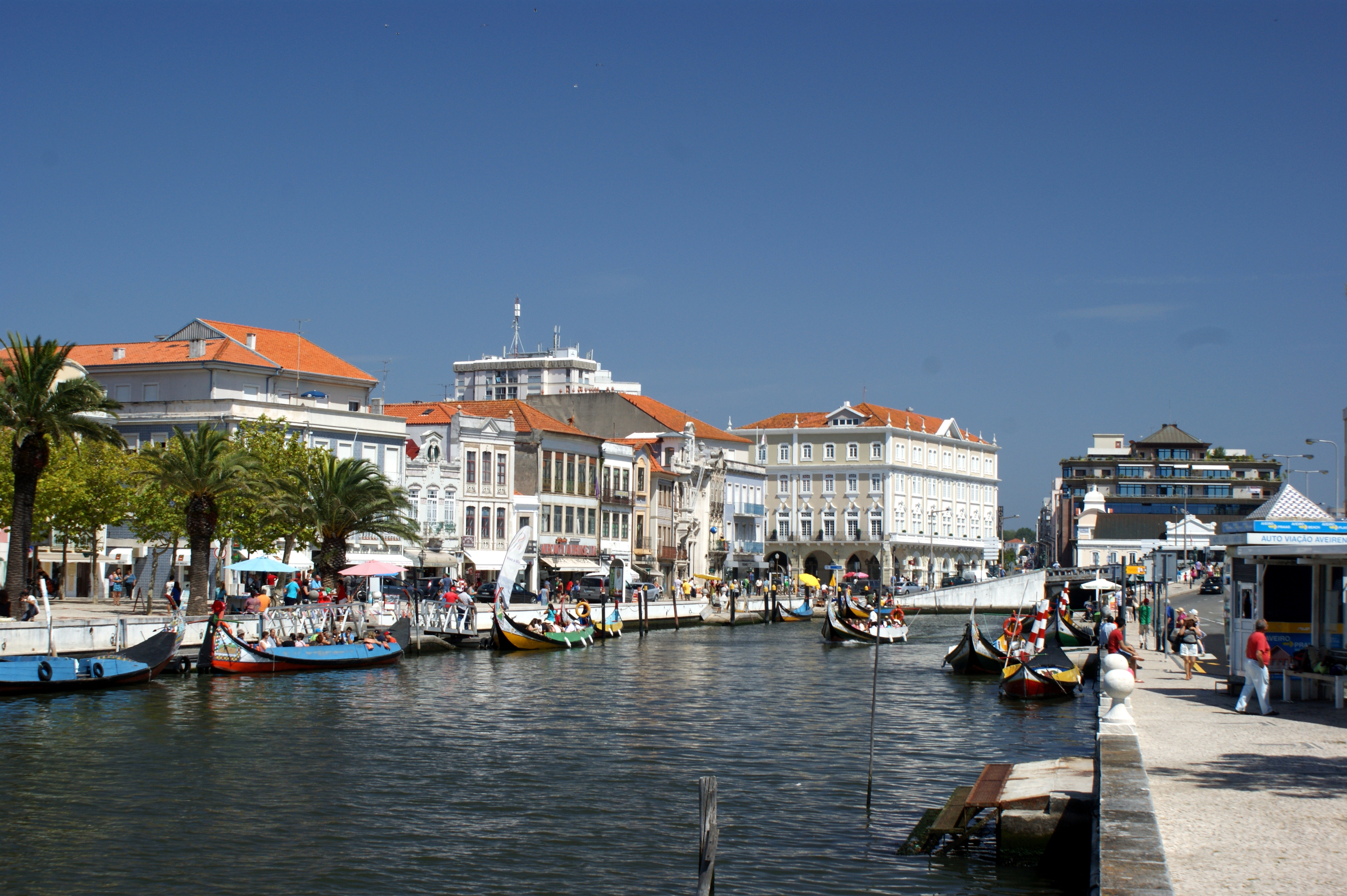
Aveiro is known as the "Portuguese Venice".

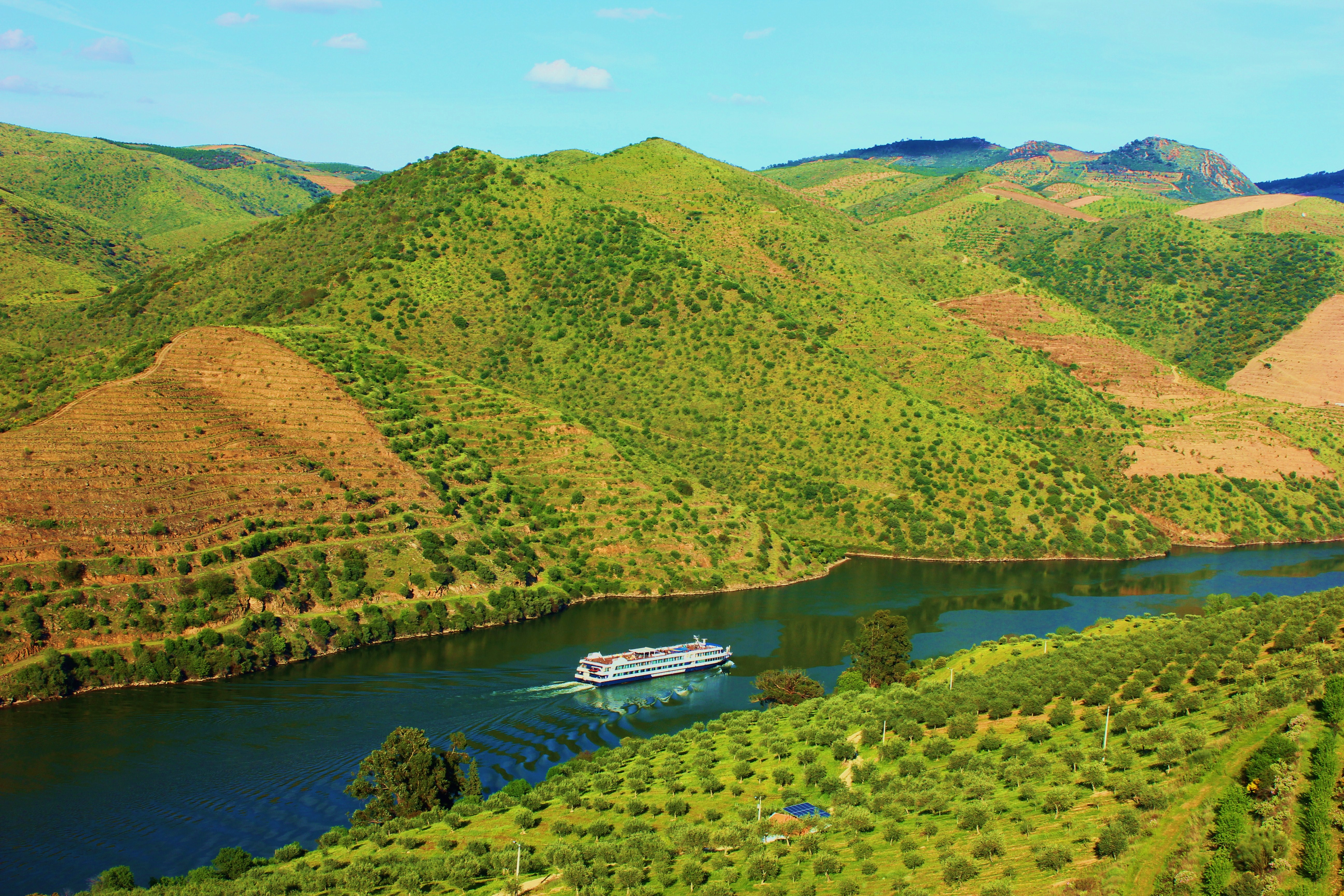
The Douro river in Northern Portugal.

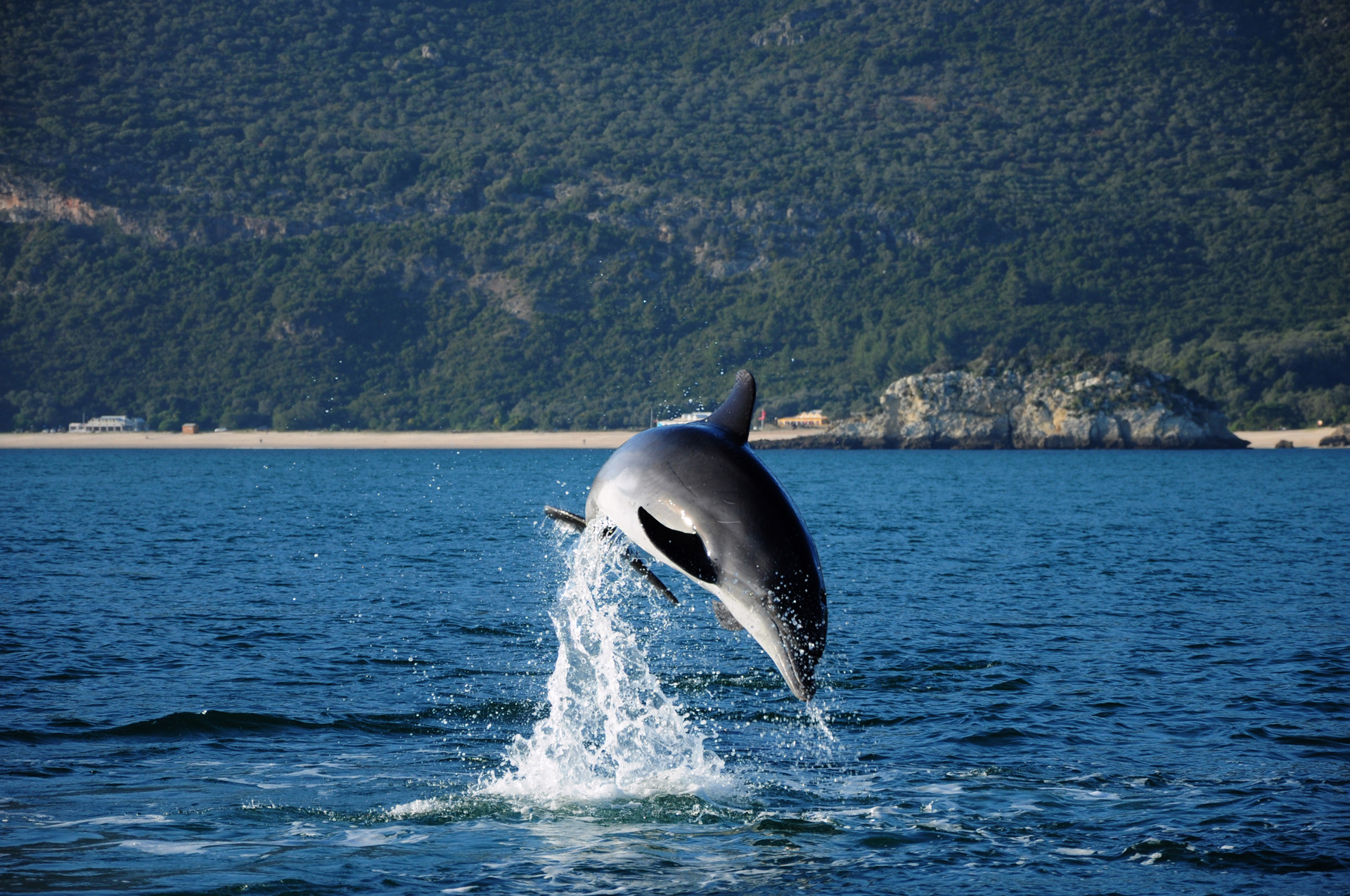
Dolphins in Arrábida natural reserve

In 2016, and compared to 2015, most tourists staying in hotels were attracted to Lisbon (6.3 million, up from 5.8), Porto and Northern Portugal (4.4 million, up from 3.9), the Algarve (4.2 million, up from 3.8), Central Portugal (3.2 million, up from 2.9 million), Madeira (1.5 million, up from 1.3), Alentejo (1.2 million, up from 1.1), and the Azores (0.5 million, up from 0.4). The Algarve and Lisbon lead in overnight stays. In 2016, overnight stays grew significantly in other regions: the Azores (+21.1%), Northern Portugal (+14.4%), Alentejo (+12%), Central Portugal (+11.8%), and Madeira (+10.9%).

The following table presents the nationality of the largest demographic of tourists from 2017 to 2023:

Rank	Country	2017	2018	2019	2020	2021	2022	2023
1	Spain	1,970,850	2,069,645	2,285,829	795,290	1,151,629	2,174,419	2,375,573
2	France	1,600,199	1,641,912	1,623,207	470,695	773,253	1,573,263	2,359,880
3	United Kingdom	2,099,008	2,042,867	2,145,902	456,639	693,307	2,114,418	2,358,637
4	United States	790,141	981,822	1,202,247	133,056	345,521	1,510,351	2,049,880
5	Germany	1,565,904	1,602,066	1,541,398	438,321	569,517	1,430,077	1,623,132
6	Brazil	971,453	1,103,718	1,281,675	272,884	235,292	925,718	1,101,323
7	Italy	650,325	665,930	722,115	162,028	257,072	672,728	823,971
8	Netherlands	617,124	610,161	598,375	179,947	311,255	642,057	649,232
9	Canada	-	346,428	380,896	56,634	50,585	384,183	595,305
10	Ireland	345,724	357,542	413,733	51,904	135,068	457,453	524,459
11	Switzerland	-	303,013	304,867	81,739	162,852	318,756	370,745
12	Belgium	312,029	327,264	325,799	95,136	187,716	333,049	344,196
13	Poland	-	285,362	277,616	62,124	154,606	275,624	330,946
14	Australia	-	142,393	151,970	12,302	11,310	87,287	196,112
15	Israel	-	119,799	138,493	12,446	40,603	162,456	188,338
16	China	-	324,258	385,307	56,623	17,249	68,117	187,484
17	Austria	-	141,439	151,055	20,945	59,624	143,485	173,204
18	South Korea	-	170,242	205,551	44,931	7,005	58,935	166,783
19	Denmark	-	142,573	144,490	30,691	71,943	157,755	163,006
20	Sweden	-	190,183	183,717	45,201	63,203	148,688	158,543
21	Czech Republic	-	68,383	63,591	18,654	48,231	97,040	120,392
22	Romania	-	73,377	73,743	22,754	43,121	86,588	99,400
23	Finland	-	101,215	105,560	21,542	30,086	95,860	92,458
24	Norway	-	97,900	94,405	12,984	19,503	86,568	91,441
25	Ukraine	-	44,188	57,526	14,796	37,382	75,733	90,639
26	India	-	52,962	72,477	15,341	15,544	60,964	86,899
27	Mexico	-	41,717	47,548	7,109	12,696	55,121	82,175
28	Argentina	-	67,905	72,674	10,375	7,857	58,371	76,803
29	Hungary	-	52,442	52,438	12,378	24,635	54,190	73,483
30	Russia	-	170,330	186,981	38,926	28,590	60,053	72,684
	Other foreign	3,666,674	969,121	1,118,929	250,550	351,618	953,603	1,281,345
Total international visitors		14,589,431	15,308,157	16,410,114	3,904,945	5,917,873	15,322,910	18,238,375

In 2016, accounting international tourists, the most popular regions were Lisbon (4.4 million), Algarve (3 million), Northern Portugal (2.1 million), Central Portugal (1.2), Madeira (1.2), Alentejo 370,000 and the Azores. For national tourists the most popular regions were Northern Portugal (2.3), Central Portugal (2.0), Lisbon (1.9), the Algarve (1.2), Alentejo (0.8), Madeira (0.29), and the Azores (0.27).

Lisbon is, with Barcelona, one of the European cities leading in overnight stays. The urban areas of Porto and Northern Portugal, north of Douro River surpassed Madeira, in 2010, and the Algarve, in 2015, and became the second most visited destination in Portugal. In 2015, most tourists were Europeans, but also from the Americas and Asia. Sleeping in the country's hotels, the most numerous are the British, Spanish, French, Germans, Brazilians, the Dutch, Americans, Italians, and the Japanese, which not only want the sun and the beach, but mostly cultural ones, city breaks, gastronomy, nautical tourism, or business traveling.

Portugal won 14 "Oscars" of the tourism. The national tourism had 77 nominations and won a total of 14 awards in more than 10 European categories, surpassing Spain or Italy, at the gala of the World Travel Awards 2015, whose ceremony took place in Sardinia, Italy. CNN compared Lisbon and Porto head-to-head in order to find who has the best food, culture, old cafés and boutiques, nightlife, and the best beaches.

Travel guide giants Lonely Planet have designated Portugal as one of the top 3 countries to visit in 2018.

== Tourism regions ==
Tourist hotspots in Portugal are Lisbon, Porto, the Algarve, Madeira, Sintra, Óbidos, Fátima, Coimbra and Azores, but the Portuguese government is currently developing new destinations: the Douro Valley, Porto Santo Island, and Alentejo.

=== Tourist regions ===
The main tourist regions can be broken-down into:

- the Greater Lisbon,
- the Greater Porto,
- the Algarve,
- the Alentejo,
- Central Portugal,
- Northern Portugal and
- the Portuguese Islands: Madeira and Azores.

Other tourist regions include Douro Sul, Templários, Dão-Lafões, Costa do Sol, Costa Azul, Planície Dourada, that are unknown to many tourists or visitors.

Most of these regions are grouped in tourism reference areas, which continue to be in a state of reorganization and evolution, some based on the traditional regions of Portugal: the Costa Verde (Green Coast); Costa da Prata (Silver Coast); Costa de Lisboa (Lisbon Coast); Montanhas (Mountains); Planícies (Plains); Algarve; and the islands of the archipelagos of Madeira and the Azores. All these regions are grouped in tourism reference areas, which are widely known because these are the traditional regions:

- Costa Verde in Norte Region — The Portuguese green coast comprises all the northern coast of Portugal from the estuary of the Minho River to the city of Porto.
- Costa de Prata in Centro Region — The Portuguese silver coast comprises from Porto to Lisbon. Fátima, Nazaré and Óbidos are 3 very important places.
- Portuguese Riviera (Sintra, Cascais and Estoril)
- Comporta — The northwestern coast of the Alentejo
- Caparica Coast — The coast south of Lisbon, across the Tagus river
- Montanhas — Mountainous and interior regions of northern and central Portugal, namely Serra da Estrela and Trás-os-Montes.
- Planícies — The Portuguese plane region of Alentejo in the south.
- Algarve — The southern coast of Portugal including the Golden Triangle.
- Madeira — The Madeira islands.
- Açores — The Azores islands.

== Protected areas ==
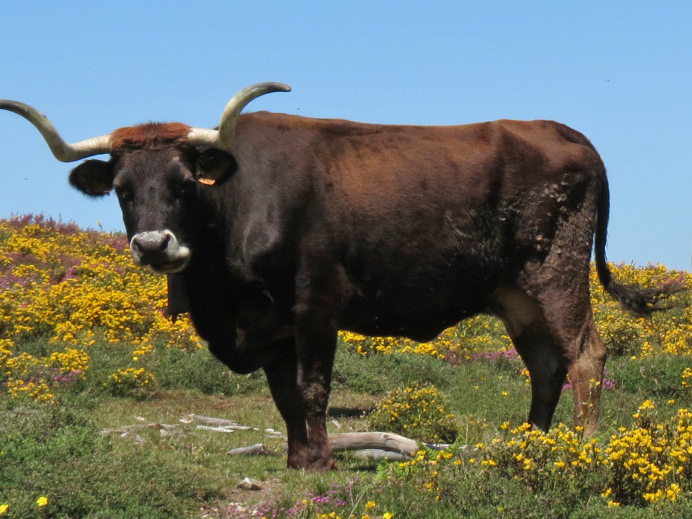
Maronesa in Alvão Natural Park

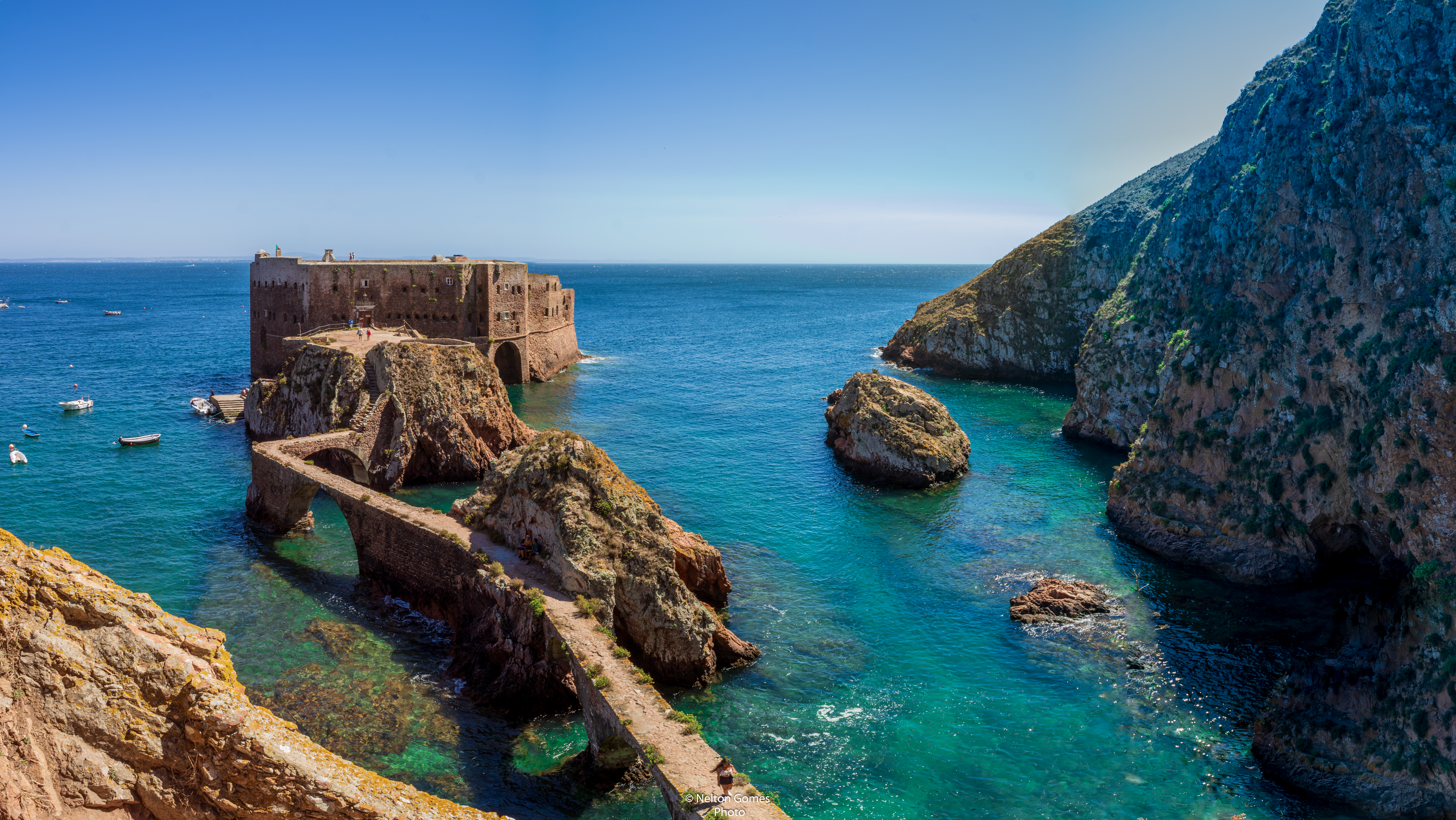
St. John the Baptist Fort in Berlengas Islands

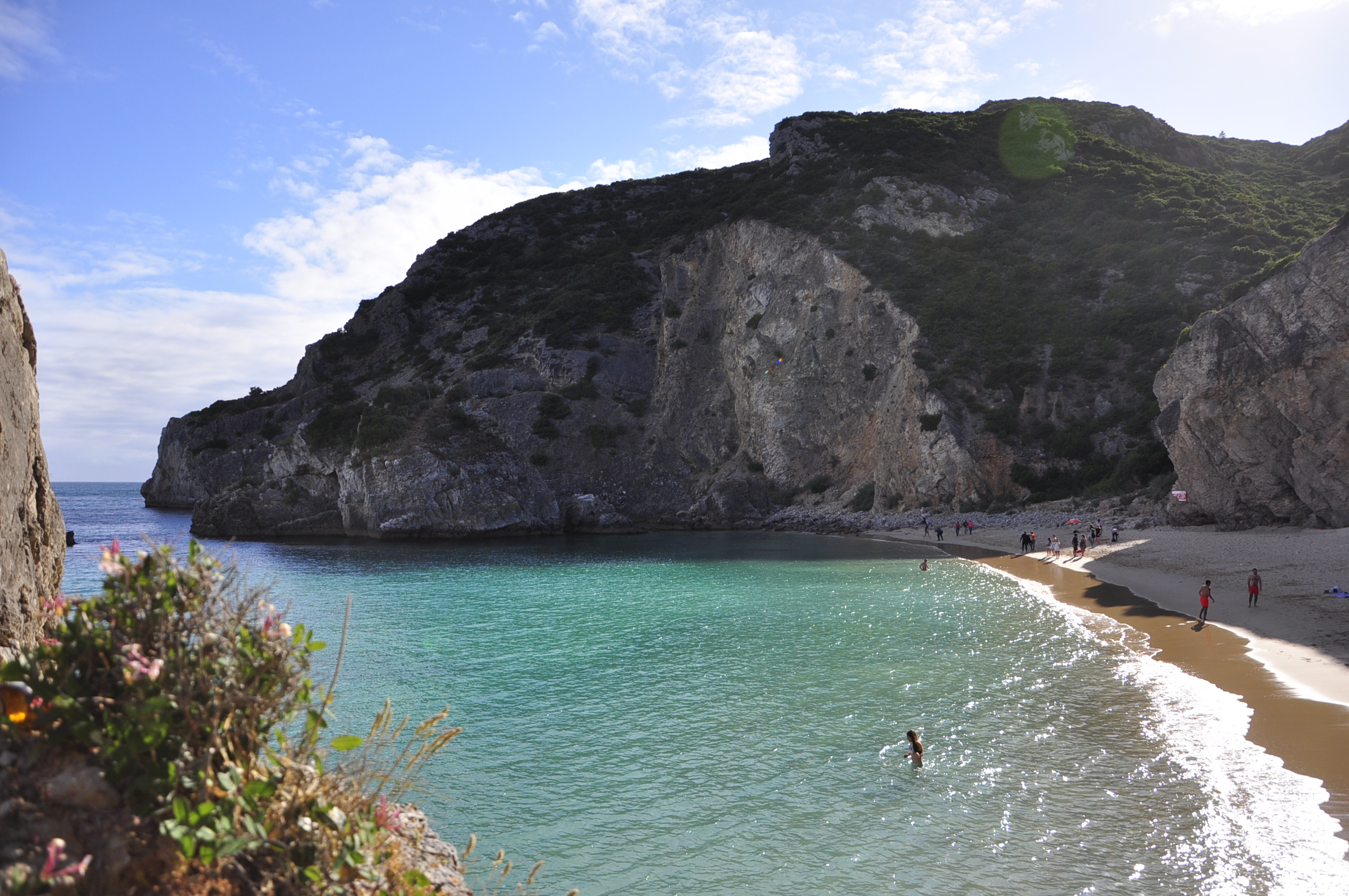
Ribeiro do Cavalo beach in Arrábida Natural Park

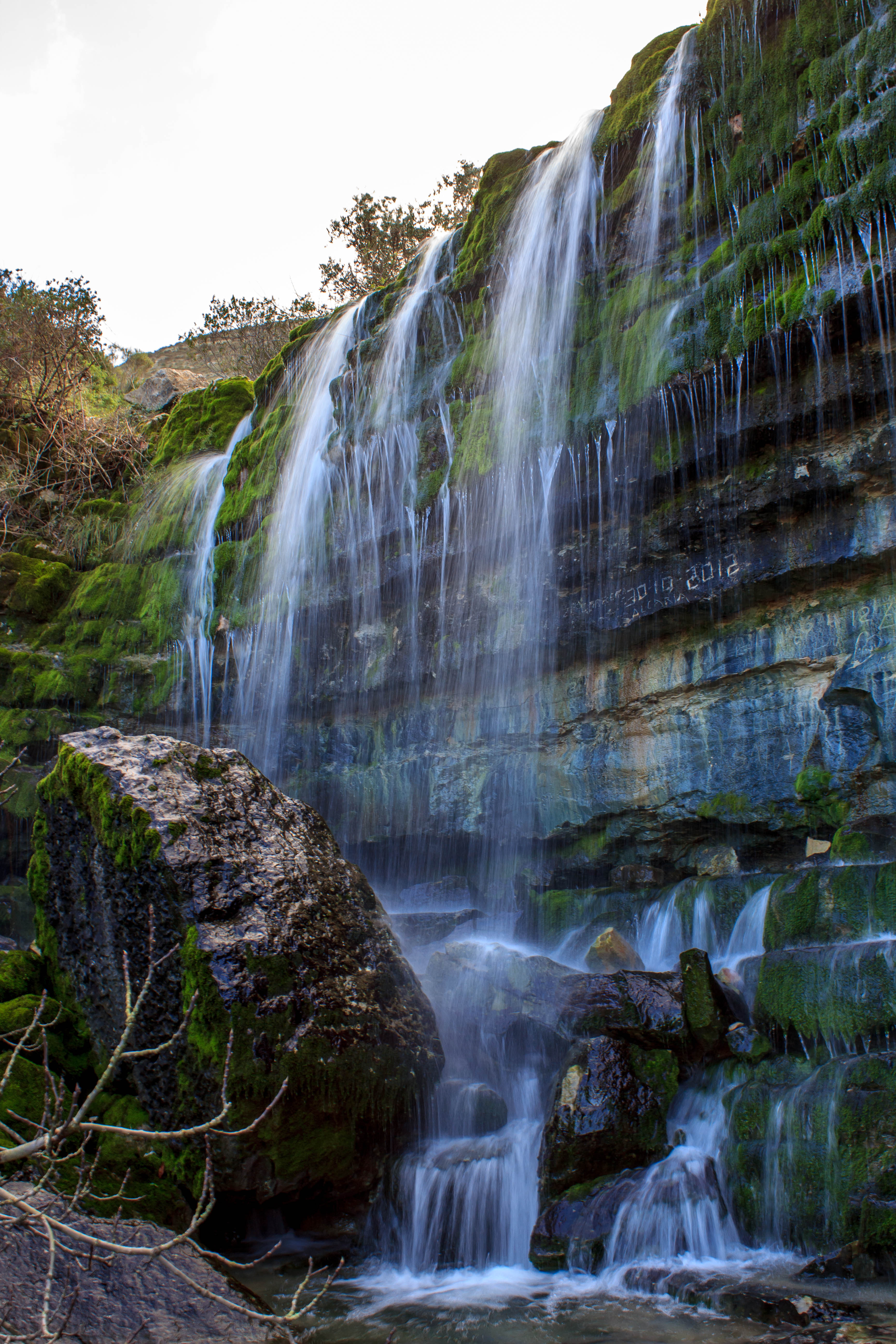
Fórnea Waterfall in Aire and Candeeiros Ranges Natural Park

The following table presents the number of visitors who contacted each of the protected areas of Portugal, according to ICNF

Protected Area	2018	2019	2020	2021	2022
Alvão	25,368	58,630	9,303	17,740	34,991
Arrábida	30,435	28,795	2,668	10,276	18,880
Arriba Fóssil da Costa da Caparica	1,498	2,267	645	1,069	2,516
Berlengas	40,505	44,078	540	?	?
Douro International	28,743	60,570	0	1,170	2,018
Dunas de São Jacinto	6,348	5,400	3,219	2,935	11,184
Estuário do Sado	85,543	82,242	54,643	53,838	62,576
Estuário do Tejo	1,713	1,853	312	99	263
Lagoas de Santo André e de Sancha	12,857	8,942	2,245	2,348	8,039
Litoral Norte	4,582	6,723	5,752	3,182	17,018
Madeira	6,180	5,894	5,458	5,731	6,724
Paul do Boquilobo	2,319	1,956	1,305	811	12,275
Peneda-Gerês	112,227	103,593	39,485	45,527	66,198
Paul de Arzila	1,236	860	841	992	1,363
Ria Formosa	46,662	60,061	17,202	16,805	25,997
Serra da Estrela	3,079	18,429	4,202	1,271	1,552
Sapal de Castro Marim e Vila Real de Santo António	7,642	7,999	1,375	3,429	7,367
Serra da Malcata	4,097	3,951	649	1,274	1,259
Serra de São Mamede	4,556	9,934	2,620	1,032	2,316
Serra do Açor	6,124	5,284	3,429	6,691	24,724
Serras de Aire e Candeeiros	43,435	44,326	15,691	13,422	40,313
Sintra-Cascais	58,127	52,774	12,912	22,184	28,467
Sudoeste Alentejano e Costa Vicentina	15,950	18,027	3,593	3,759	9,096
Tejo Internacional	*	38	*	*	130
Vale do Guadiana	332	1,306	32	170	4,930
Total	549,558	633,923	188,121	215,755	390,196

== UNESCO World Heritage sites ==
- List of World Heritage Sites in Portugal

== Souvenirs ==
The Rooster of Barcelos is bought by many tourists as a souvenir. The legend of the Rooster of Barcelos tells the story of a dead rooster's miraculous intervention in proving the innocence of a man who had been falsely accused and sentenced to death. The story is associated with the 17th-century calvary that is part of the collection of the Archeological Museum located in Paço dos Condes, a gothic-style palace in Barcelos, a city in the Braga District of northwest Portugal.

== See also ==
- Seven Wonders of Portugal
- Tourism in Lisbon
- List of museums in Portugal
- List of Portuguese dishes
- Portuguese cuisine
- Portuguese Riviera
