= Museum of the Orient =

Asian art museum in Portugal

Coordinates: 38.7029°N 9.1708°W

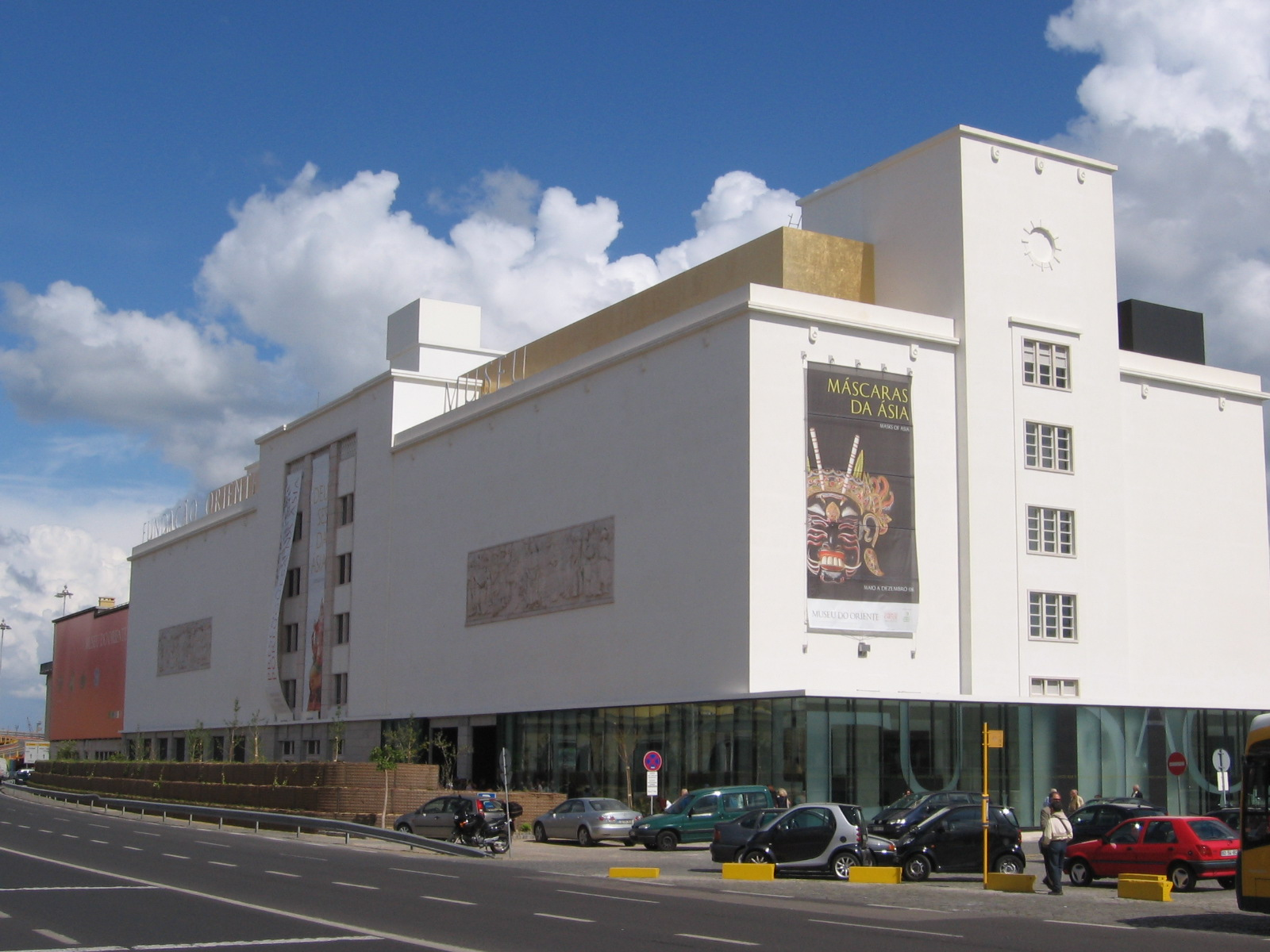
Outside view of Museu do Oriente.

The Museum of the Orient (Portuguese: Museu do Oriente) in Lisbon, Portugal is a museum of Asian art. The museum opened in May, 2008, and is located in a refurbished industrial building on the Alcântara waterfront. It has 7,000 m² of exhibition space, and a 355-seat auditorium. The collection includes Indonesian textiles and shadowplays, Japanese screens, antique snuff bottles, crucifixes made in Asia for Western export, and the Kwok On Collection of masks, costumes, and accessories. According to Condé Nast Traveler, the museum is "Illuminating a dialogue between East and West,...and addresses Portugal's influence on Asia through paintings, sculptures, ceramics and more."
