= Lisbon metropolitan area =

Metropolitan area in Portugal

Lisbon Metropolitan Area Área Metropolitana de Lisboa
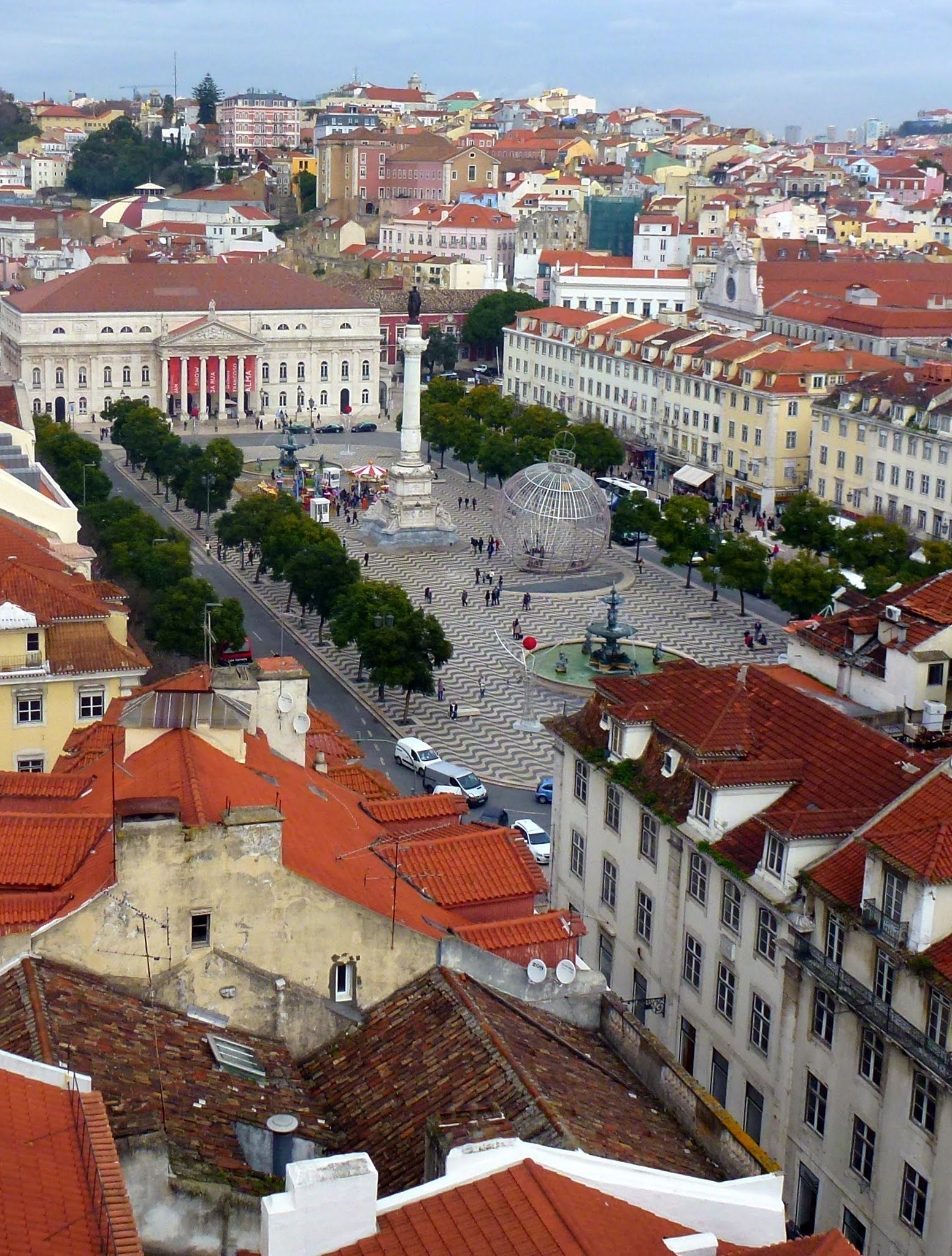
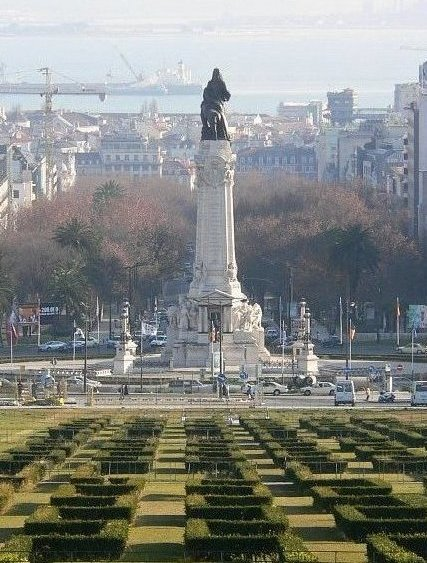
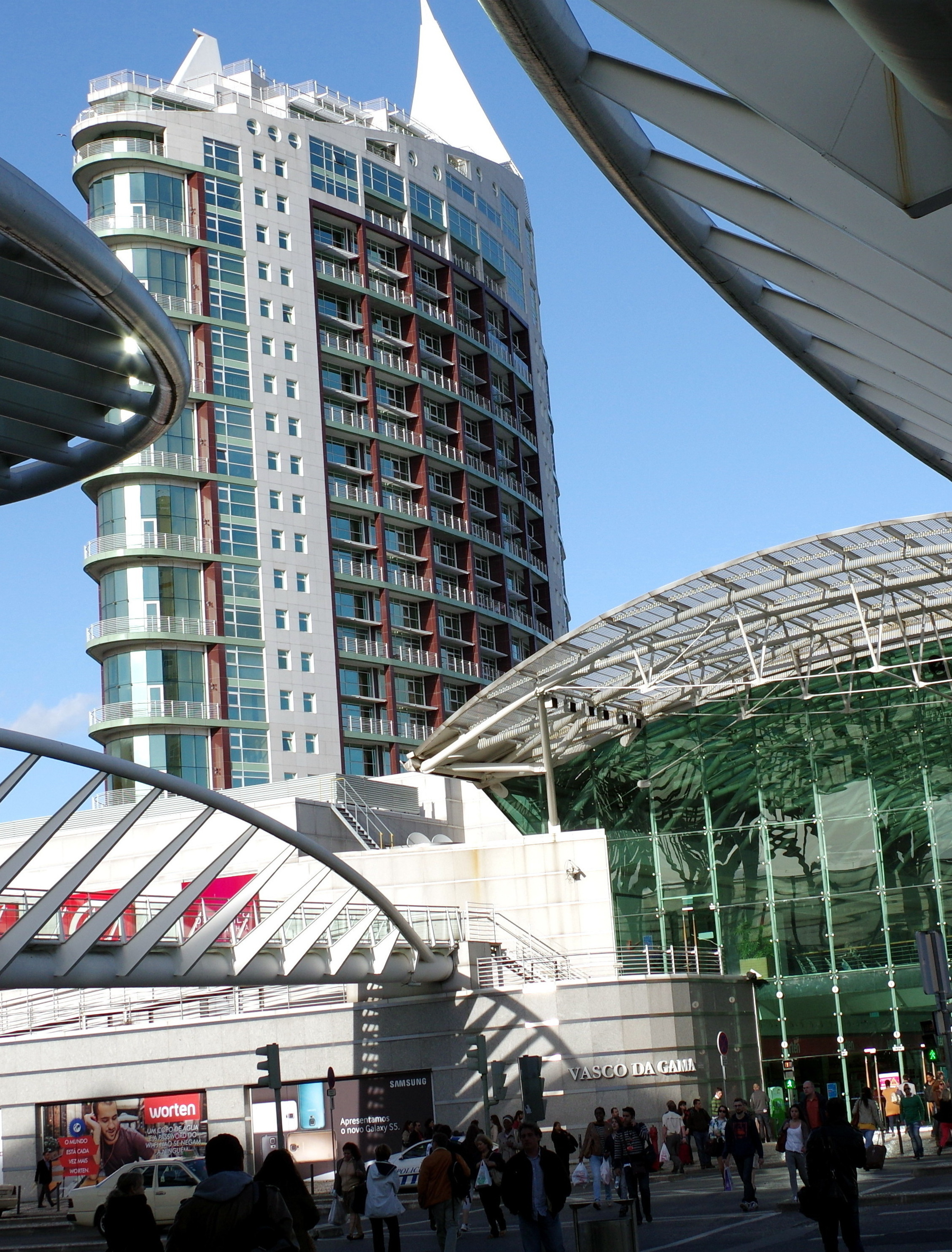
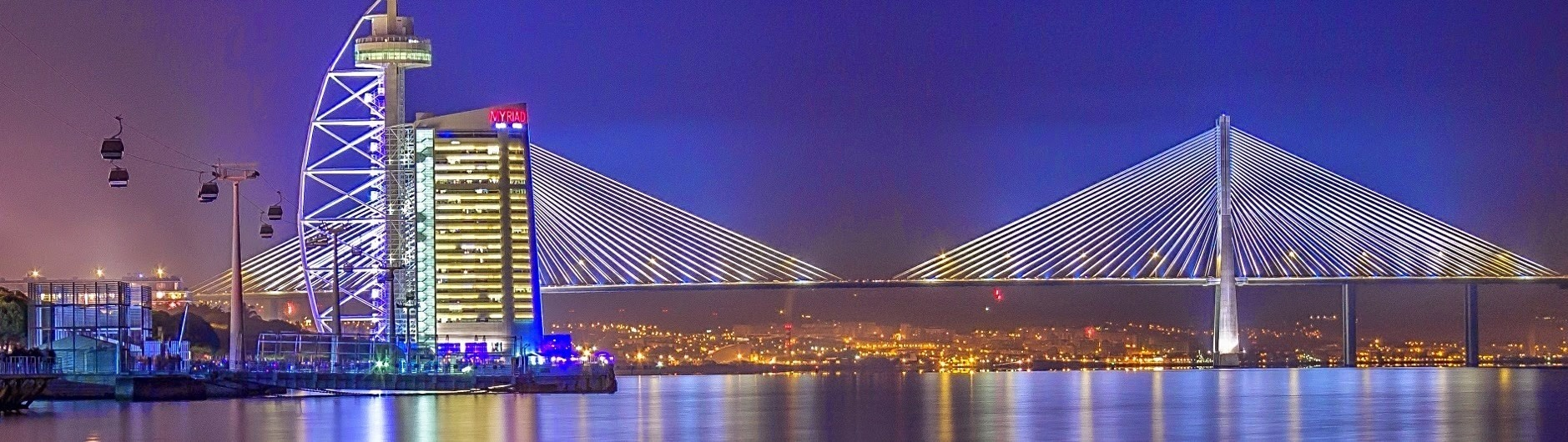
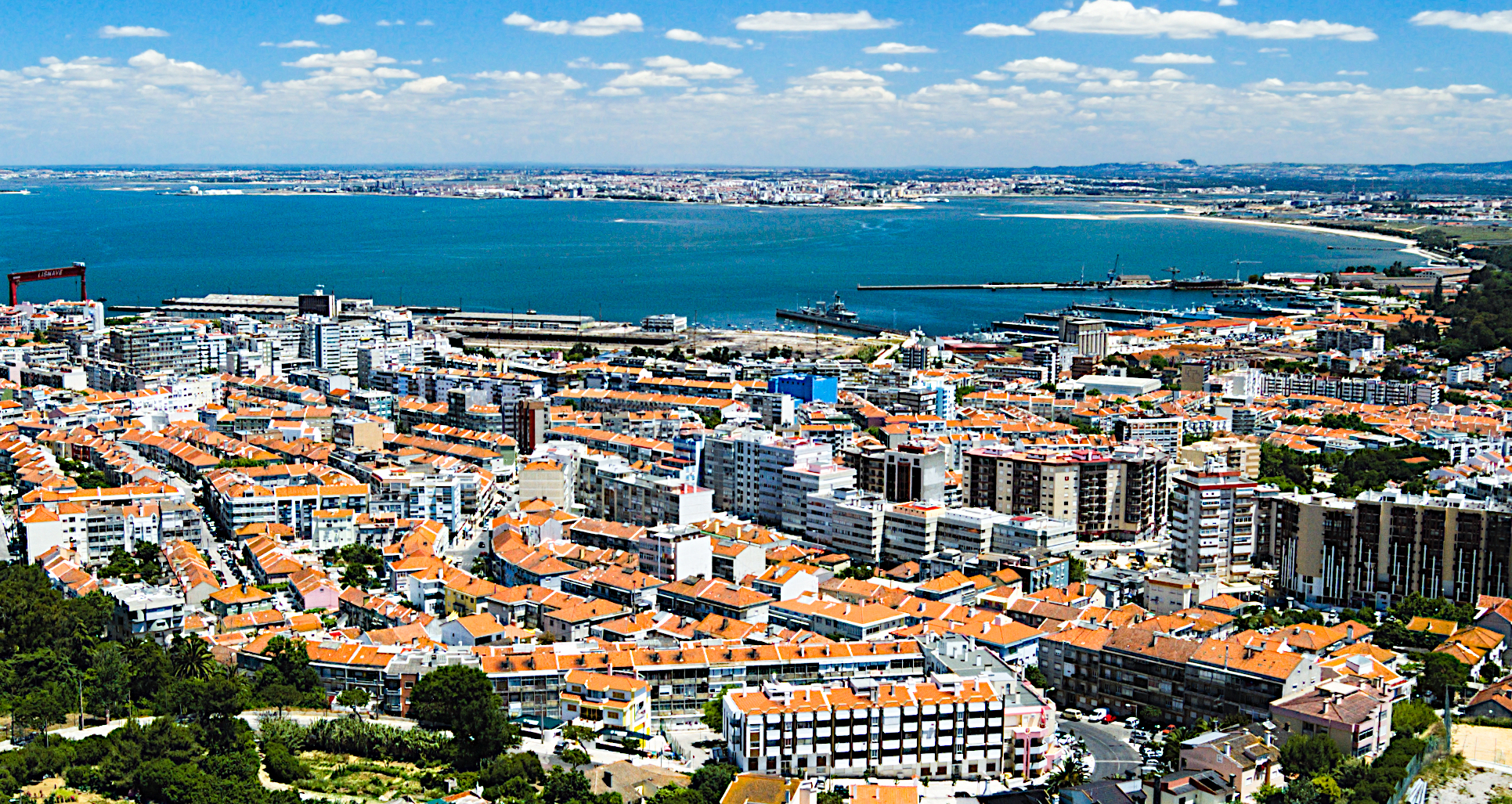
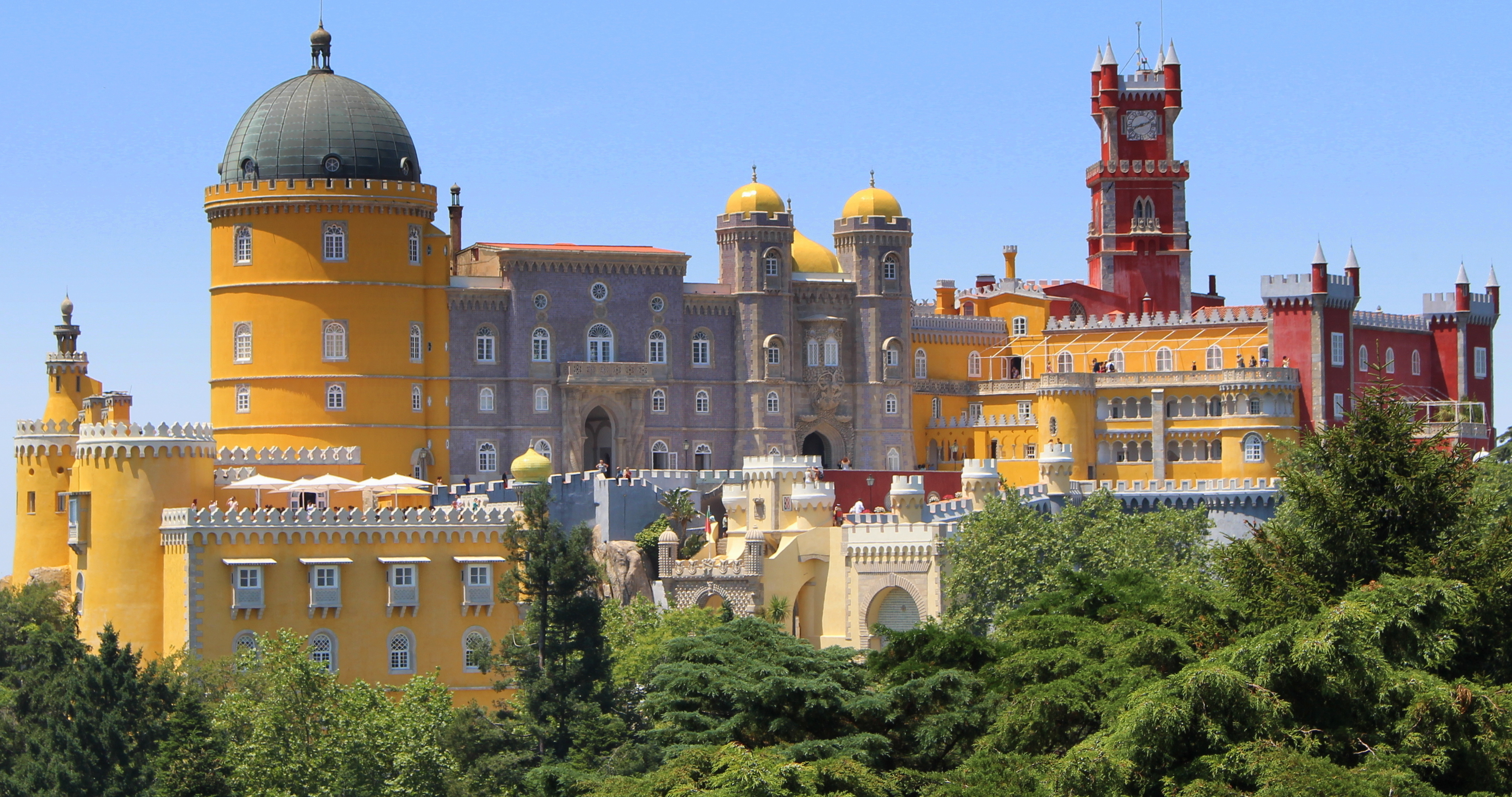
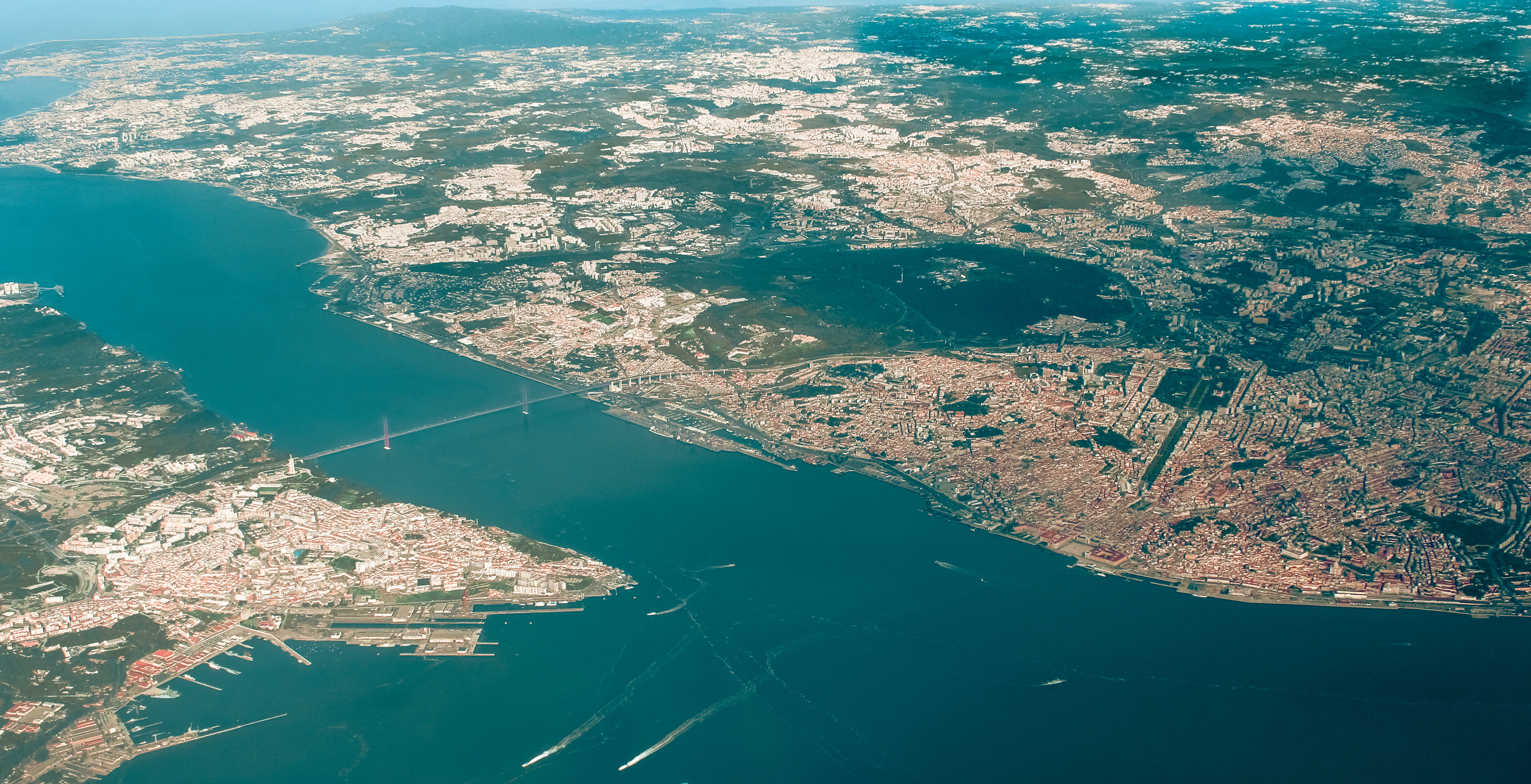
- Clockwise: view of the Rossio; view of Avenida da Liberdade from Marquis of Pombal Square; Parque das Nações; view of Vasco da Gama Bridge; Pena Palace in Sintra; aerial view of the Lisbon; view of Almada from the Christ the King statue.

- Core city: Lisbon
- Municipalities: Alcochete, Almada, Barreiro, Amadora, Cascais, Lisbon, Loures, Mafra, Moita, Montijo, Odivelas, Oeiras, Palmela, Seixal, Sintra, Sesimbra, Setúbal and Vila Franca de Xira.

Government
  - President: Carlos Moedas (PSD)

Area
  - Total: 3,015.24 km^{2} (1,164.19 sq mi)

Population (2025)
  - Total: 3,352,939
  - Density: 1,112.00/km^{2} (2,880.06/sq mi)

GDP (nominal)
  - Total: €106.006 billion (2024)
  - Per capita: €35,535 (2024)
- HDI (2021): 0.900 very high · 1st
- Website: Official website

The Lisbon metropolitan area (Portuguese: Área metropolitana de Lisboa; abbreviated as AML) is a metropolitan area in Portugal centered on Lisbon, the capital and largest city of the country. The metropolitan area, covering 17 cities in 18 municipalities, is the largest urban area in the country and the 11th largest in the European Union, with a population in 2025 of 3,352,939 in an area of 3,015.24 km².

The Lisbon Metropolitan Area has the largest GDP (€106 billion) of any metropolitan area in Portugal. The region is home to the largest tech hub in the country and a majority of Portugal's major multinational corporations by revenue are based there.

== History ==
Portugal has been through a period of administrative changes since the 1974 revolution. More recently, new standards of territorial administration have been implemented to match European Union criteria.

After some years of indefinitions, municipalities are now associated in metropolitan areas or intermunicipal communities. These new regional divisions are colliding with the traditional Portuguese regional structures: Distritos (Districts). Districts were implemented in the 19th century by Mouzinho da Silveira after the Liberal Revolution of 1820, to replace clerical dioceses (which held the intermediate authority between the absolute monarchy and the municipalities), and still are the official regional authorities in Portugal, thus leaving the new metropolitan authorities with no authority at all. For instance, the District of Lisbon and the District of Setubal collide and interfere with the Lisbon metropolitan area authority. Each District is ruled by a governador civil (civil governor). These governors are empowered by the Prime Minister of Portugal and have most of the administrative power over the municipalities comprised, leaving the metropolitan areas with a passive status and communitarian tasks.

As an administrative entity, the Lisbon metropolitan area was only created in 1991 in order to meet the needs of urban territories with a large population density surrounding the Portuguese capital.

To definitely end with these anomalies, a national Referendum was held on November 8, 1998, in order to approve a new regionalization, which was rejected by over 60% of the voting population on account of disagreements over the loss of sovereignty of some districts to others (e.g. by the time of the referendum it was not known where the seat of government of the new "Estremadura & Ribatejo" region would be, which was a fusion of the District of Leiria with the District of Santarém, Leiria and Santarém being cities of the same size and importance).

The Regionalization experiment in Portugal was only successful among insular regions like in 1976, when the districts of Angra do Heroísmo, Horta and Ponta Delgada were substituted by the Autonomous Region of Açores with the seat of government being in Ponta Delgada, while the district of Funchal was replaced by the Autonomous Region of Madeira with a seat of government in Funchal.

== Overview ==
The Lisbon metropolitan area, centered in the Portuguese capital city of Lisbon, is the largest population concentration in Portugal. The population in 2025 was 3,352,939, of whom 658 236 (19.6%) live in the city of Lisbon. About 29.3% of the total population of Portugal lives in the Lisbon metropolitan area. The area of the Lisbon metropolitan area is 3,015.24 km^{2}, which is 3.3% of the total area of Portugal.

The Lisbon metropolitan area has an active population of about 1.3 million people. With 32.7% of the national employment being located in its territory, the contribution of AML for the gross domestic product surpasses 36%.

Today, the Lisbon metropolitan area territory is almost the same as Lisbon Region territory, being AML a union of metropolitan municipalities, and Lisbon Region a NUTS II region.

It is bordered by the Oeste Intermunicipal Community (Central Region) to the north, Lezíria do Tejo to the northeast, Alentejo Central to the east and by Alentejo Litoral to the south, the former ones belonging to the wider Alentejo region.

The municipalities north of the Tagus River are from Lisbon District (Grande Lisboa); those south of the river are from Setubal District (Península de Setúbal).

== Structure ==
The metropolitan area of Lisbon was a semiofficial structure. Recently, Portugal has been incrementing the powers held by these territorial organization organs. In the officialization of the Lisbon Great Metropolitan Area, Azambuja left due to being mostly a rustic zone, more kindred to the city of Santarém which lies just 23 km northeast, while Lisbon is 45 km away from Azambuja, southeast.

In the official AML site is said:

As stated on the law 10/2003, of the 13 of May, the Grande Área Metropolitana de Lisboa (Lisbon Great Metropolitan Area) is a public collective person of associative nature, and of territorial scope that aims to reach common public interests of the municipalities that integrate it, that includes (18 Municipalities) – Alcochete, Almada, Barreiro, Cascais, Lisboa, Loures, Mafra, Moita, Montijo, Odivelas, Oeiras, Palmela, Sesimbra, Setúbal, Seixal, Sintra and Vila Franca de Xira.

The Grande Área Metropolitana de Lisboa was constituted, by public scripture, in 2004, and published on 5 July 2004, in the III series of the Diário da República. It is composed by three organs: ·

Junta Metropolitana, executive organ, composed by the 18 presidents of the city halls that it integrates. They elect among themselves, a president and two vice presidents.

Assembleia Metropolitana, legislative organ, composed by the chosen representatives in the municipal assembly of the city halls, in odd number, over the triple the number of the towns that it integrates, in a maximum of 55.

Conselho Metropolitano, consultative organ, composed by representatives of the state and by the members of the Junta Metropolitana.

== Municipalities ==
Municipality	Area (km^{2})	Population (2025)	N.U.T.S. III inclusion	District inclusion	Cultural Region
Amadora	23.78	205,517	Grande Lisboa	Lisboa	Estremadura
Cascais	97.40	242,619	Grande Lisboa	Lisboa	Estremadura
Lisbon	100.05	658,236	Grande Lisboa	Lisboa	Estremadura
Loures	167.24	236,988	Grande Lisboa	Lisboa	Estremadura
Mafra	291.66	96,146	Grande Lisboa	Lisboa	Estremadura
Odivelas	26.54	185,736	Grande Lisboa	Lisboa	Estremadura
Oeiras	45.88	188,056	Grande Lisboa	Lisboa	Estremadura
Sintra	319.23	449,956	Grande Lisboa	Lisboa	Estremadura
Vila Franca de Xira	318.19	152,007	Grande Lisboa	Lisboa	Ribatejo
Alcochete	128.36	20,407	Península de Setúbal	Setúbal	Estremadura
Almada	70.21	202,896	Península de Setúbal	Setúbal	Estremadura
Barreiro	36.39	91,766	Península de Setúbal	Setúbal	Estremadura
Moita	55.26	78,541	Península de Setúbal	Setúbal	Estremadura
Montijo	348.62	68,064	Península de Setúbal	Setúbal	Estremadura
Palmela	465.12	77,044	Península de Setúbal	Setúbal	Estremadura
Seixal	95.50	198,254	Península de Setúbal	Setúbal	Estremadura
Sesimbra	195.47	59,440	Península de Setúbal	Setúbal	Estremadura
Setúbal	230.33	141,266	Península de Setúbal	Setúbal	Estremadura
Total	2,957.4	3,352,939			

=== Maps ===
Railway network of Lisbon's metro area.

Metro and light-rail networks of Lisbon's metro area.

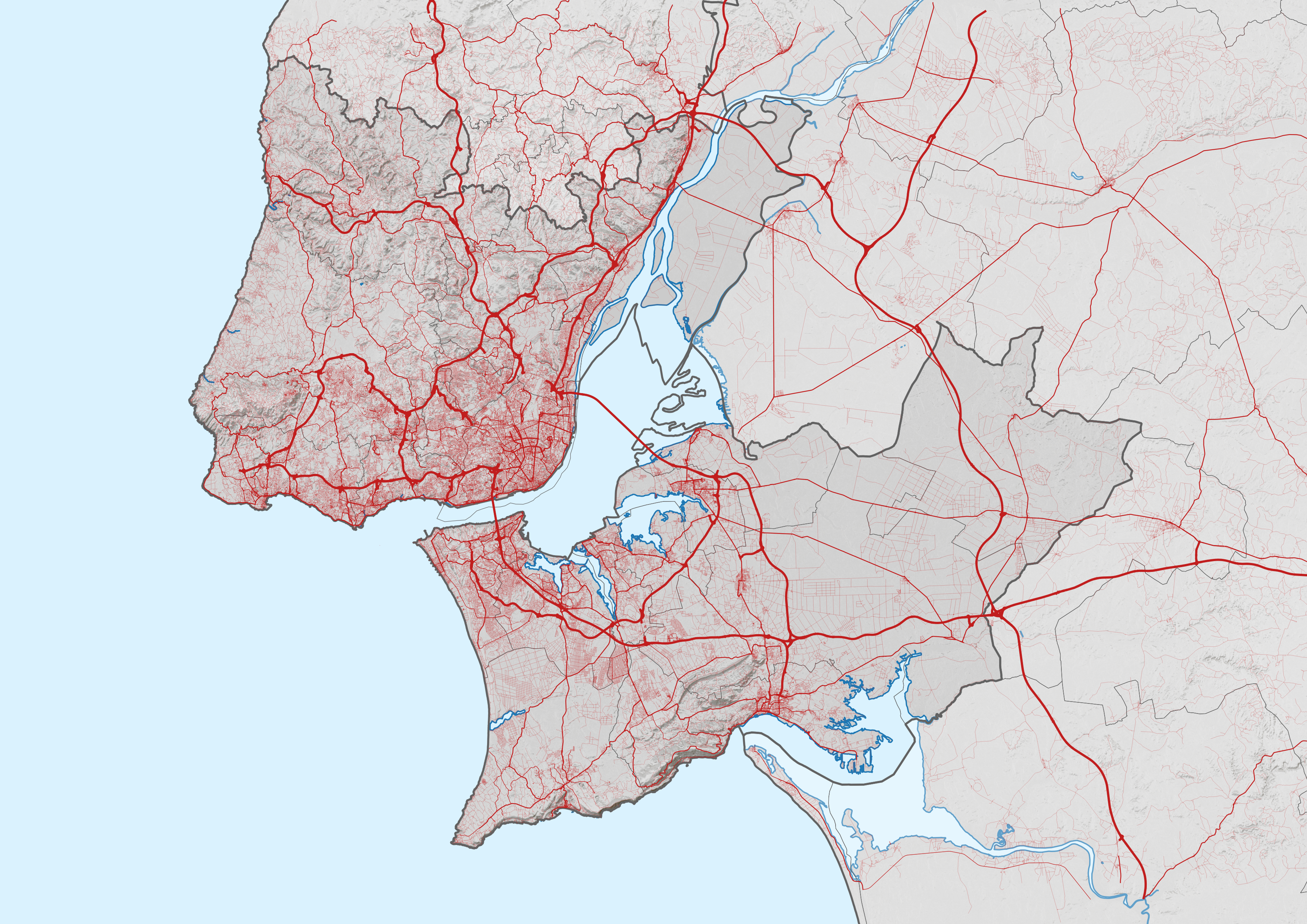
Road network of Lisbon's metro area.

Highway network of Lisbon's metro area.

== See also ==
- Tourism in Lisbon
- LisboaViva
