= Museu das Comunicações =

Museum in Lisbon, Portugal

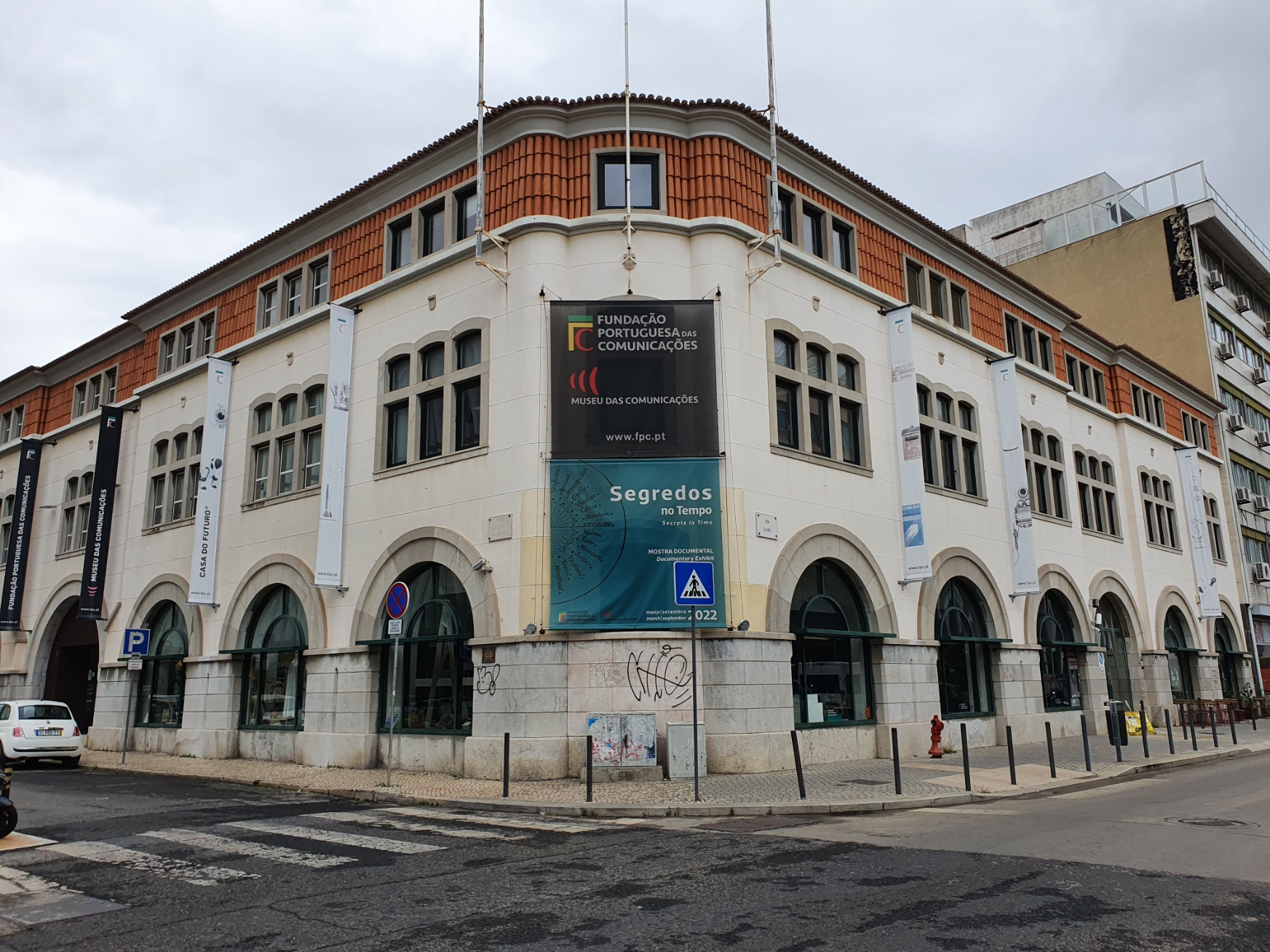
- Museu das Comunicações main entrance
- Established: 6 October 1997
- Location: R. do Instituto Industrial 16, 1200-225 Lisbon, Portugal
- Coordinates: 38.7079°N 9.1503°W
- Website: https://www.fpc.pt/pt/

The Museu das Comunicações is a technology museum in Lisbon, Portugal. Dedicated to promote the study, conservation and dissemination of the historical, scientific and technological communications heritage, the museum focuses on the history of communication, particularly in Portugal. The museum opened on 6 October 1997.

== History ==
The building was created by the architect João Simões Antunes, and housed a factory, which later became a telecommunications center. Originally owned by Instituto Superior Técnico (a Portuguese engineering university), the building was sold to the company H. Vaultier in 1944. The Portuguese Communications Foundation inherited the building, and it became a museum which opened on 6 October 1997.

== Exhibits ==
The museum houses permanent exhibits highlighting the history of communications in Portugal, as well as rotating exhibitions of contemporary art. It is based on the museological collections of the state regulatory agency, Autoridade Nacional de Comunicações (ANACOM), the postal service, CTT Correios de Portugal, and Altice Portugal, a telecoms provider formerly known as Portugal Telecom. The museum displays five centuries of Portuguese communication history, with items on display dating back as far as the 16th century. Collections are divided into three sections: postal collections, telecommunications collections and art and philately collections. In addition to this, the centre houses a large library and archive, as well as a shop.

== Gallery ==
A few of the exhibits are shown below:

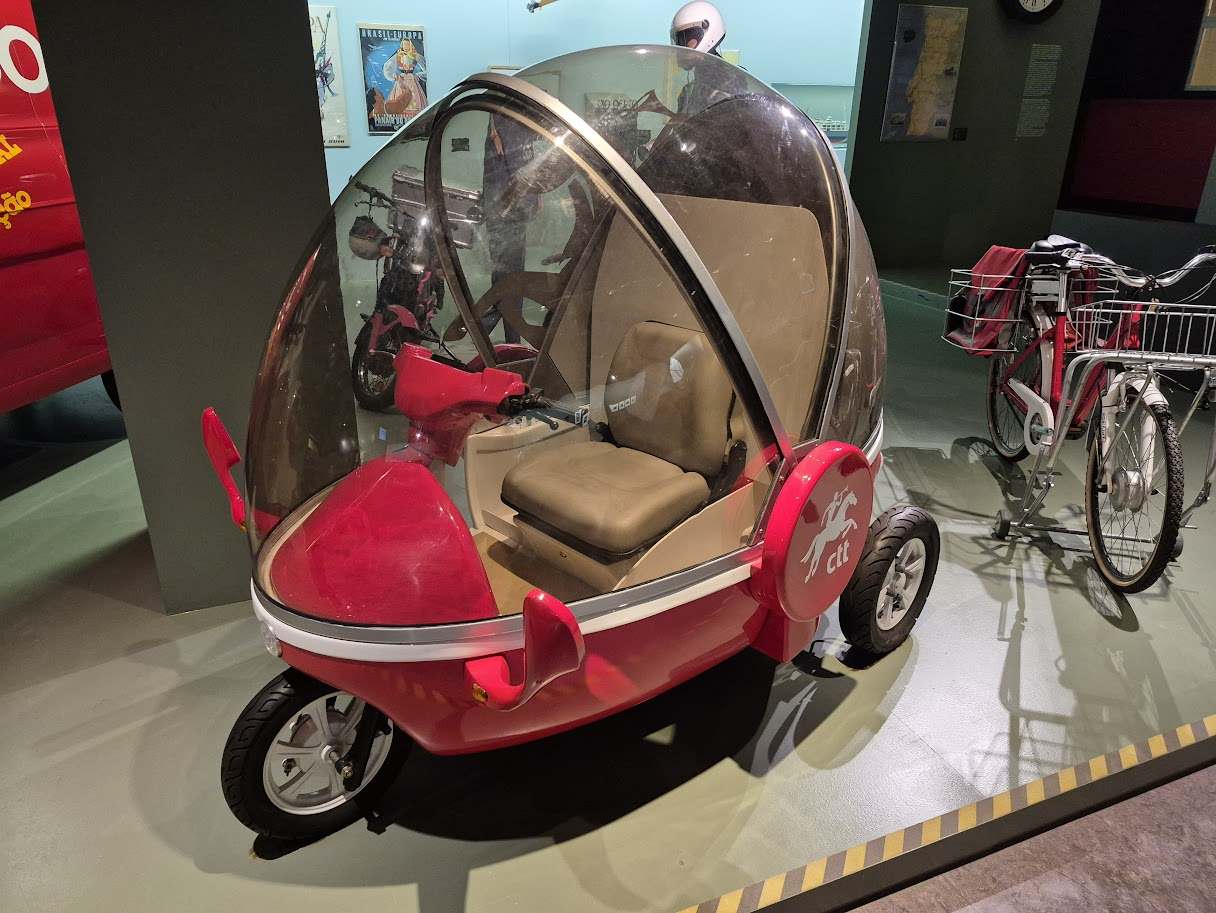
Battery-powered delivery car

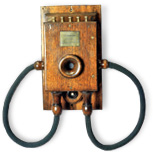
Wall phone

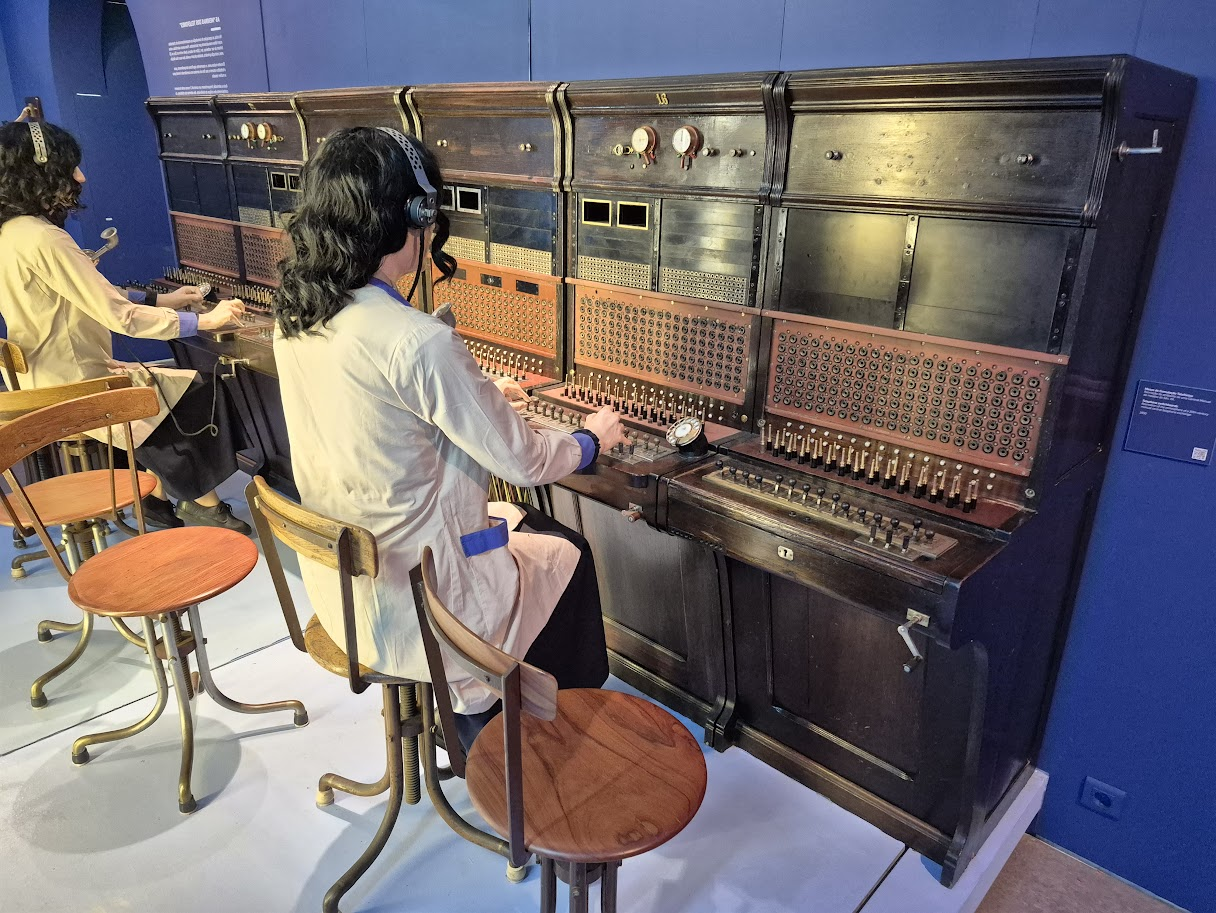
Early switchboard
