= Protected areas of Portugal =

The Protected areas of Portugal (Portuguese: Áreas protegidas de Portugal) are classified under a legal protection statute that allows for the adequate protection and maintenance of biodiversity, while providing services for ecosystem that maintains the natural and geological patrimony.

== History ==
Protected areas are regulated by Decree-Law 142/2008 (24 July 2008), and can be classified by the national authority, or even by public or private institutions. The applicant is analyzed by the Instituto da Conservação da Natureza e das Florestas (Nature and Forest Conservancy Institute), while regional or local classifications can be completed by municipalities or groups of municipalities, under terms of Article 15.

The typical classifications that exist in Portugal are: national park, nature reserve, protected landscapes or natural monuments. Except for the national park designation, local or regional classifications can adopt whichever designation is appropriate, as long as they are accompanied by the "regional" or "local" qualifiers ("regional" when they involve more than one municipality and "local" when they only include one local authority. Decree-Law 142/2008 24 July 2008), also allows for the creation of Áreas Protegidas de estatuto privado (APP) (Private Protected Areas), based on the application of the respective property-owners. A proposing candidate is governed by the ICNF, and regulated by ordinance 1181/2009, 7 October 2009. National protected areas (APs) and Private protected areas automatically pertain to the Rede Nacional de Áreas Protegidas (National Network of Protected Areas); in the case of regional or local APs, their integration within this network is dependent on the evaluation of the national authority.

Scattered across the country, are various areas defined due to their European ecological interest, and have been classified within the context of the Nature 2000 network. Meanwhile, other areas fall within international nature conservation networks, such as Biogenetic Reserves (Council of Europe), Ramsar Sites (Ramsar Convention), Biosphere Reserves (MAB/UNESCO) and sites covered by the Convention Concerning the Protection of World Cultural and Natural Heritage (UNESCO).

== National ==
	Peneda-Gerês
Corno do Bico	Montesinho
Lagoa de Bertiandos e São Pedro de Arco	Albufeira de Azibo
Litoral norte	Alvão
Dunas de São Jacinto	Douro Internacional
Paul de Arzila
Montes de Santa Olaia e Ferrestelo	Serra da Estrela
Serras de Aire e Candeeiros	Serra da Malcata
Monte de São Bartolomeu	Serra do Açor
Berlengas	Tejo internacional
Serra de Montejunto	Pegadas de Dinossauros
C. Lapiaz da Granja dos Serrões	Paul do Boquilobo
Granja dos Serrões e Negrais	Serra de São Mamede
	Açude da Agolada
Sintra-Cascais	Centro Histórico de Coruche
Carenque	Açude do Monte da Barca
Arriba Fóssil da C. Caparica	Estuário do Tejo
Pedreira do Avelino	Estuário do Sado
Lagosteiros	Lagoa de St. André e Sancha
Pedra da Mua	Vale do Guadiana
Gruta do Zambujal	Fonte Benémola
Arrábida	S.C.Marim-V.R.S. António
Sudoeste Alentejano e Costa Vicentina	Ria Formosa
	Rocha da Pena e Fonte Benémola

=== National Parks ===
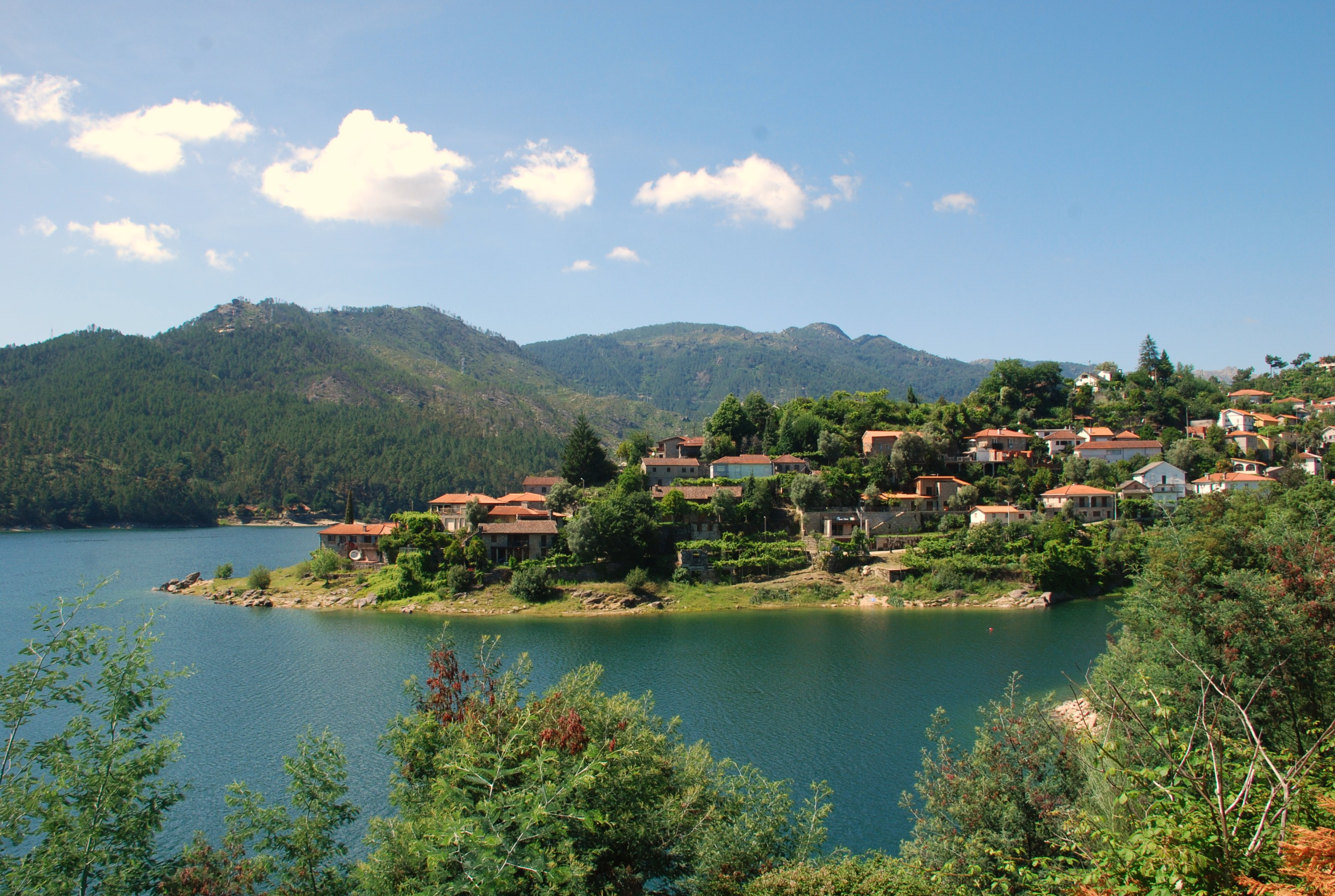
Admeus, within the Penede-Gerês National park, showing the diverse nature of the only national park

Areas classified as national parks encompass regions that represent natural regional characteristics that demonstrate a biodiversity of natural and human landscapes, as well as geosites with scientific, ecological or educational value. The classification of an area as a national park is influenced by the region's natural value, conserving the ecological integrity of the ecosystem, its constituent elements and ecological processes within that territory, and prevent intensive exploitation by adapting of compatible measures for the region's conservancy. Peneda-Gerês National Park is the only designated national park in Portugal; located in the northwest corner of the territory, it belongs to the PAN Parks network.

The Peneda-Gerês National Park has a variety of oak and mixed-forests, interspersed by groves, peat bogs, and diverse bushlands. The golden eagle, the eagle owl, the European honey buzzard, and the whinchat are some of the 147 Portuguese birds that can be found in Gerês. Along with the pine marten, the stoat, the wolf, the brown bear, the wild goat, the adders (Vipera latastei and Vipera seoanei) and a number of squirrel species.

=== Nature Park ===
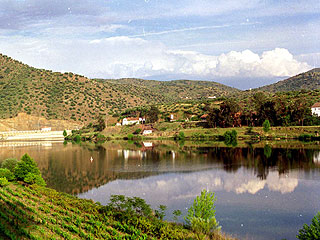
The Douro River winding through the Douro International Nature Park

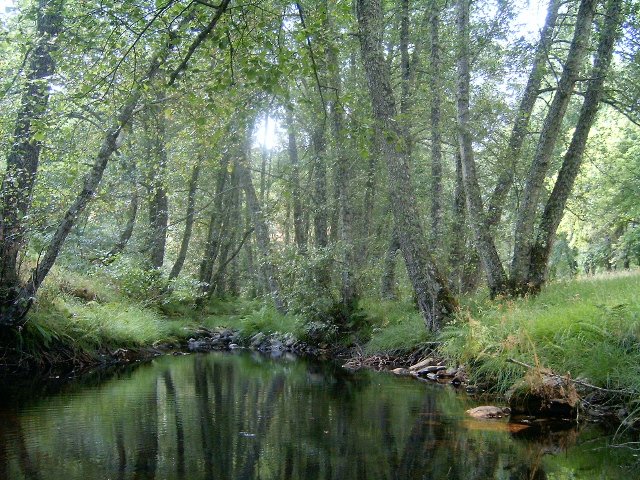
The rich forests of the Montesinho Nature Park

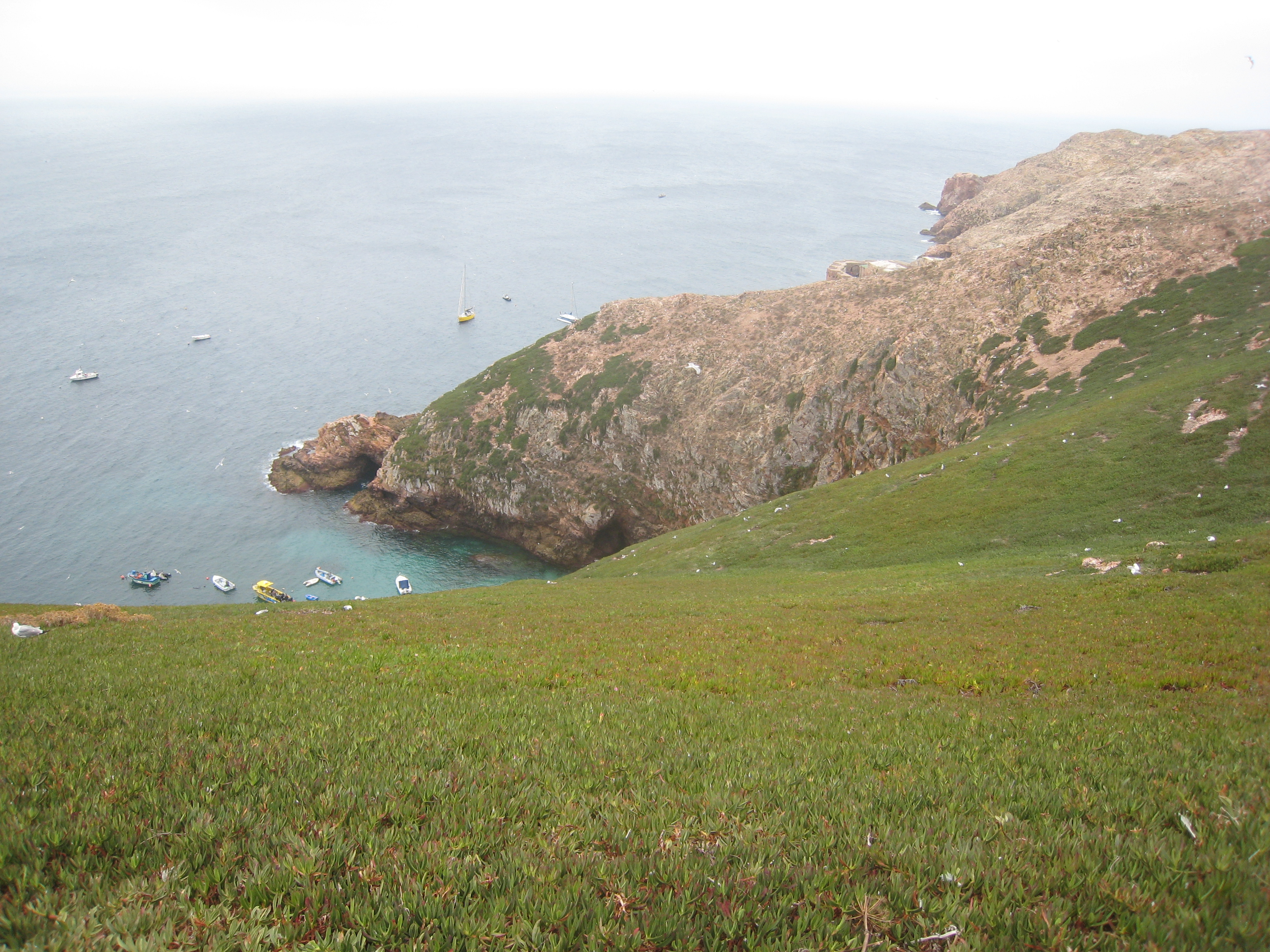
The sandstone outcroppings of Berlenga Grande in the archipelago and nature reserve

Nature parks are designated based on their natural and semi-natural areas, where the preservation of biodiversity is influenced by human activities, and which requires the propagation of a sustainable flow between natural and human services. The classification of a nature park is influenced by the natural characteristics of the region that affect the regional or national development.

- International Nature Park of the Douro (Portuguese: Parque Natural do Douro International)
- International Nature Park of the Tagus (Portuguese: Parque Natural do Tejo International)
- Nature Park of Alvão (Portuguese: Parque Natural de Alvão)
- Nature Park of Arrábida (Portuguese: Parque Natural de Arrábida), located in the peninsula of Setúbal, is a region of Mediterranean character, with a variety of sandy beaches;
- Nature Park of Montesinho (Portuguese: Parque Natural de Montesinho)
- Nature Park of Sintra-Cascais (Portuguese: Parque Natural de Sintra-Cascais)
- Nature Park of Southwest Alentejo and Saint Vincent Coast (Portuguese: Parque Natural do Sudoeste Alentjano e Costa Vincentina)
- Guadiana Valley Natural Park (Portuguese: Parque Natural do Vale do Guadiana)
- Nature Park of the Northern Coast (Portuguese: Parque Natural de Litoral Norte)
- Nature Park of the Ria Formosa (Portuguese: Parque Natural da Ria Formosa)
- Nature Park of the Serra da Estrela (Portuguese: Parque Natural da Serra da Estrela), in central Portugal, is an extensive range of valleys and turf soils;
- Nature Park of the Serra de São Mamede (Portuguese: Parque Natural da Serra de São Mamede)
- Aire and Candeeiros Ranges Natural Park (Portuguese: Parque Natural das Serras de Aires e Candeeiros)

=== Nature Reserves ===
A Nature reserve is an area with ecological, geological and physiographic characteristics, as well as other attributes of a scientific, ecological or education value, and unoccupied by humans in a permanent or at a significant level. The classification of an area as a nature reserve is based on their natural characteristics, whose protection will result in future benefits to use or appreciate the area's resources. The zones should remain unaltered by human activity during a prolonged period of time.

- Nature Reserve of the Berlengas (Portuguese: Reserva Natural das Berlengas)
- Nature Reserve of the Sado Estuary (Portuguese: Reserva Natural do Estuário do Sado)
- Nature Reserve of the Tagus Estuary (Portuguese: Estuário do Tejo)
- Nature Reserve of the Dunes of São Jacinto (Portuguese: Reserva Natural das Dunas de São Jacinto)
- Nature Reserve of the Santo André and Sancha Lakes (Portuguese: Lagoas de Santo André e Sancha)
- Nature Reserve of the Arzila Bog (Portuguese: Reserva Natural do Paul de Arzila)
- Nature Reserve of the Boquilobo Bog (Portuguese: Reserva Natural do Paul de Boquilobo)
- Nature Reserve of the Castro Marim and Vila Real de Santo António Marshes (Portuguese: Reserva Natural do Sapal de Castro Marim-Vila Real de Santo António)
- Nature Reserve of the Serra da Malcata (Portuguese: Reserva Natural da Serra da Malcata)

=== Protected Landscapes ===
Protected landscapes result from the interaction between human and natural use, and may demonstrate an aesthetic, ecological or cultural value. The classification of an area as a protected landscape envisions the protection of natural and cultural uses that exist in the area, highlighting the local use and adopting methods to sustain the spaces.

- Protected Landscape of the Fossil Coast of Costa da Caparica (Portuguese: Paisagem Protegida da Arriba Fóssil da Costa da Caparica)
- Protected Landscape of the Serra do Açor (Portuguese: Paisagem Protegida da Serra do Açor)

=== Natural Monument ===
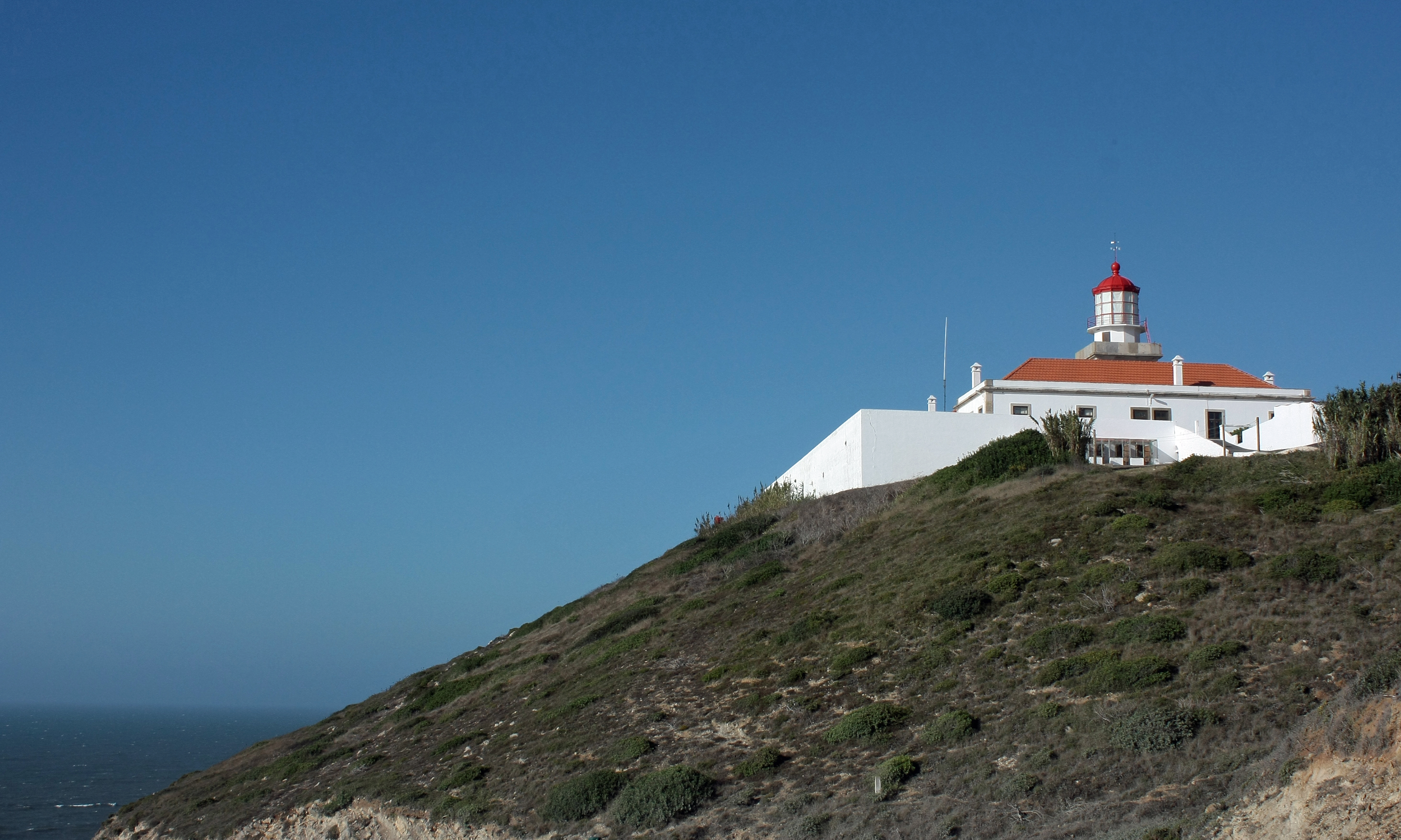
The Cabo Mondego Lighthouse, sentinel along the Cape of Mondego

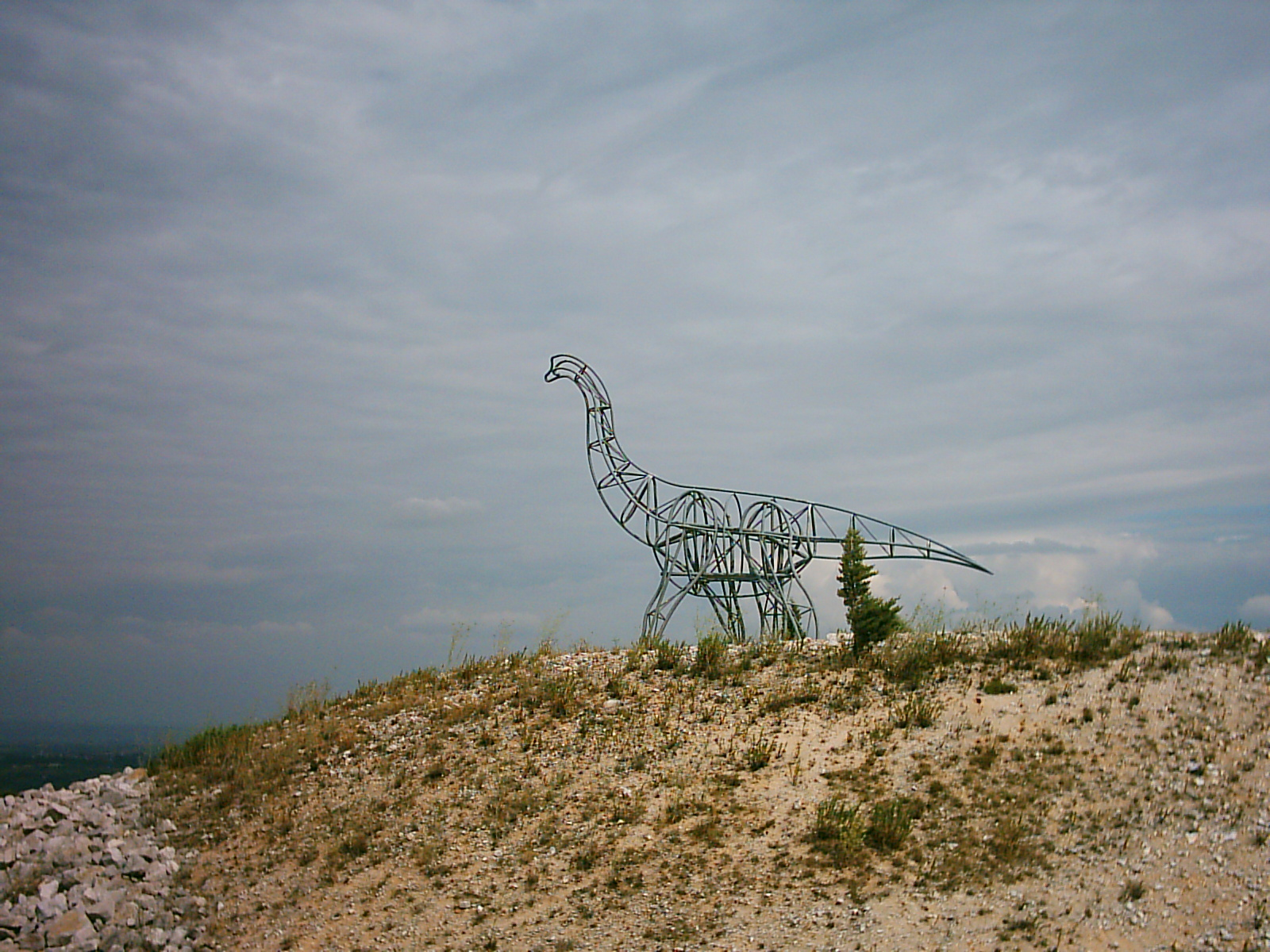
Symbolizing the sauropods that once roamed through Serras de Aire e Candeeiros Natural Park

A Natural monument is a naturally formed occurrence with a singular, rare our representative characteristics in terms of its ecologic, aesthetic, scientific or cultural value, requiring its conservation and maintenance. This classification envisions the protection of its natural value, namely notable occurrences of geological patrimony, the integrity of its characteristics and the areas immediately around them, with the adoption of constraints to limit inappropriate use.

- Cabo Mondego Natural Monument (Portuguese: Monumento Natural de Cabo Mondego)
- Natural Monument of Carenque (Portuguese: Monumento Natural de Carenque)
- Natural Monument of Lagosteiros (Portuguese: Monumento Natural de Lagosteiros)
- Natural Monument of Pedra da Mua (Portuguese: Monumento Natural da Pedro da Mua)
- Pedreira do Avelino Natural Monument (Portuguese: Monumento Natural da Pedreira do Avelino)
- Pegadas de Dinossáurios da Serra de Aire Natural Monument (Portuguese: Monumento Natural das Pegadas de Dinossauros de Serra de Aire)
- Portas de Ródão Natural Monument (Portuguese: Monumento Natural das Portas de Ródão)

=== Private Protected Areas ===
APPs are private lands, not included within Protected Areas, where the natural characteristics (its rarity, scientific, ecological, social or scenic value) require measures to protect, conserve and manage their continuity. The designation is effected through a request by the specific property-owner, requiring a special candidacy (regulated by ordinance 1181/2009, 7 October 2009) and the recognition by the national authority. The lands which are designated APPs fall within the RNAP network, and remain subject to the management protocols of the national authority.

- Private Protected Area of Faia Brava (Portuguese: Área Protegida Privada de Faia Brava)

The Madeira Natural Park protects a very rare type of subtropical rainforest (Laurissilva), and has been designated a UNESCO heritage site. In addition to this special area, the autonomous regions of Madeira and the Azores have several areas designated under protection for species and habitat conservation.

The Tapada Nacional de Mafra is conspicuous, due to its rich flora and fauna. The Tapada was created in the reign of King John V for the royal delight of the monarch, as a hunting preserve. With an area of 8 km^{2} the park included species of stag, boar, fox, rapine birds and several other species. Today, the Tapada is classified as a national hunting zone (Portuguese: Zona de Caça Nacional).

== Regional/Local ==
Protected areas in the regional or local domain were created to manage areas by group or municipalities or municipal authorities, and include: Nature Parks, Natuer Reserves, Protected Landscapes and Natural Monuments, using the "regional" or "local" qualifier. Under Decree-Law 19/93, 23 January 1993, the following protected landscapes were identified:

- Regional Protected Landscape of the Azibo Reservoir (Portuguese: Paisagem Protegida Regional de Albufeira do Azibo)
- Regional Protected Landscape of Corno do Bico (Portuguese: Paisagem Protegida Regional do Corno do Pico)
- Regional Protected Landscape of Bertiandos Lake and São Pedro dos Arcos (Portuguese: Paisagem Protegida Regional da Lagoa de Bertiandos e São Pedro dos Arcos)
- Regional Protected Landscape of Serra de Montejunto (Portuguese: Paisagem Protegida Regional da Serra de Montejunto

Designated under Decree 142/2008, 24 July 2008, the following regional or local areas have been established:

- Local Nature Reserve of the Douro Estuary (Portuguese: Reserva Natural Local do Estuário do Douro)
- Local Nature Reserve of the Tornada Bog (Portuguese: Reserva Natural Local do Paul de Tornada)
- Regional Nature Reserve of the Vila do Conde Coast and Orthinological Reserve of Mindelo (Portuguese: Paisagem Protegida Regional do Litoral de Vila do Conde Reserva Ornitológica do Mindelo)
- Local Protected Landscape of the Agolada Weir (Portuguese: Paisagem Protegida Local do Açude da Agolada)
- Local Protected Landscape of the Monte da Barca Weir (Portuguese: Paisagem Protegida Local do Açude Monte da Barca)
- Local Protected Landscape of Rocha da Pena (Portuguese: Paisagem Protegida Local da Rocha da Pena)
- Local Protected Landscape of Fonte Benémola (Portuguese: Nature Paisagem Protegida Local da Fonte Benémola)

== Natura 2000 ==
Several places in Portugal (national parks, natural parks, reserves or protected landscapes) are protected under the European Natura 2000 programme, designed to protect the most seriously threatened habitats and species across Europe.

== Geoparques ==
Two extensive areas of Portugal have been designated as Geoparks on account of their outstanding geological heritage. Arouca and Naturtejo are member Geoparks of the European Geoparks Network and the UNESCO Global Network of National Geoparks. Though not statutory designations under Portuguese or European law, membership of these networks affords additional protection to the geological heritage of the areas.

== See also ==
- Forests of the Iberian Peninsula
- Quercus (association)
