= Boquilobo Bog Natural Reserve =

Marshland and nature reserve in Portugal

Boquilobo Bog Nature Reserve
- IUCN category IV (habitat/species management area)
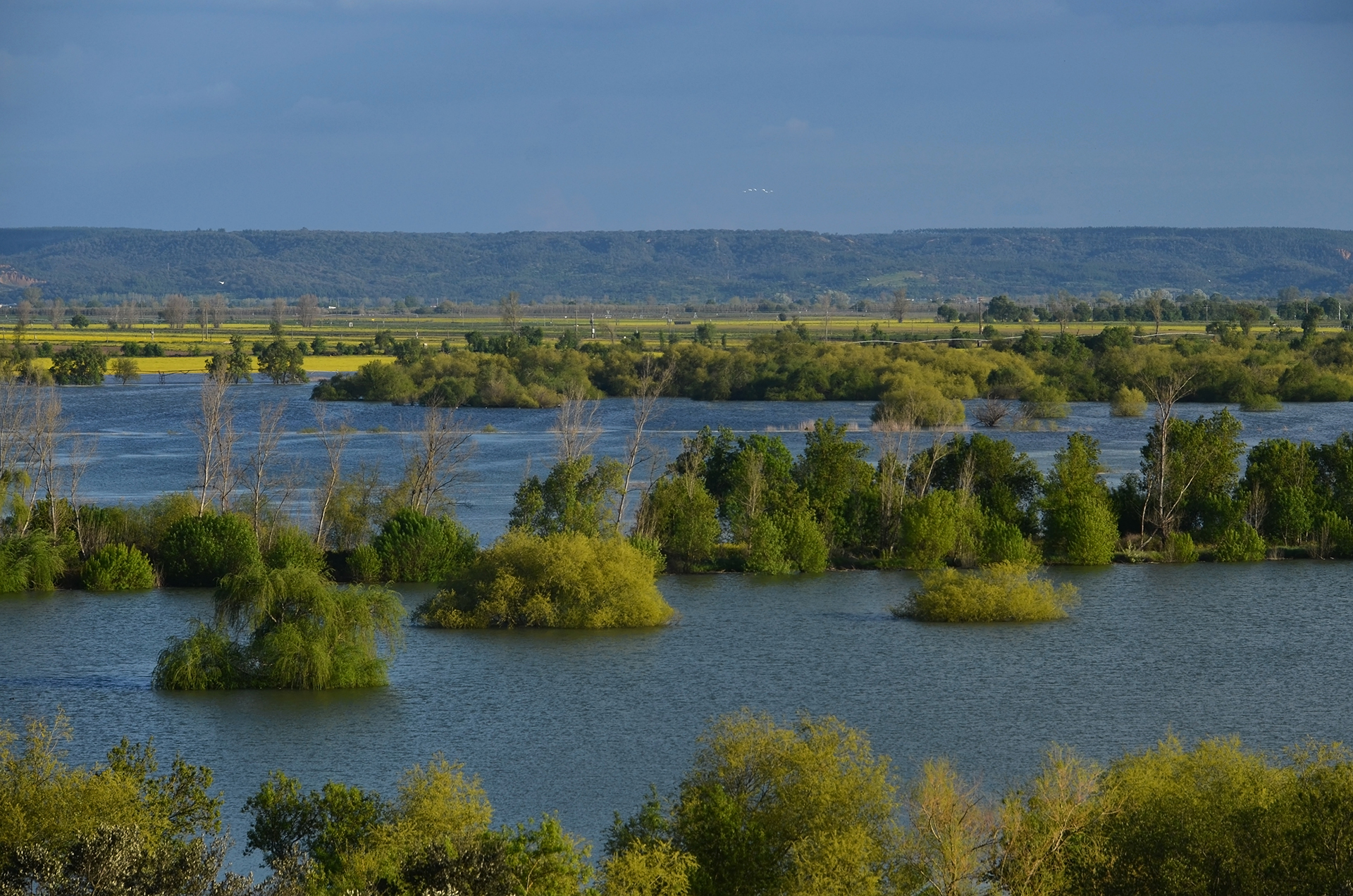

- Location within Portugal
- Location: Santarém District, Portugal
- Coordinates: 39°23′N 8°32′W
- Area: 8.18 hectares (20.2 acres)
- Established: 1980
- Website: Reserva Natural do Boquilobo

Ramsar Wetland
- Official name: Paúl do Boquilobo
- Designated: 8 May 1996
- Reference no.: 824

Boquilobo Bog Nature Reserve is a marshland and nature reserve located near Golegã, central Portugal. It is a UNESCO biosphere reserve since 1981 and a Ramsar wetland since 1996.

== Flora ==
Due to its inland position, the wetland is dependent on the Tagus basin, along with one of its tributaries, the Almonda. As expected, the nature reserve is dominated by plant species associated with humid environments such as the lakeshore bulrush, the southern cattail or Juncus.

In the arboreal layer, in temporarily flooded areas, willow groves dominate, especially white willow, which form small islands of vegetation and even dense thickets.

== Fauna ==
Among the fish, the European eel and two Portuguese endemisms stand out: Achondrostoma oligolepis and the Iberian nase. Among the amphibians, there are four Iberian endemisms and 27 species of mammals are counted. Due to its status, the occurrence of the European pond turtle should also be mentioned.

The high ornithological value is attested by the presence of about 221 species of birds, especially herons, such as the western cattle egret, the little egret, the black-crowned night heron, the grey heron, the purple heron and the squacco heron. The Eurasian spoonbill has one of its few nesting sites in Portugal. It has a large wintering duck population, namely northern pintail and common pochard.

The symbol of the park is the white heron. The reserve is home to the largest number of white herons in the Iberian peninsula, and they are found there from February/March until the summer.
