= Santo André and Sancha Lagoons Natural Reserve =

Nature reserve in Portugal

Designations

Ramsar Wetland
- Official name: Lagoa de St. André et Lagoa de Sancha
- Designated: 8 May 1996
- Reference no.: 828

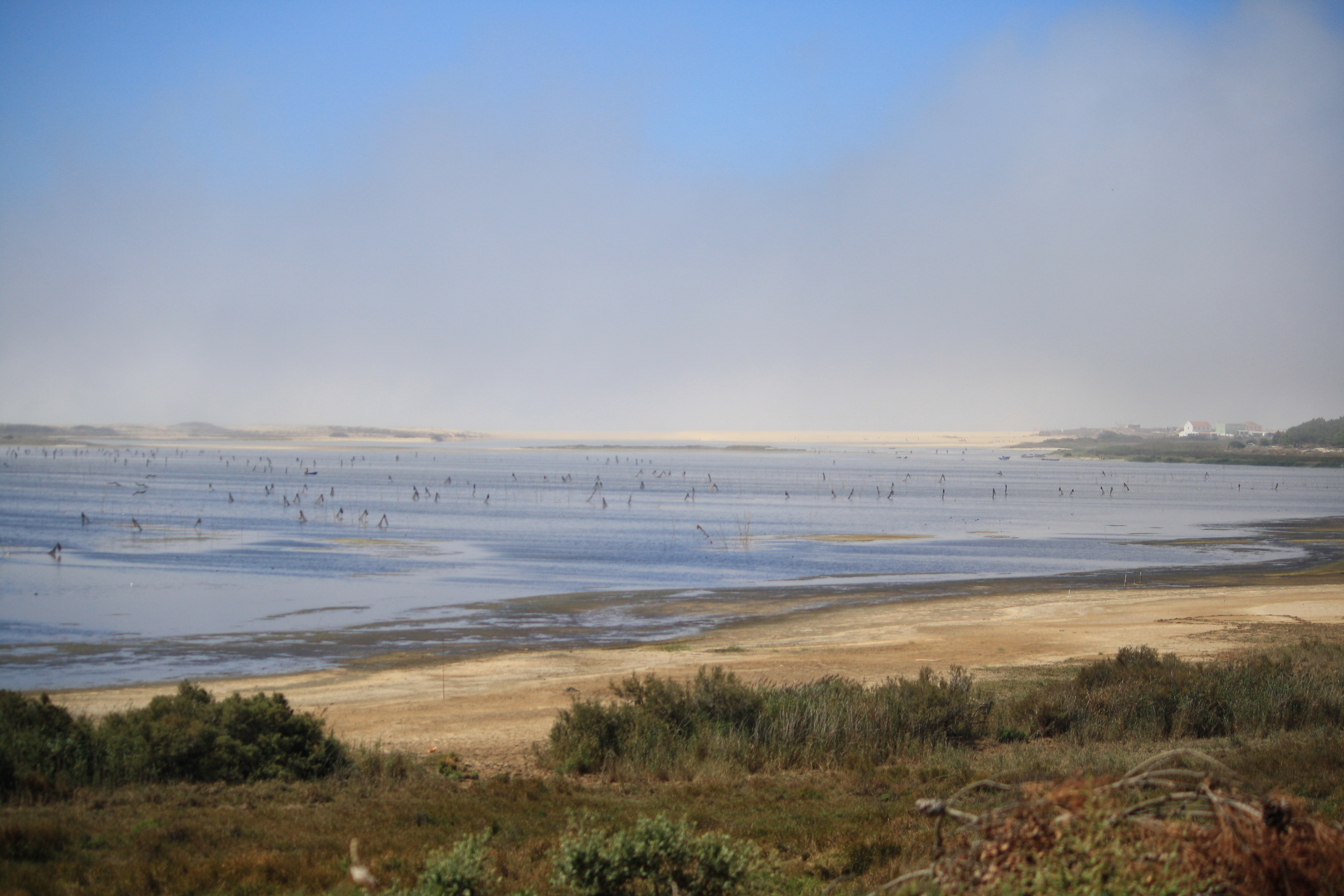

Santo André and Sancha Lagoons Natural Reserve is a natural reserve in Portugal. It is one of the 30 areas which are officially under protection in the country.

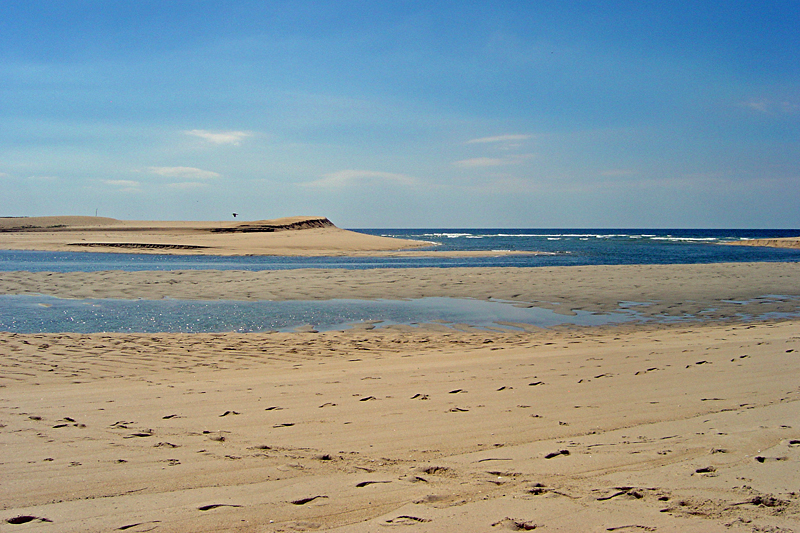

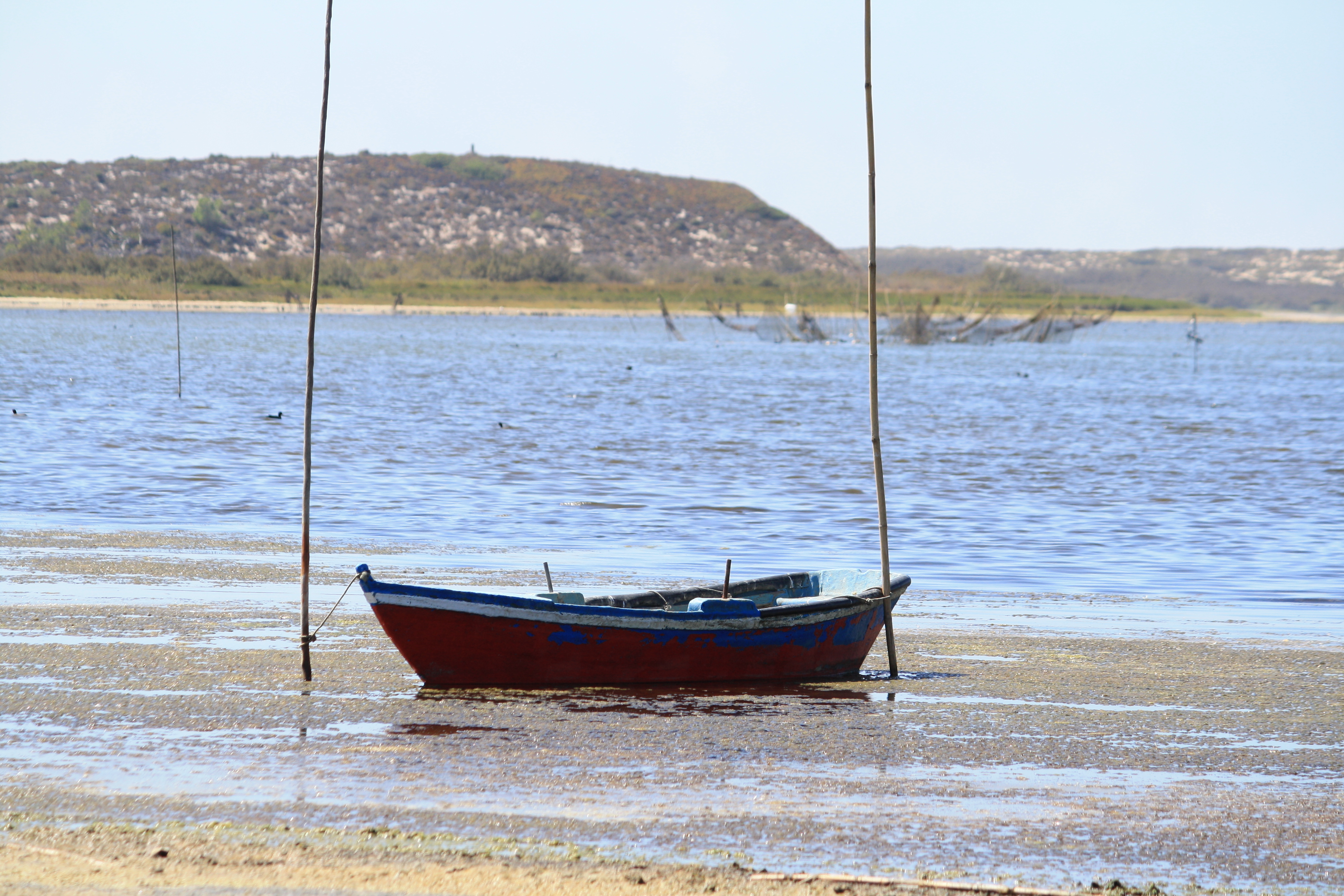

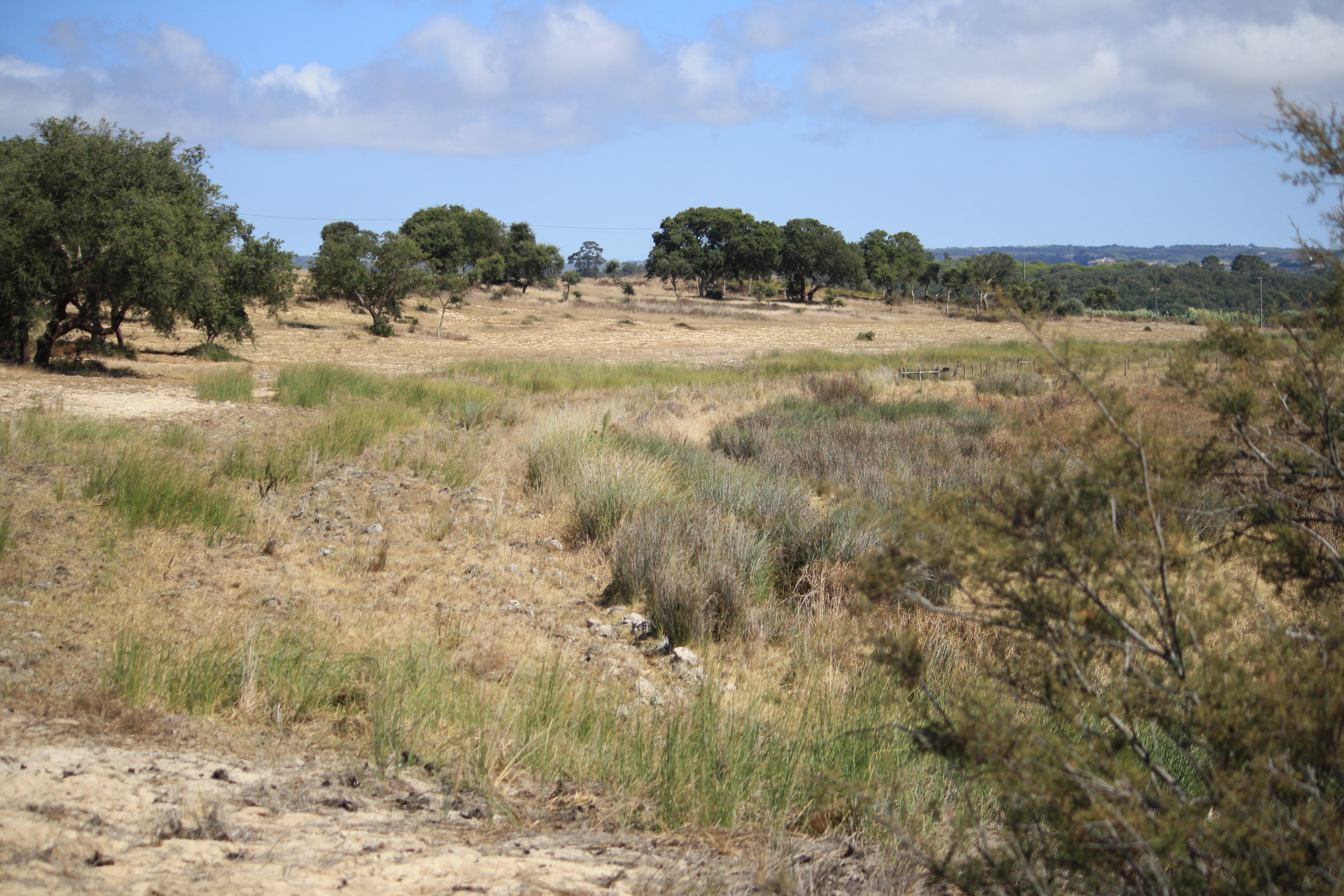
