= Paul de Arzila =

Paul de Arzila Nature Reserve
- IUCN category IV (habitat/species management area)
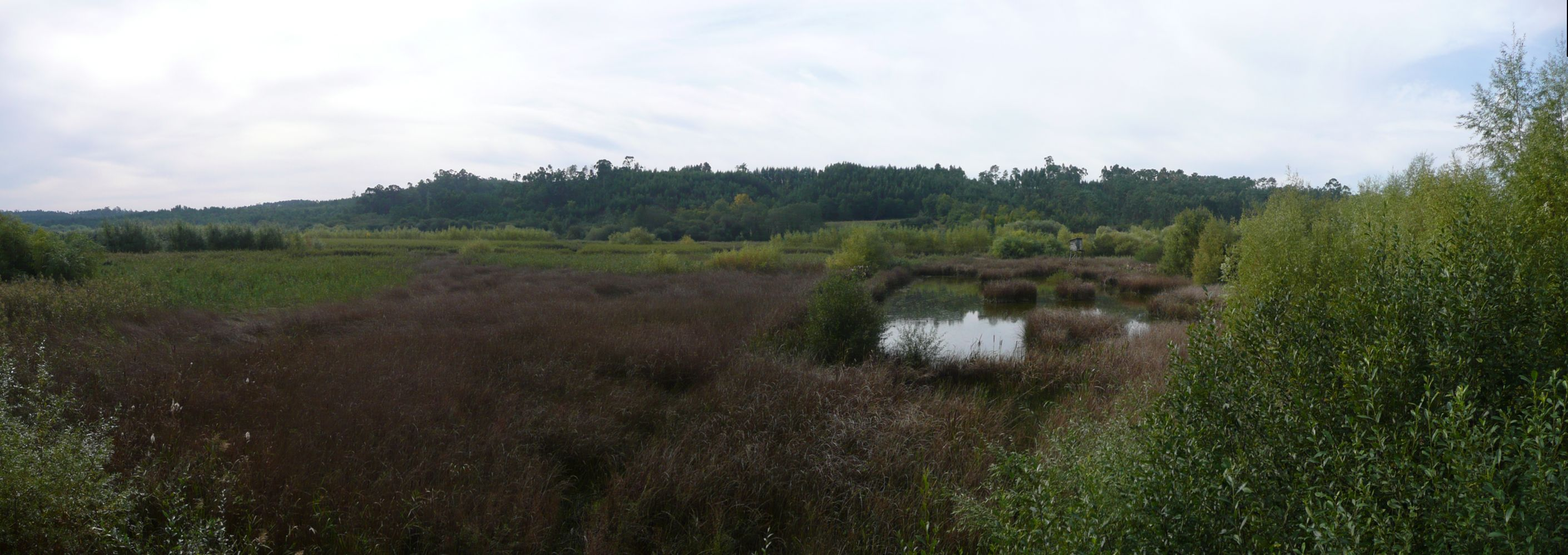
- Interactive map of Paul de Arzila Nature Reserve
- Location: Coimbra, Portugal
- Coordinates: 40°10′17″N 8°33′21″W
- Area: 5.87 km^{2} (2.27 sq mi)
- Established: 1988
- Governing body: ICNF

Ramsar Wetland
- Official name: Paúl de Arzila
- Designated: 8 May 1996
- Reference no.: 822

Paul de Arzila (Arzila Bog) is a Portuguese natural reserve occupying an area in Coimbra municipality (in Arzila), and neighbouring municipalities of Condeixa-a-Nova and Montemor-o-Velho. It is a biogenetical reserve with an area of 150 ha framed in a protected area of 535 ha, where 119 species of birds, 12 of mammals, 10 of reptiles, 13 of fish and 201 of spiders were inventoried.

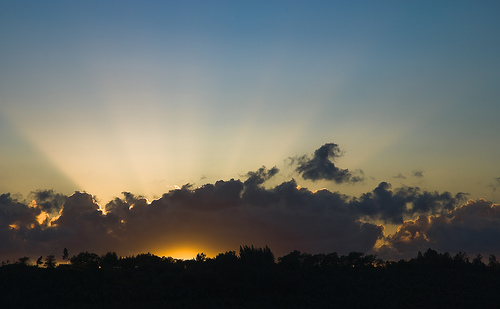
