= Portas de Ródão Natural Monument =

Protected area in Portugal

- IUCN category III (natural monument or feature)
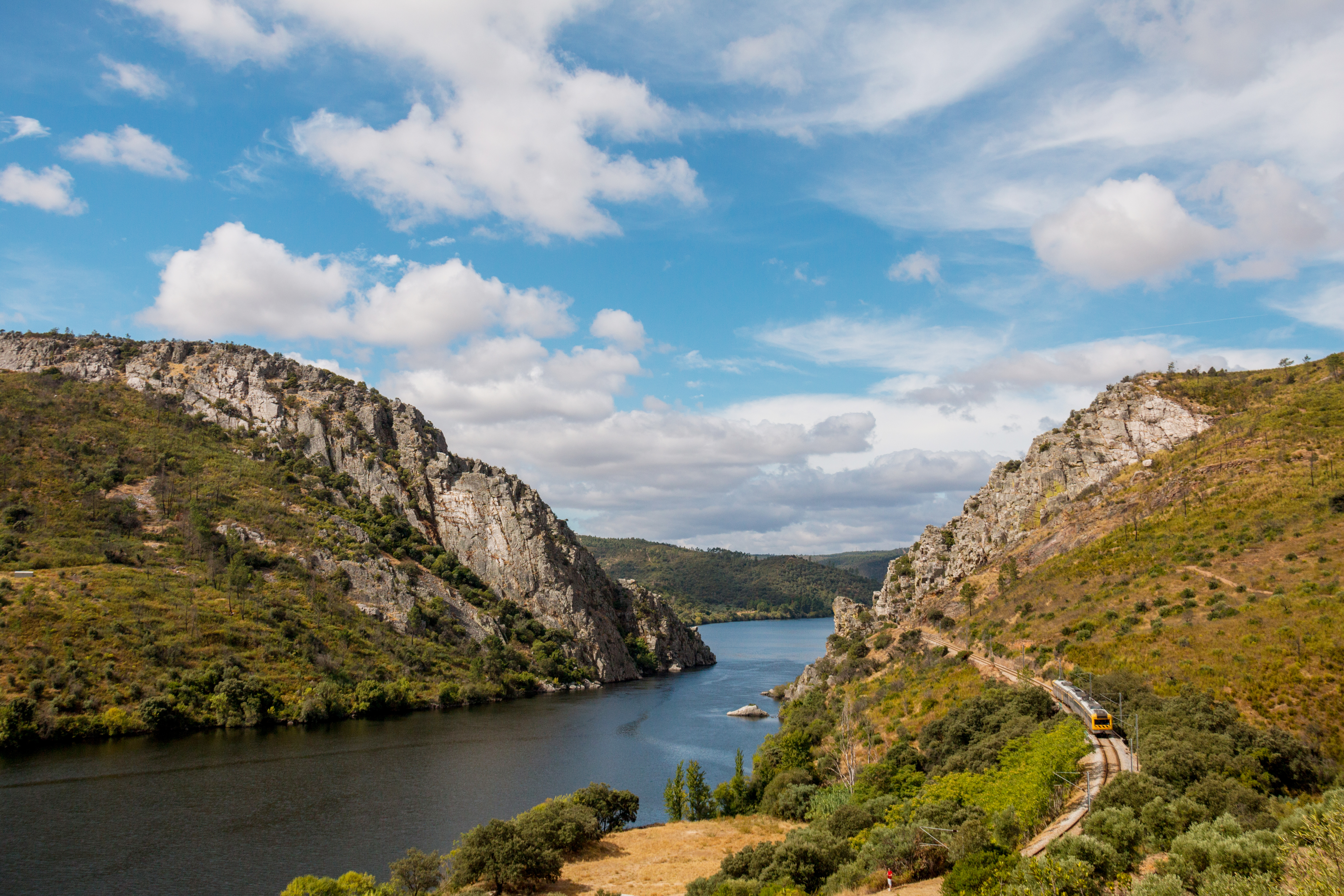
- View of the gorge and landscape

- Location within Portugal
- Location: Vila Velha de Ródão, Portugal
- Coordinates: 39°38′35″N 7°41′13″W
- Area: 965.38 ha (2,385.5 acres)
- Established: 2009

Portas de Ródão Natural Monument is centered on a geological formation crossed and formed by the Tagus near Vila Velha de Ródão, Central Portugal. Established in 2009, the monument preserves not only natural, but historical heritage, including the medieval Castle of Ródão which oversees the river.

The Natural Monument serves as habitat for the largest colony of griffon vultures in the national territory. The 170 m (560 ft) high cliffs make it an ideal place for nesting birds of prey.

Vegetation is primarily Mediterranean: Myrtus communis, Arbutus unedo, Pistacia lentiscus, Quercus coccifera and Juniperus oxycedrus (considered a relict species in Portugal) are common throughout the monument.
