= Faia Brava =

Natural reserve in northern Portugal

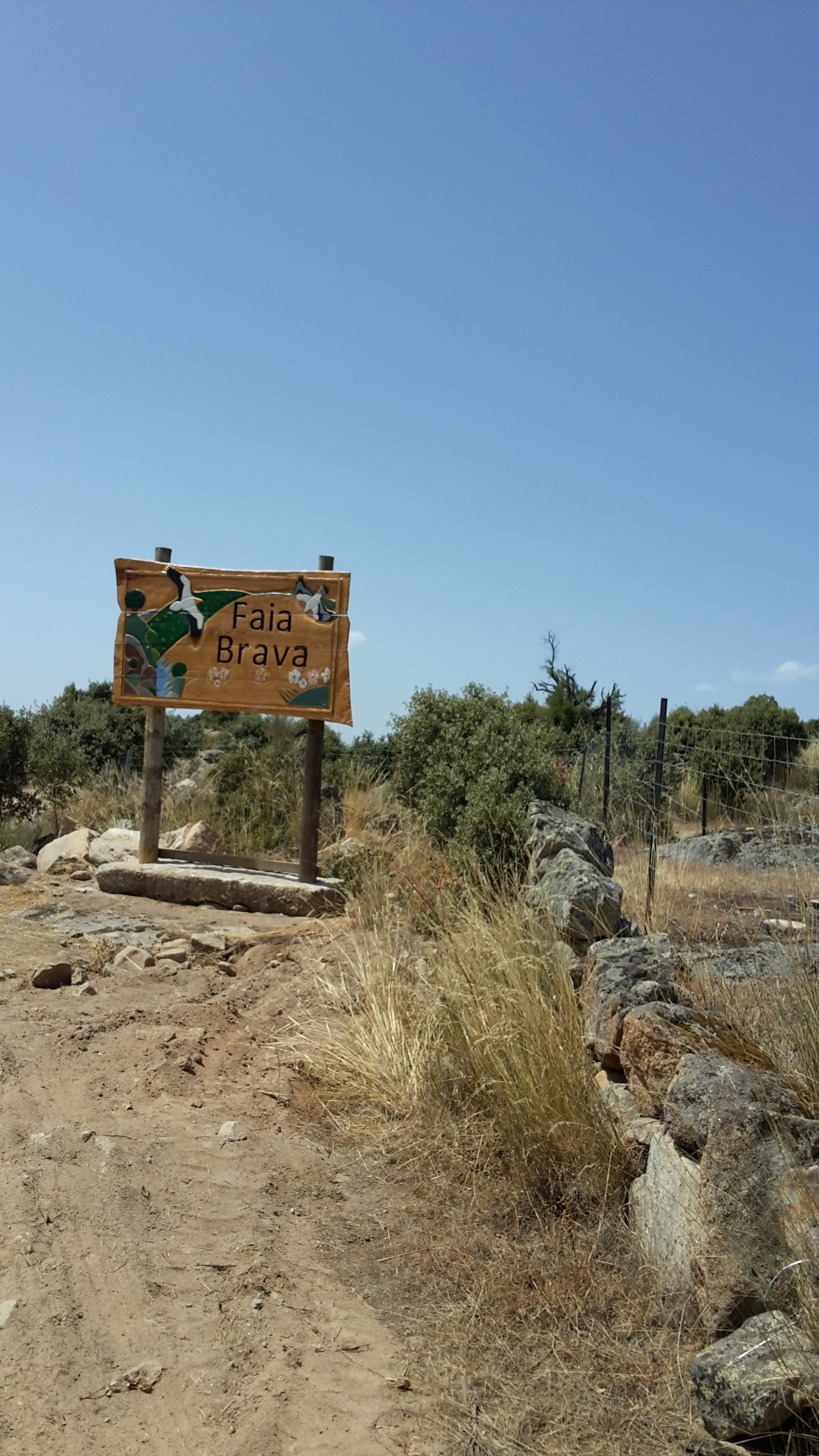
- Faia Brava main entry
- Interactive map of Faia Brava
- Location: Guarda District, Portugal
- Nearest city: Vila Nova de Foz Côa
- Coordinates: 40°52′28″N 7°10′13″W
- Area: 856.87 hectares (2,117.4 acres)
- Established: 2000

Faia Brava (Reserva da Faia Brava) is a natural reserve in northern Portugal. It is the first privately owned natural reserve in the country.

The reserve covers 856.87 hectares (2,117.4 acres). Bordered by the Côa River, it is part of the Archeological Park of the Côa Valley, a UNESCO world heritage site.

Given its strong biodiversity, Faia Brava reserve is identified as IBA (Birdlife's International Important Bird Area), and is also one of the Natura 2000 areas (network of nature protection areas in the territory of the European Union).

== Location ==
Faia Brava is in northern Portugal. It is located in the municipalities of Figueira de Castelo Rodrigo and Pinhel, Guarda district.

It is 40 km north of Guarda and 17 km to the southeast of Vila Nova de Foz Côa.

== History ==
Before becoming a natural reserve, Faia Brava was farmland.

In 2000, the reserve was established by ATN Association (Associação Transumância e Natureza ), and is, since then, owned and managed by this association.

== Natural components ==
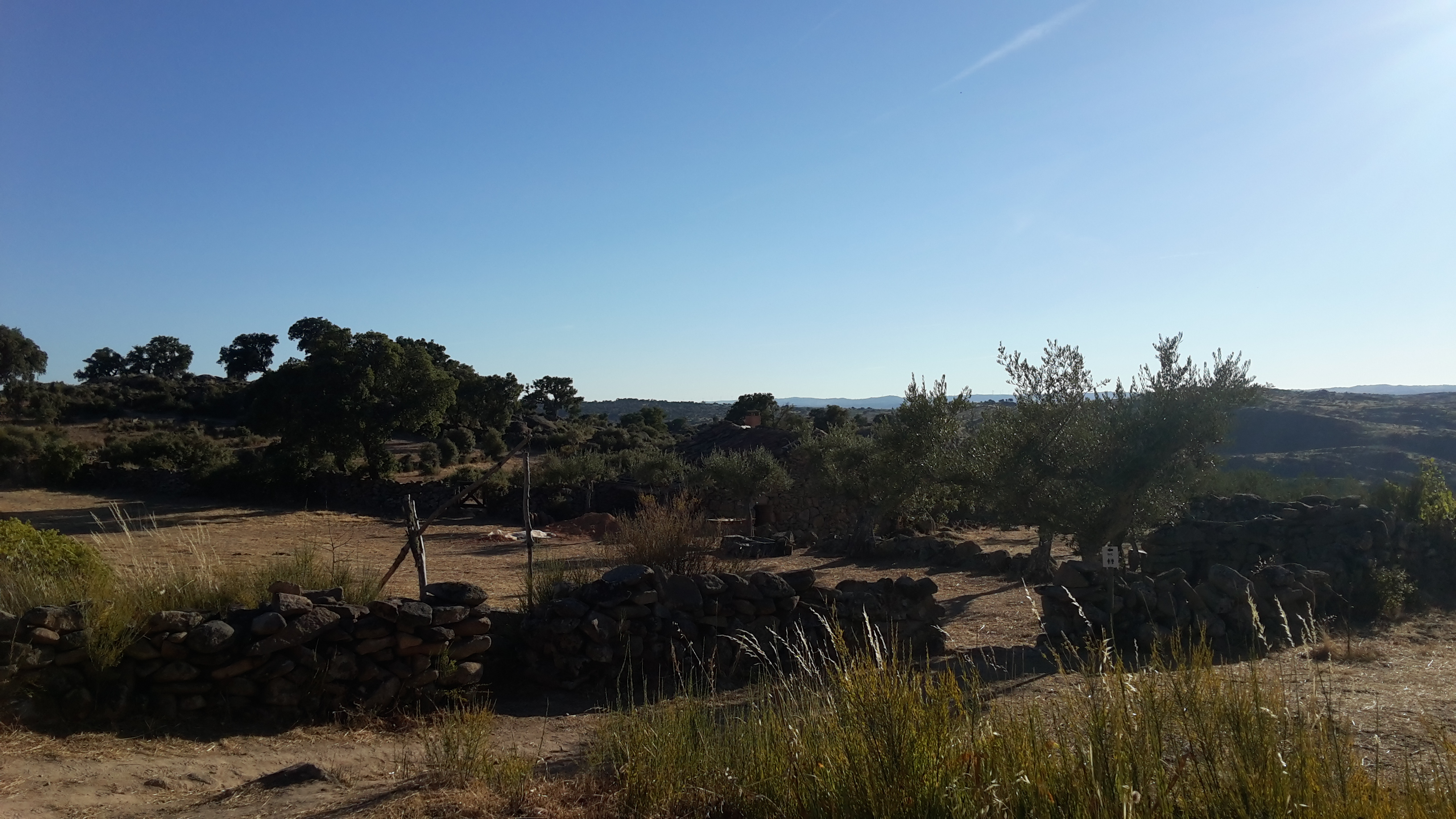
Faia Brava landscape

Faia Brava reserve is characterized by strong biodiversity and picturesque landscapes, formed by steep canyons, forests and plains.

=== Flora ===
Faia brava encompasses over 180 species of plants, including cork oak.

=== Fauna ===
The reserve is home to 25 mammal species including wild horses (Garrano) and cattle (Maronesa, Sayaguesa), it also hosts 100 birds species, including vultures (Gryphon, Egyptian), eagles (The Golden, Bonelli's), eagle owls and black storks.

== Tourism ==
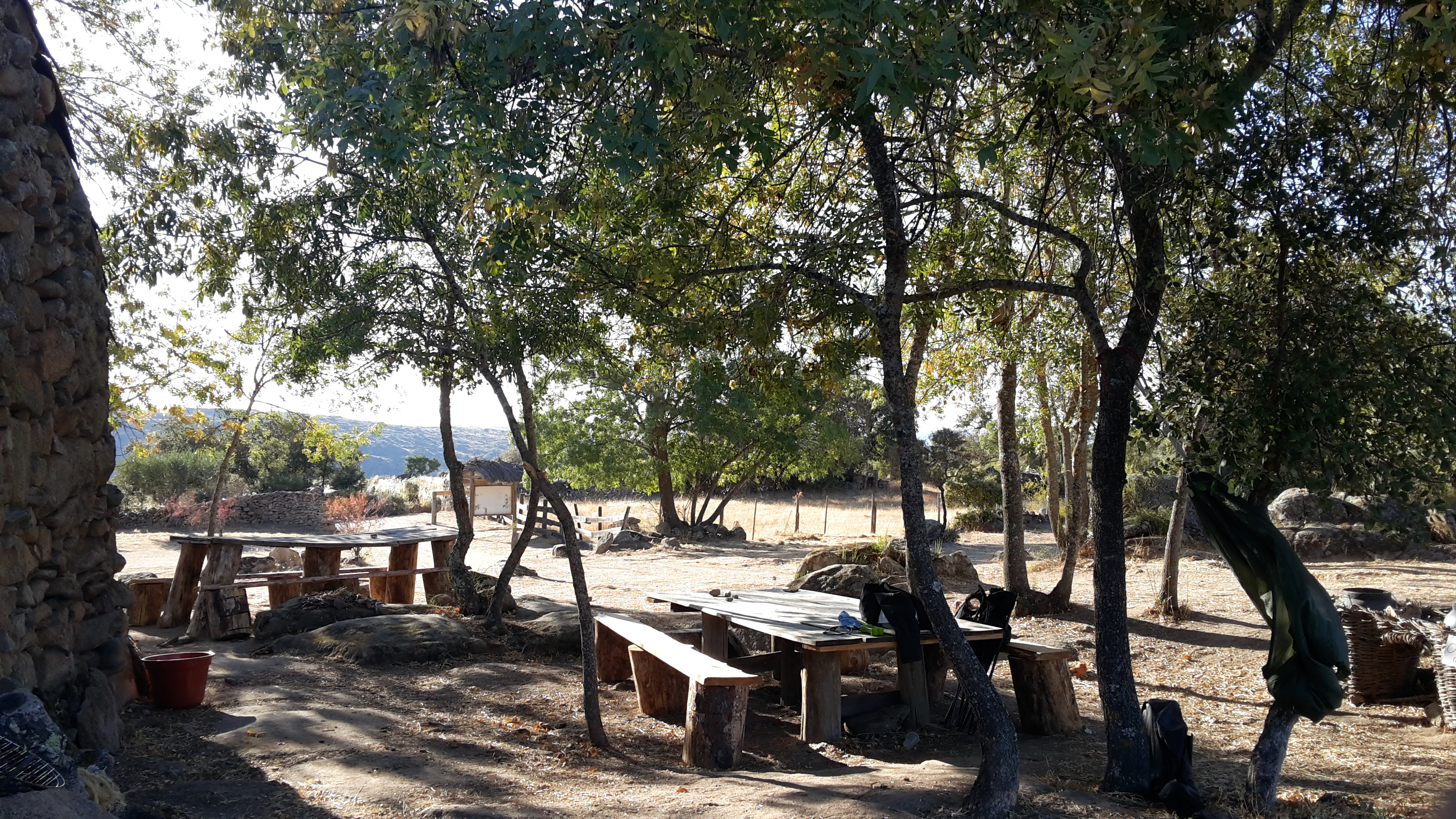
Touristic camp in Faia Brava

Besides being an attractive natural spot, Faia Brava is surrounded by different touristic attractions:

- Medieval villages, such as Algodres and Figueira de Castelo Rodrigo
- Côa River
- Museu do Côa
- Prehistoric Rock Art Sites in the Côa Valley

== Architecture ==
Besides its natural potential, Faia Brava hosts many traditional constructions, reflecting the vernacular architecture of the region.

These constructions are mainly dovecotes (pombais in Portuguese) and traditional houses destined to touristic visits. They are made of stone and clay, with roofs of wood and tiles.
