= Costa da Caparica Fossil Cliff Protected Landscape =

Protected landscape in Portugal

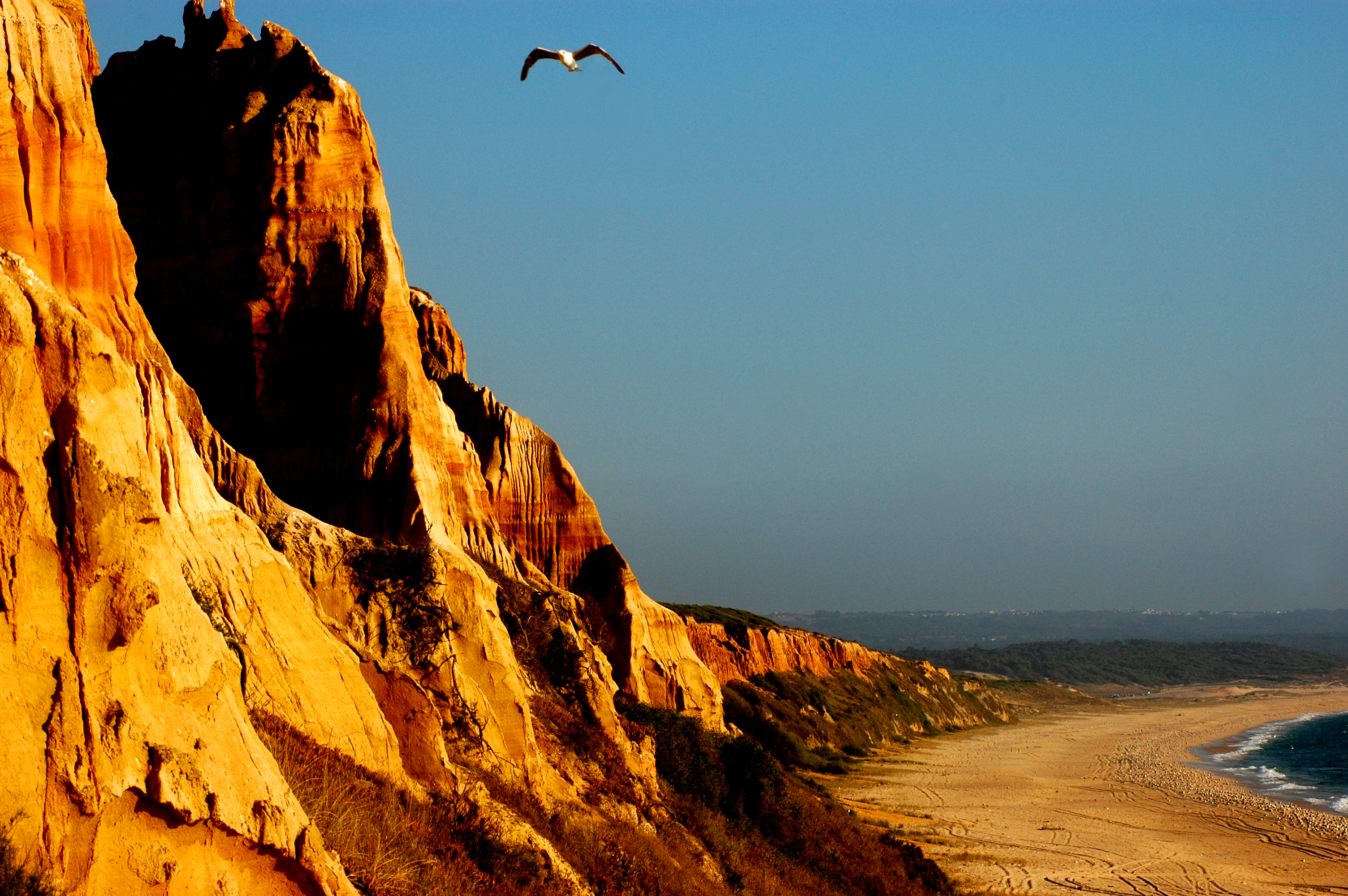

Costa da Caparica Fossil Cliff Protected Landscape is a protected landscape in Portugal. It is one of the 30 areas which are officially under protection in the country. It was created as a protected area in 1971 by decree of President Américo Tomás. A tourist train connects the beaches along the coast; the north end is family friendly, while Beach 19, at one end of Costa da Caparia, has been a naturist (nudist) area and a "gay beach".

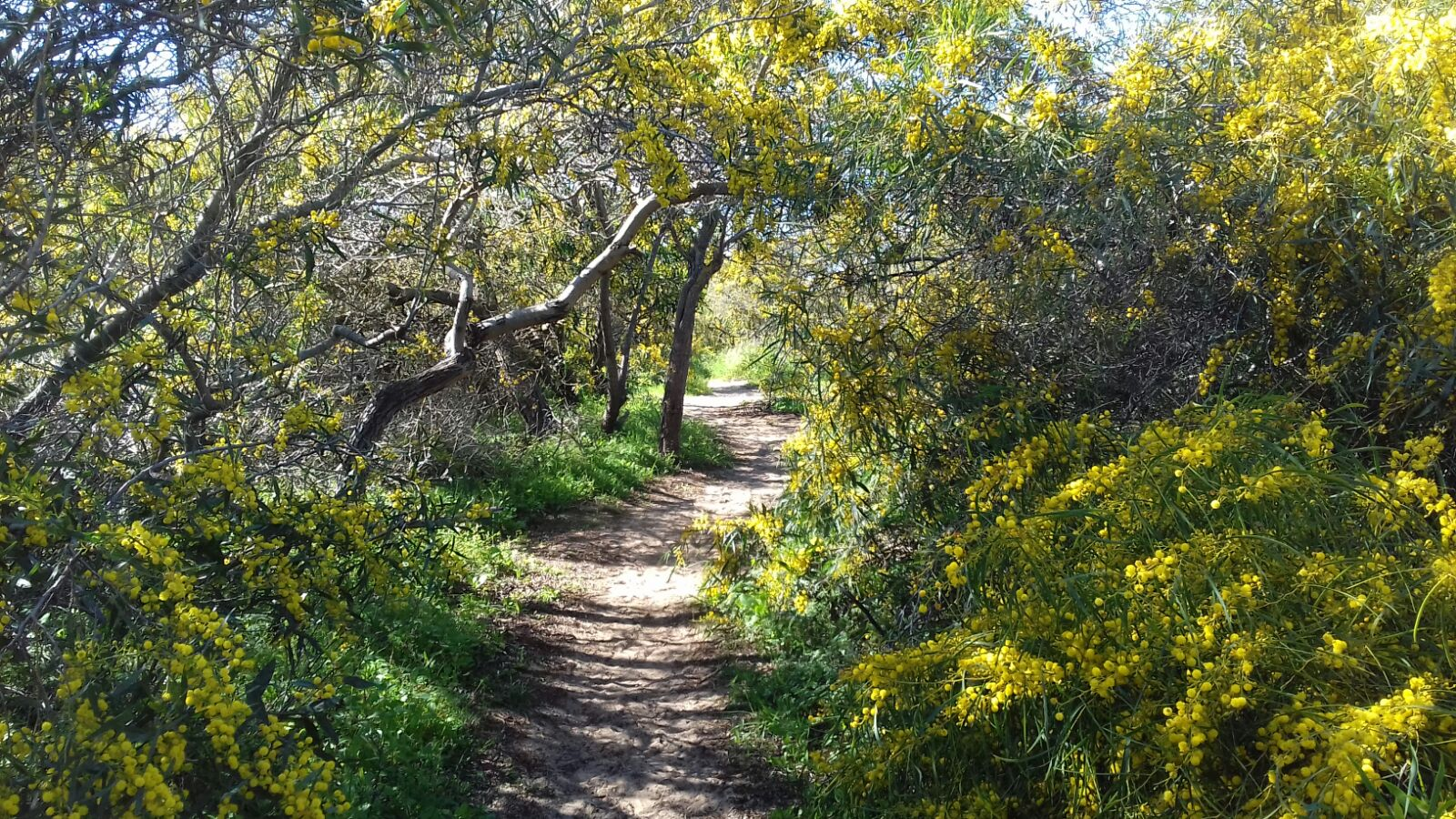
Invasive Acacia saligna

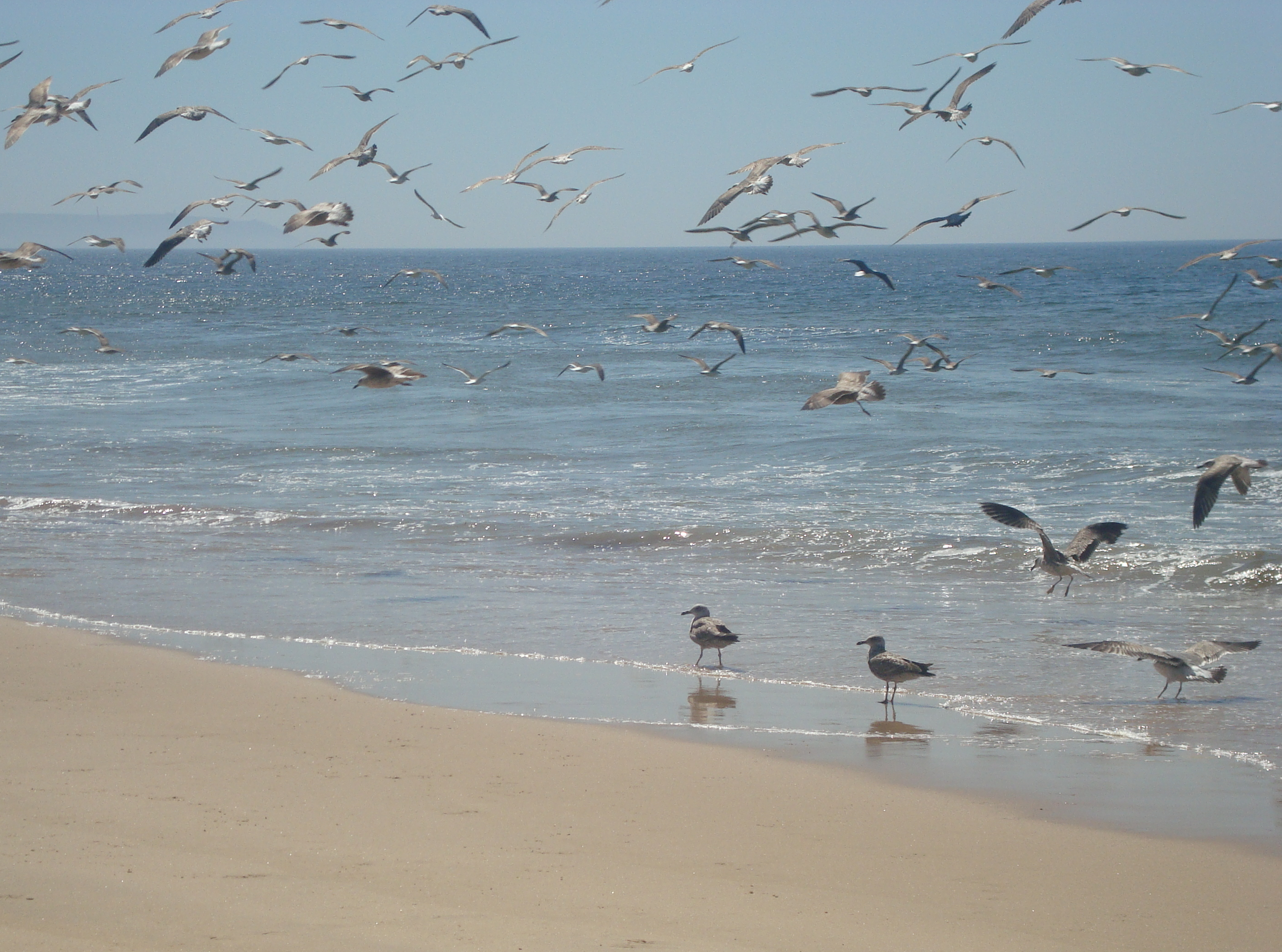

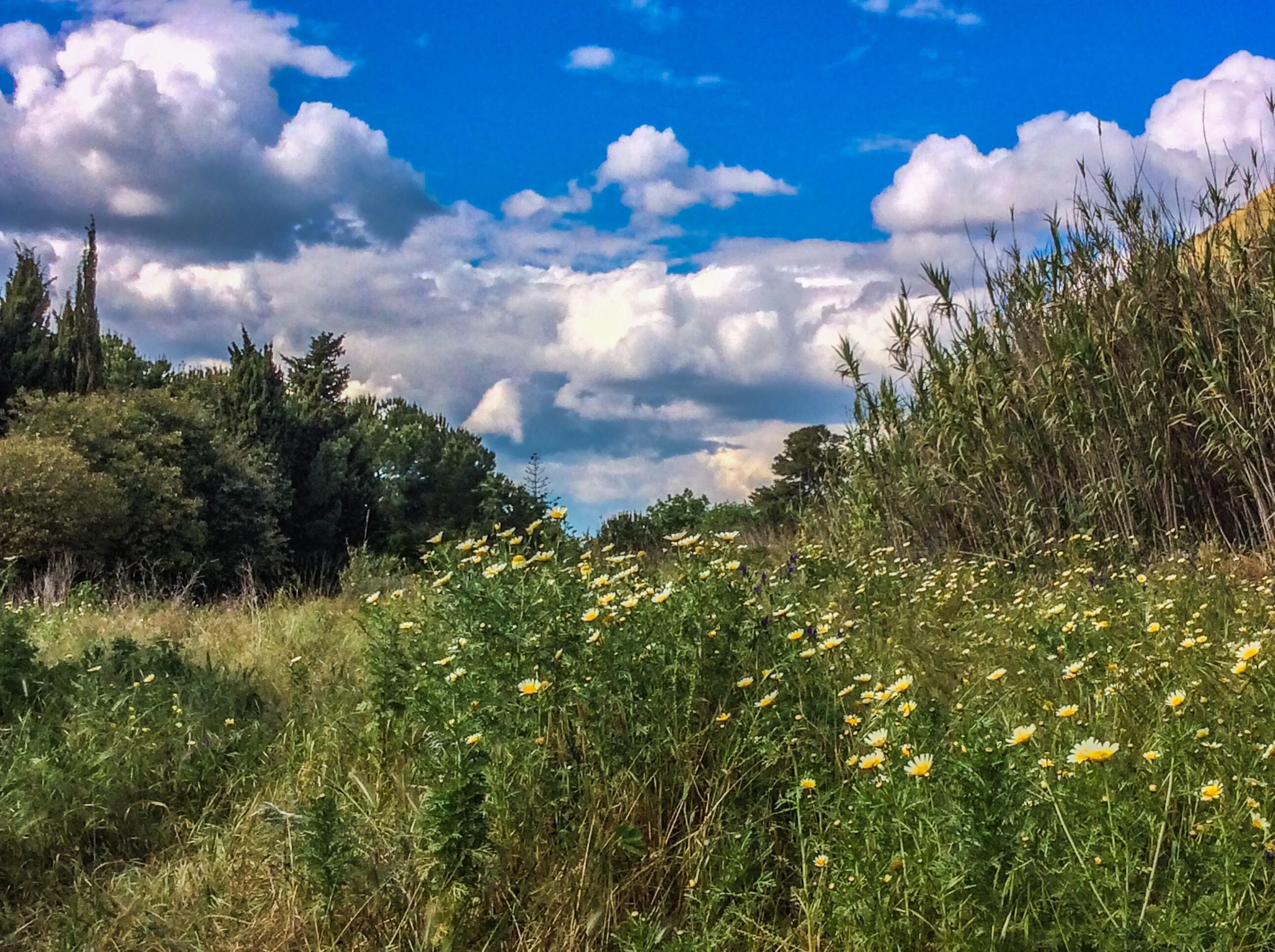

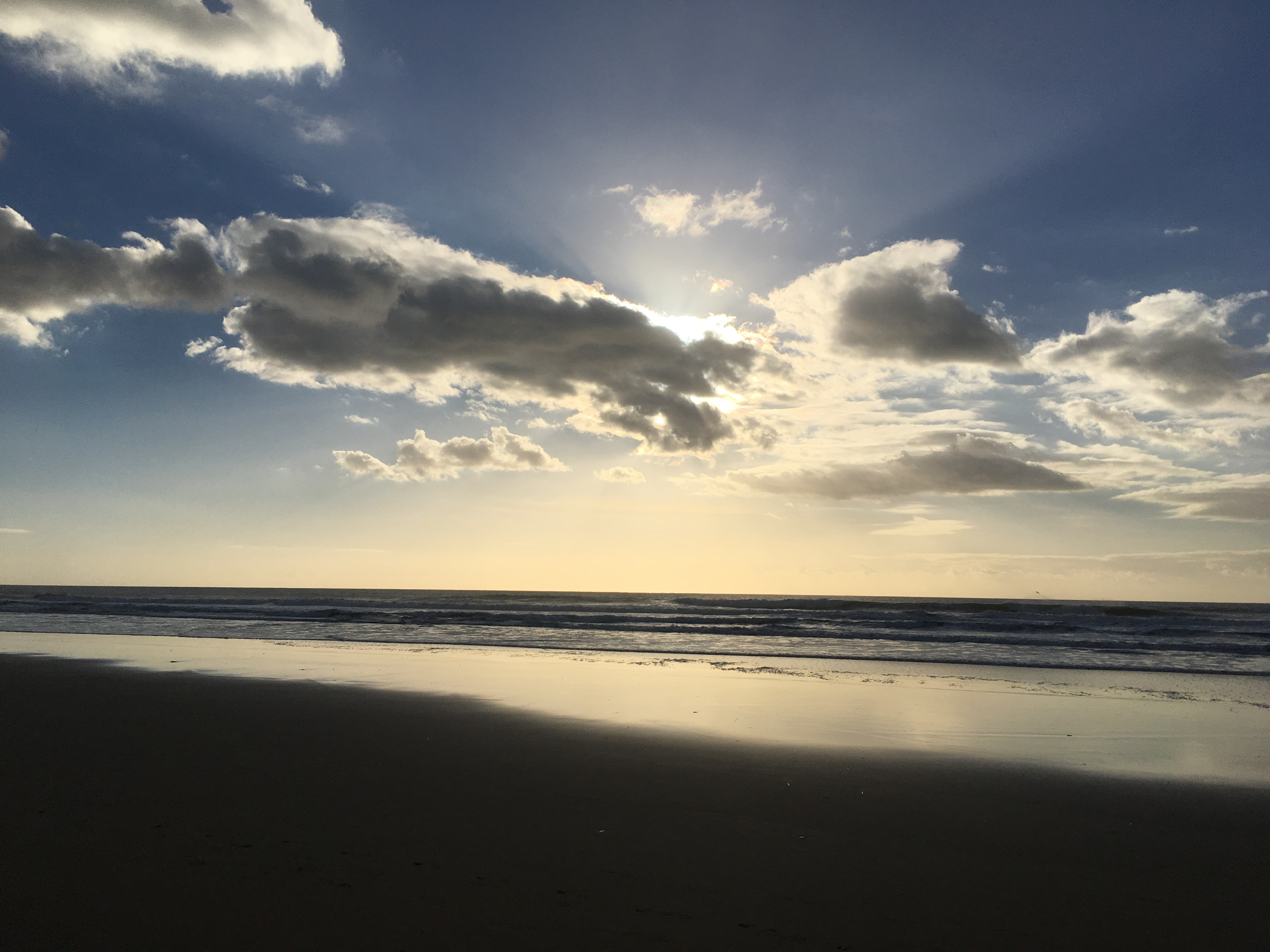

== See also ==
- 1971 in the environment
