= Pedreira do Avelino Natural Monument =

- IUCN category III (natural monument or feature)
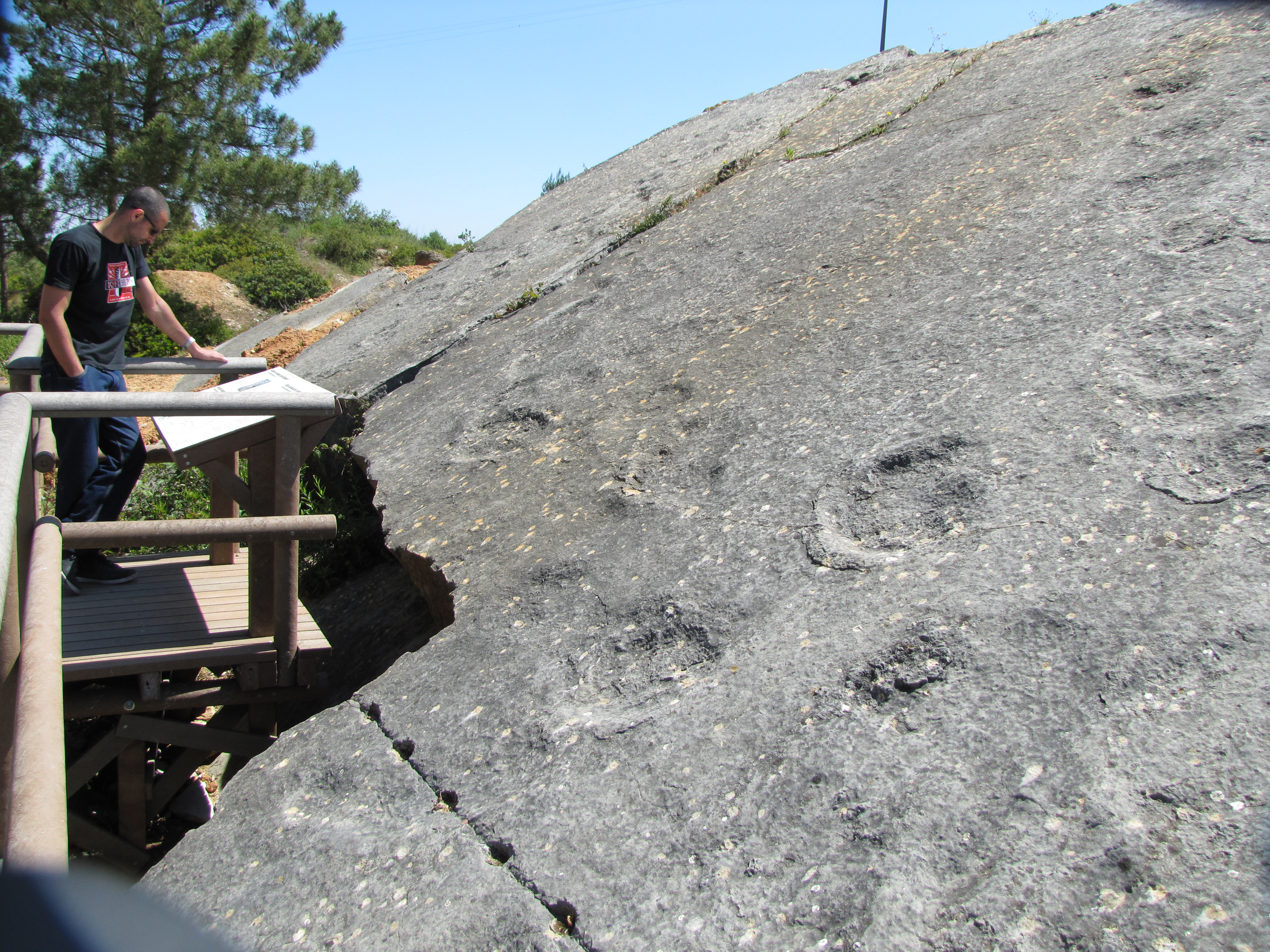

- Location within Portugal
- Location: Zambujal, Sesimbra
- Nearest city: Setúbal
- Coordinates: 38°27′16″N 9°07′22″W
- Area: 1.66 hectares (4.1 acres)
- Established: 1997

Pedreira do Avelino (Portuguese: Avelino's quarry) is a natural monument in Zambujal, Sesimbra, Portugal. The site contains an important set of dinosaur footprints from the Upper Jurassic (155 million years ago). The main slab is about 15 metres (49 ft) long by 10 metres (33 ft) wide, and is inclined (30°), which facilitates its observation and pedagogical use. It contains 5 tracks and 108 total footprints.

== Footprints ==
The footprints were created by Parabrontopodus, which differed in size: the largest with 4 metres (13 ft) from the ground to the hip, a footprint of ± 1 metre (3 ft 3 in) in length (visible with low light) and hands 30 cm long x 46 cm wide (12 in × 18 in); and the smallest, 1.2 metres (3 ft 11 in) from the ground to the hip, footprints 30 cm long x 25 cm wide (11.8 in × 9.8 in) and hands 18 cm x 13 cm (7.1 in × 5.1 in). There is also an incomplete track with predominance of handprints of sauropods from the upper Jurassic, the first of its kind in Portugal.

== Origin and discovery ==
The tracks are preserved on a surface that about 155 million years ago was the muddy bottom of the shore of a coastal lagoon, likely fresh water. The same geological processes that led to the lifting and tilting of the layers with these footprints were also responsible for raising Serra da Arrábida.

The discovery of the footprints occurred in the 1980s, while a compact limestone extraction took place.

== Visits ==
The deposit can be visited every day for free. A platform was installed on the site to observe the footprints and information panels for interpreting the site, which help to know the time in which they lived, curiosities and characteristics of the dinosaurs.
