= Bertiandos and São Pedro de Arcos Lagoons Protected Landscape =

Protected Landscape of Lagoas de Bertiandos e São Pedro de Arcos
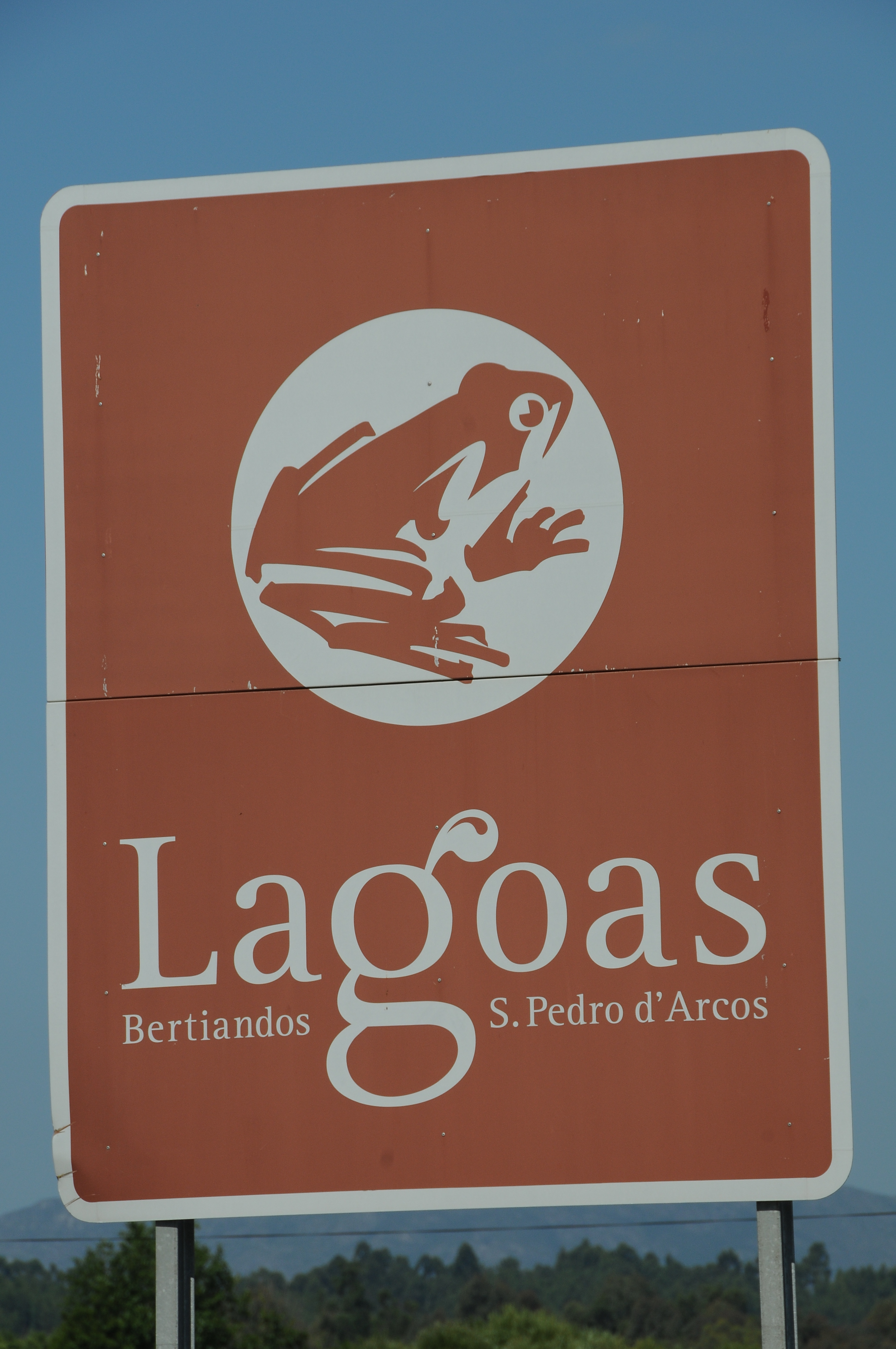
- Interactive map of Protected Landscape of Lagoas de Bertiandos e São Pedro de Arcos
- Location: Viana do Castelo, Alto Minho, Norte, Portugal
- Coordinates: 41°45′52.6″N 8°38′13.6″W
- Established: Decree Law 19/2000
- Named for: Lagoon of Bertiandos and Lagoon of São Pedro de Arcos
- Operator: Centro de Interpretação Ambiental
- Website: Paisagem Protegida das Lagoas de Bertiandos e São Pedro de Arcos

The Protected Landscape of Lagoas de Bertiandos e São Pedro de Arcos (Portuguese: Paisagem Protegida das Lagoas de Bertiandos e São Pedro de Arcos) is a protected landscape situated in the municipality of Ponte de Lima, in the district of Viana do Castelo in Portugal.

== History ==
The area was classified as a protected landscape on 11 December 2000, by regulatory decree 19/2000, with its natural value justifying its attributions, such as:

- Área Protegida de Âmbito Regional (Regional Protected Environment Area)
- Sítio de Importância Comunitária (Site of Communitarian Importance)
- Site 1613, listed on the Ramsar Convention.

== Geography ==
The protected zone includes an area of 346 hectares (3.46 km^{2}) situated in the municipality of Ponte de Lima, accessible directly by the Estrada Nacional E.N.202 and the Auto-estrada A27. Bertiandos and São Pedro de Arcos is an important space for the conservation of nature and biodiversity, resulting in the presence of a diverse biotope associated with a humid continental zone, that includes habitats and priority species conservation.

Its wetlands are divided between the Bertiandos, São Pedro de Arcos, Estorãos, Moreira do Lima, Sá and Fontão parishes of Ponte de Lima, northern Portugal.

There is an elevated number of flora species registered (508) that include rare and threatened Iberian endemics. These plants include hygrophilous forests, natural pastures and lagoon systems that are relevant for the natural conservation and biodiversity. Although the area is small, it has a large diversity of vertebrates; 9 species of freshwater and migratory fish, 13 species of amphibians, 11 types of reptiles, 41 species of mammals and 144 migratory or nesting bird species occupy that wetlands at any time. Of these, 25 species of terrestrial and freshwater vertebrates are classified as priority of conservation and associated with humid zones.

The landscape's intrinsic value is a point of departure for the dynamic investment in the area, that permitted the installation of a group of physical resources distributed between two poles: the Protected Landscape and Quinta de Pentieiros. These resources include: Environmental Interpretative Centre; network of pedestrian trails; shelters; bungalows; campsite; and pedagogical farm. These physical resources and work developed in the Protected Landscape allow:

- recognition, management and conservation efforts associated with nature and biodiversity;
- agricultural development; and
- awareness and environmental education.
