= Serra do Açor Protected Landscape =

Protected area in Portugal

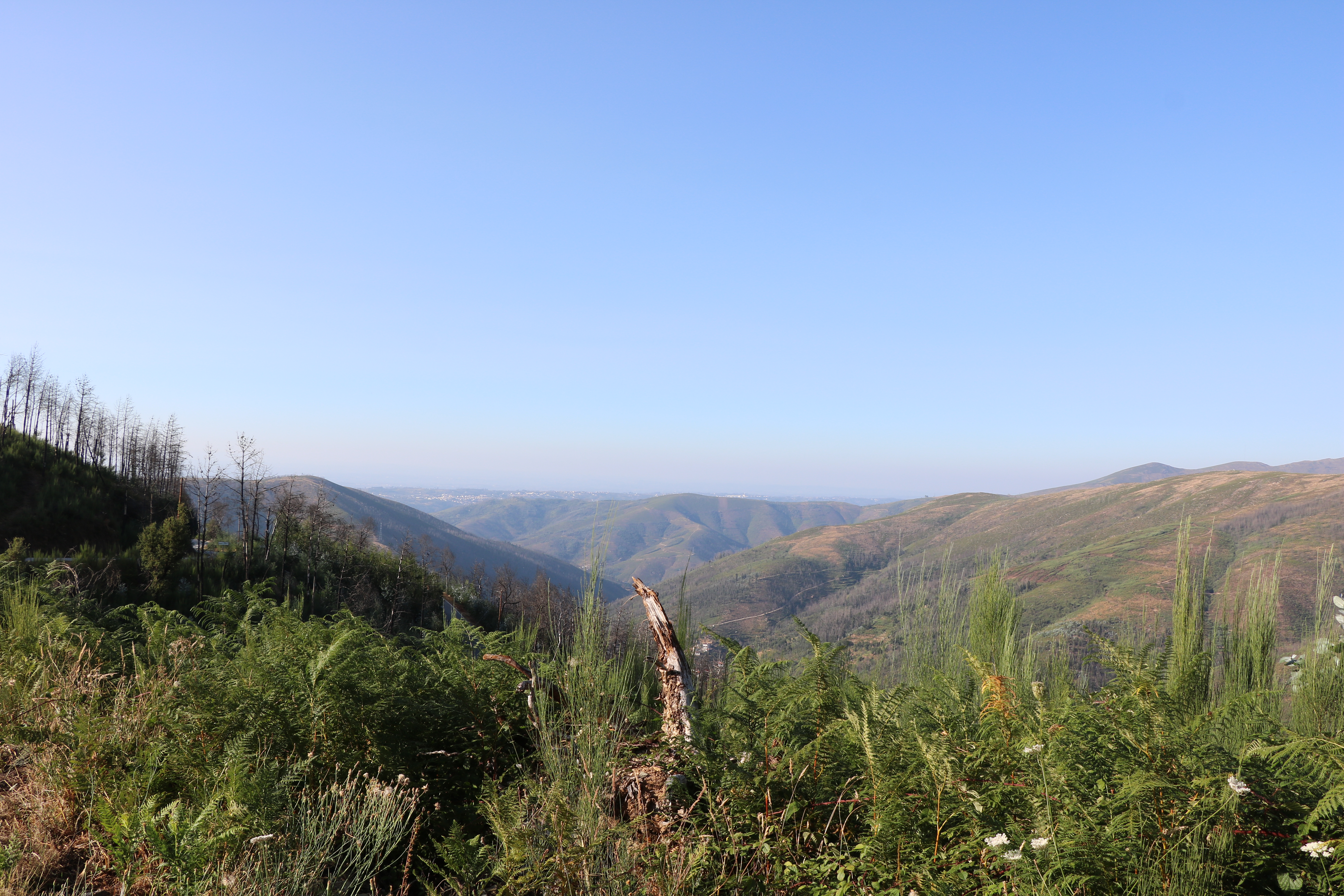

Serra do Açor Protected Landscape is a protected landscape in the Centro Region, Portugal. It is one of the 30 areas which are officially under protection in the country.

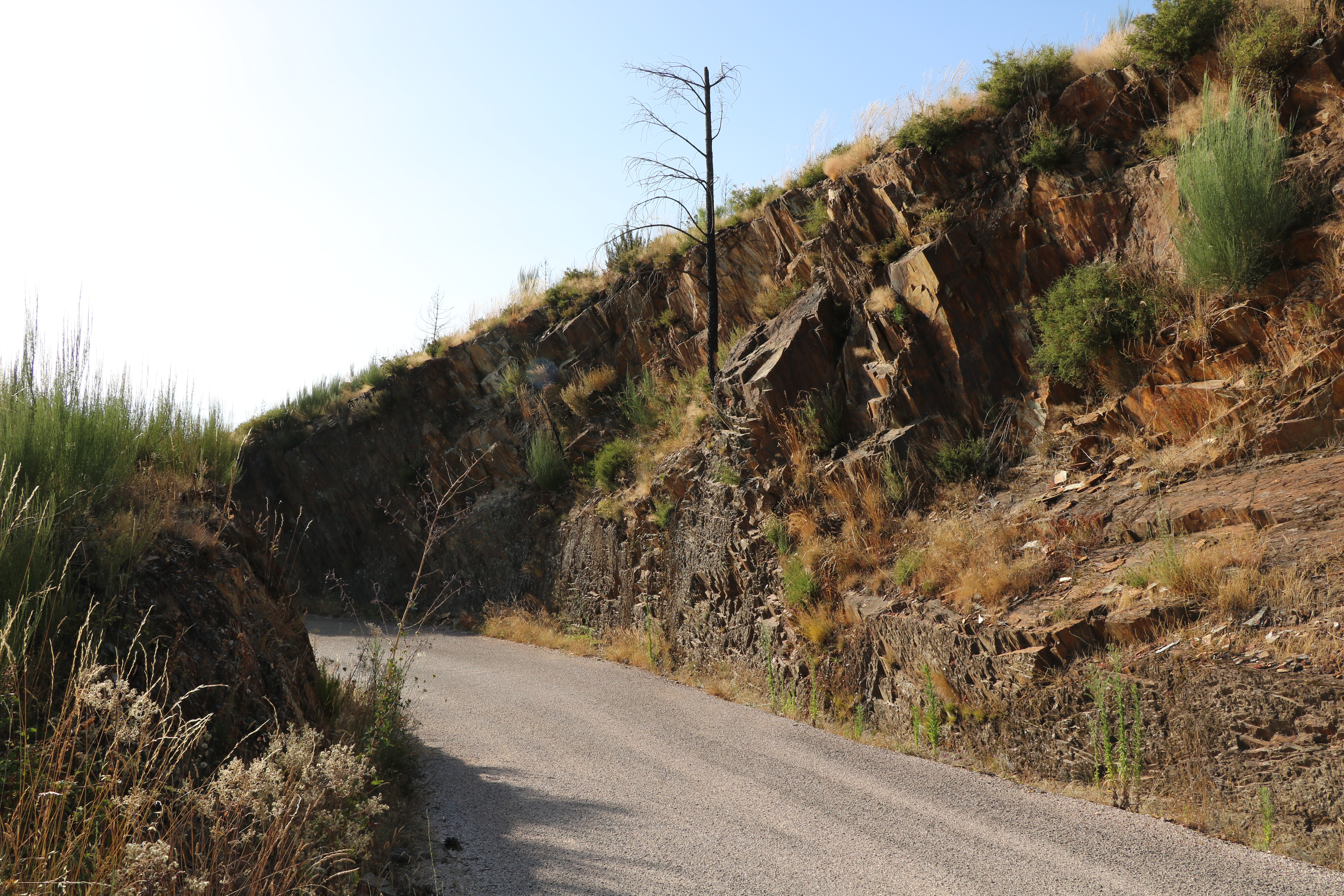

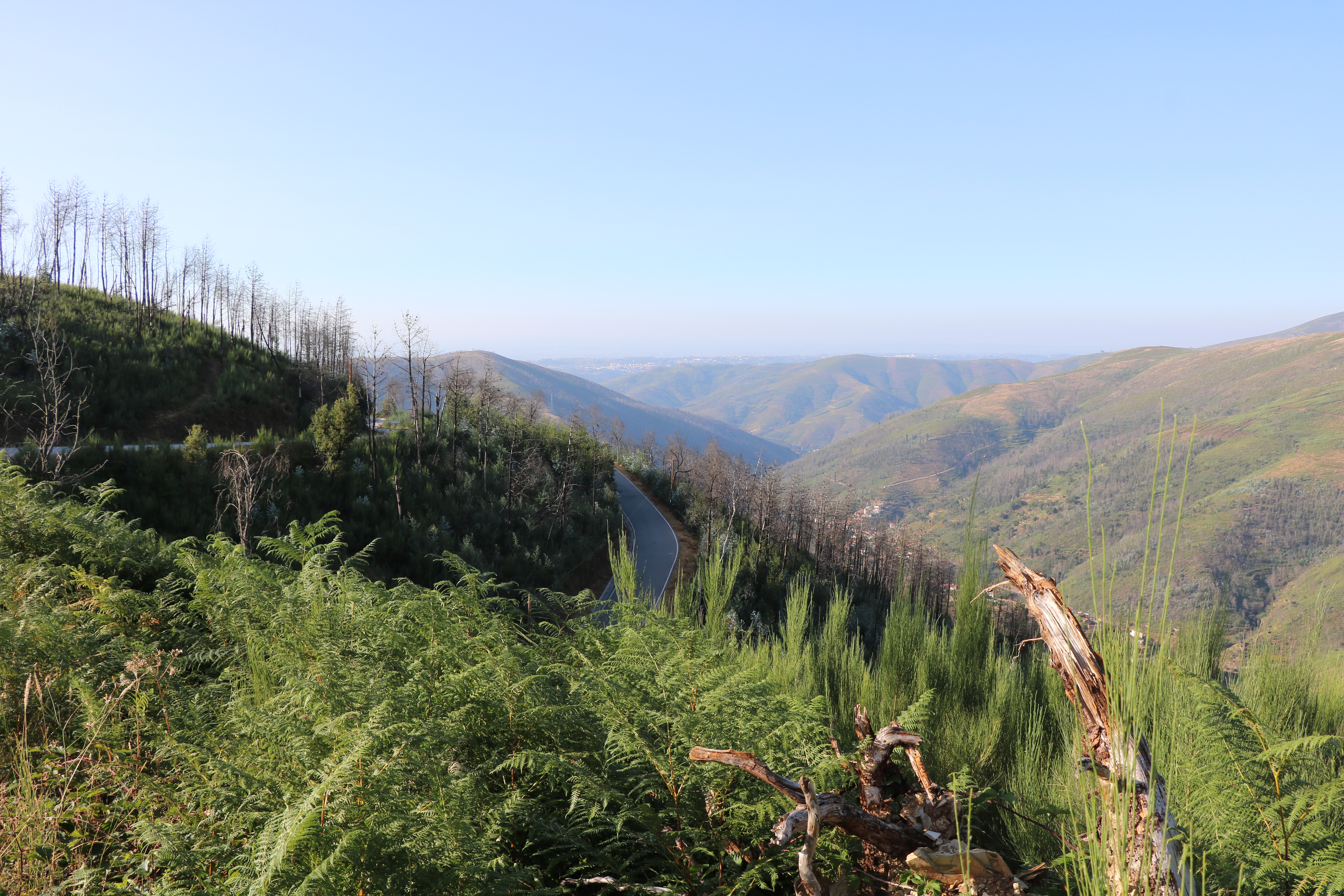

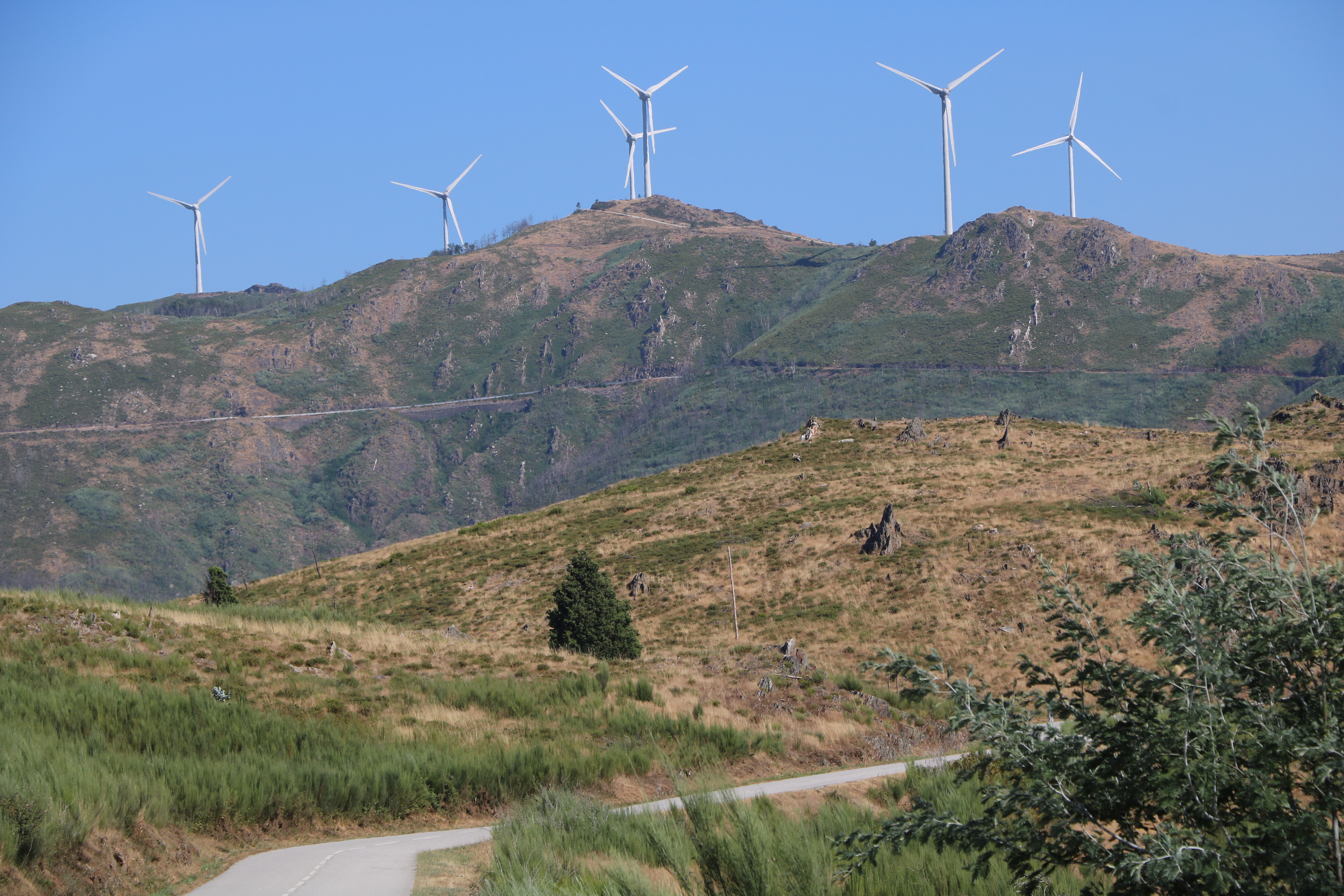
