= São Jacinto Dunes Natural Reserve =

Nature reserve in Aveiro, Portugal

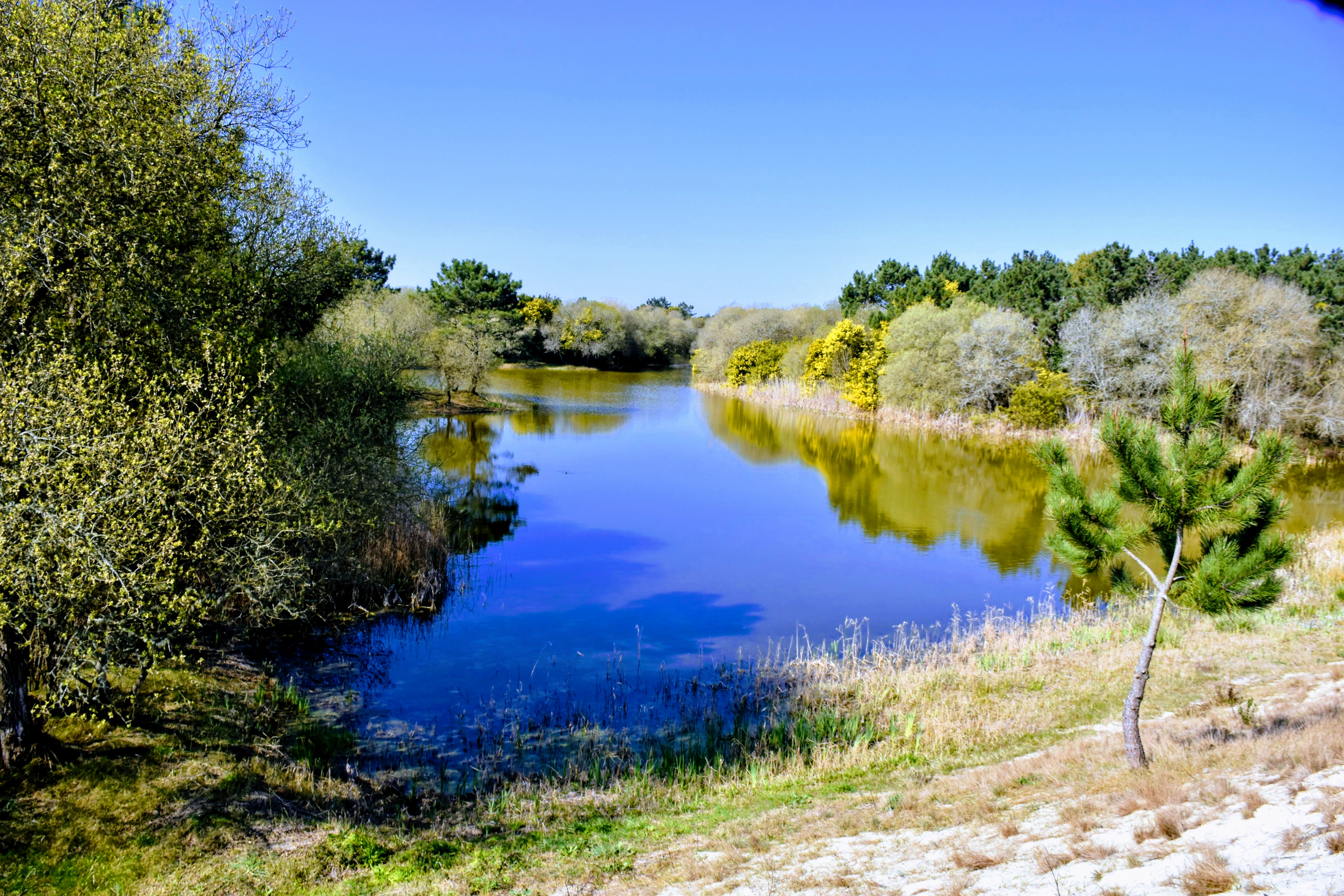

São Jacinto Dunes Natural Reserve is a natural reserve, in Aveiro, Portugal in central Portugal. It is one of the 30 areas which are officially under protection in the country.

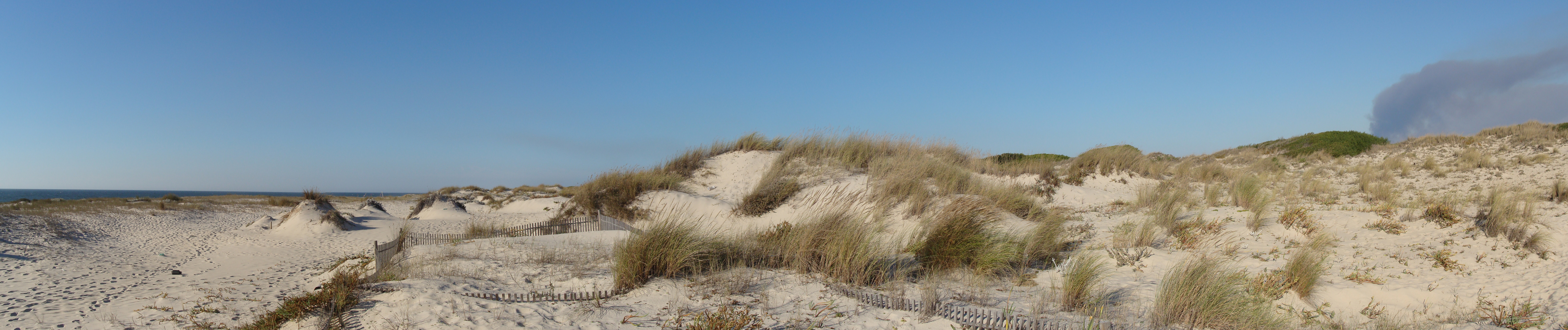

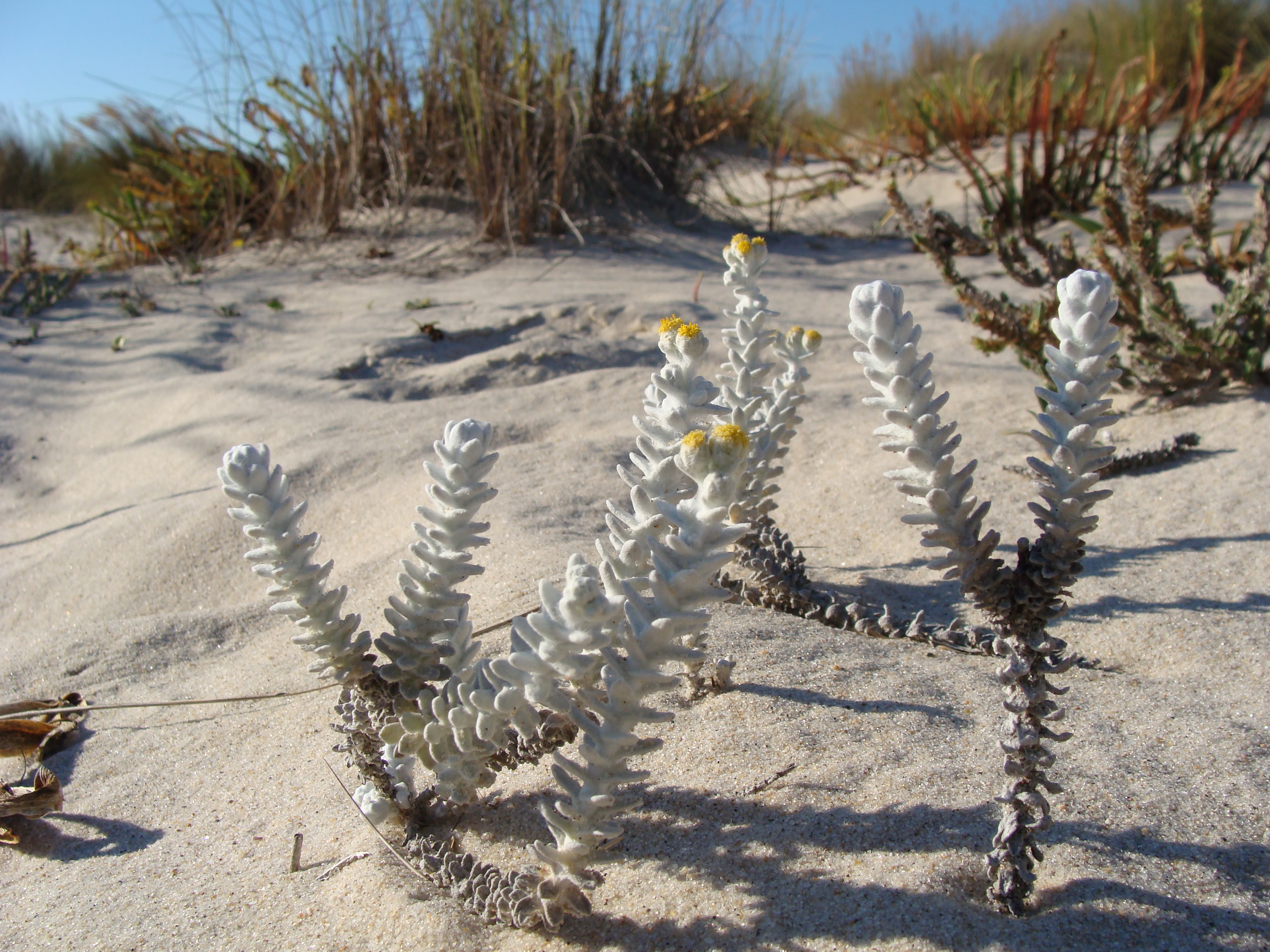

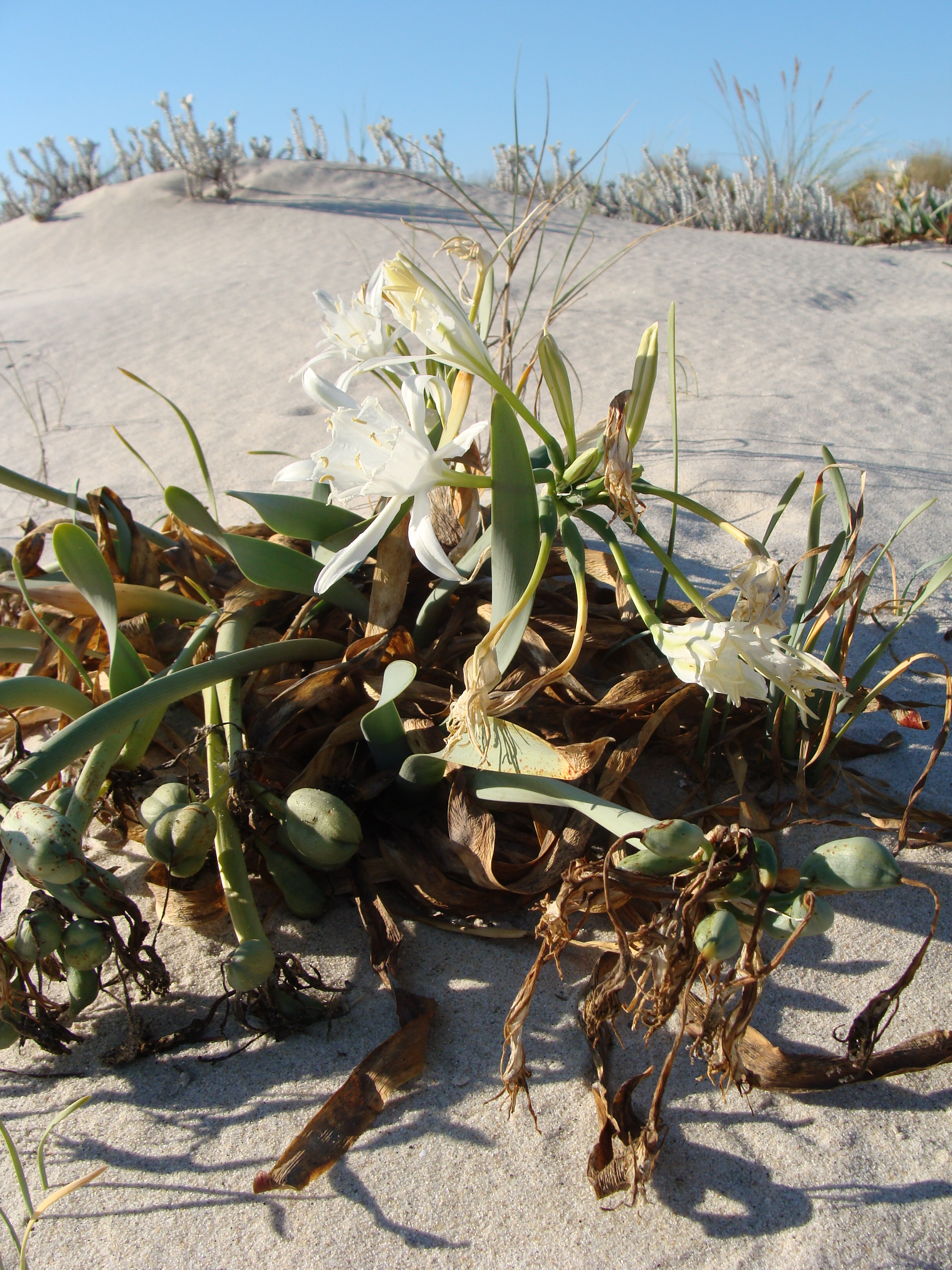

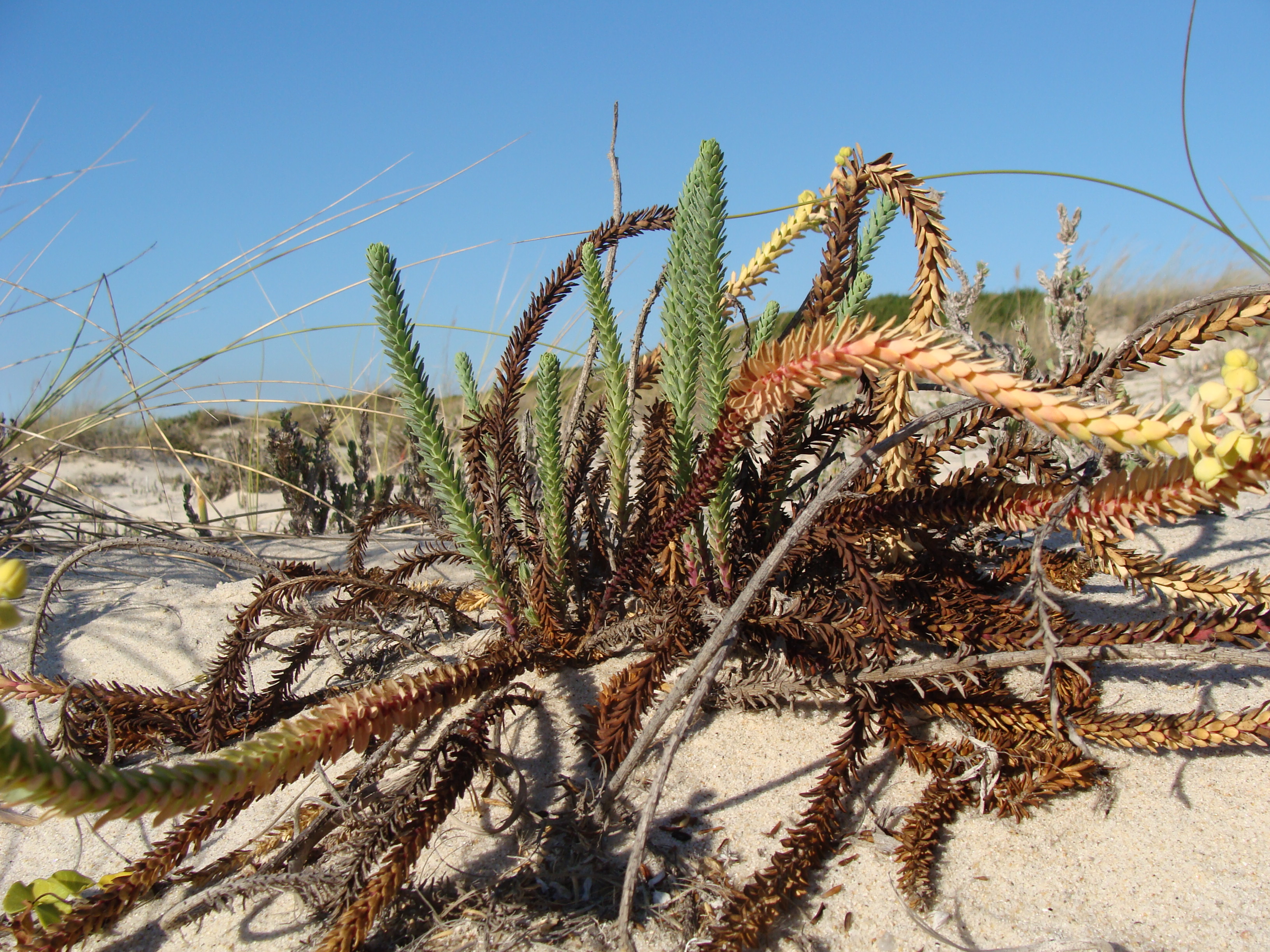
