= Comporta =

Comporta Costa da Comporta
- Region of the Alentejo Coast
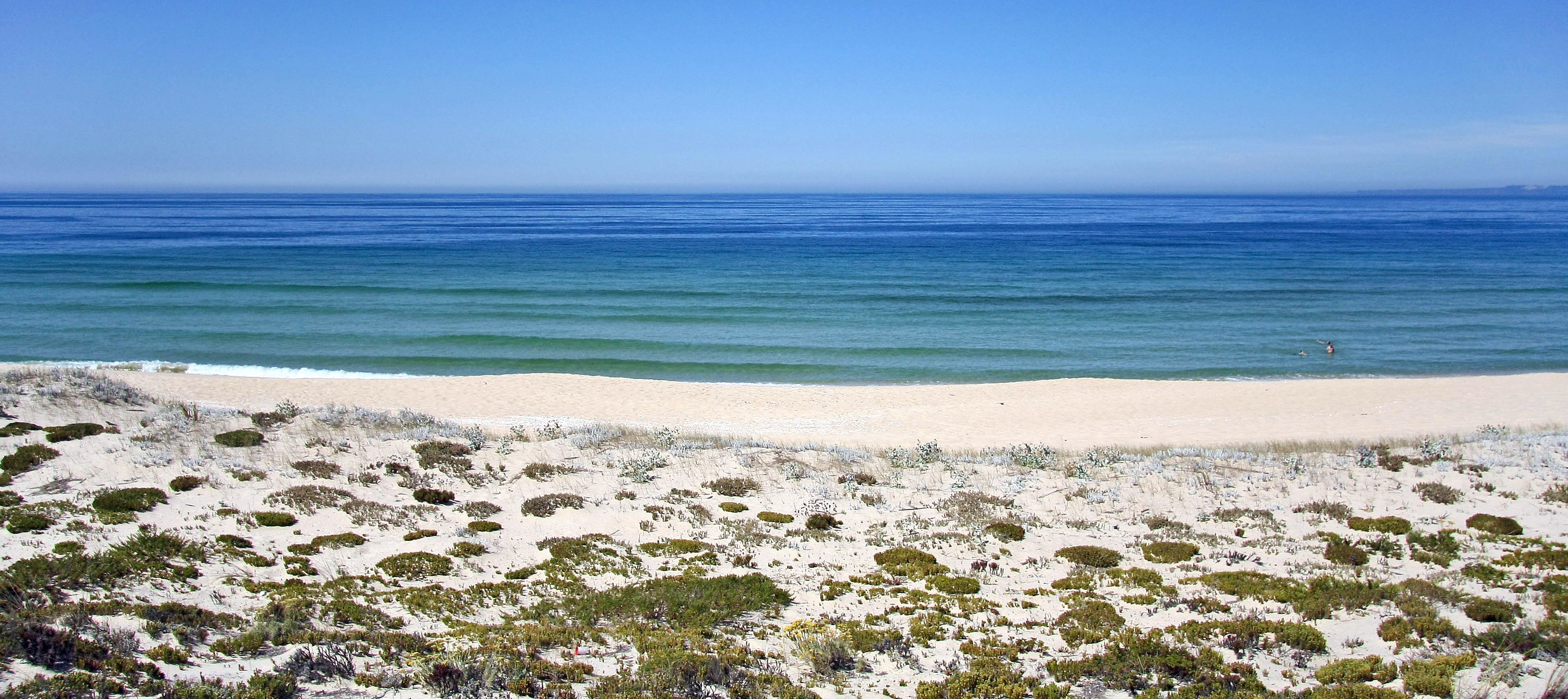
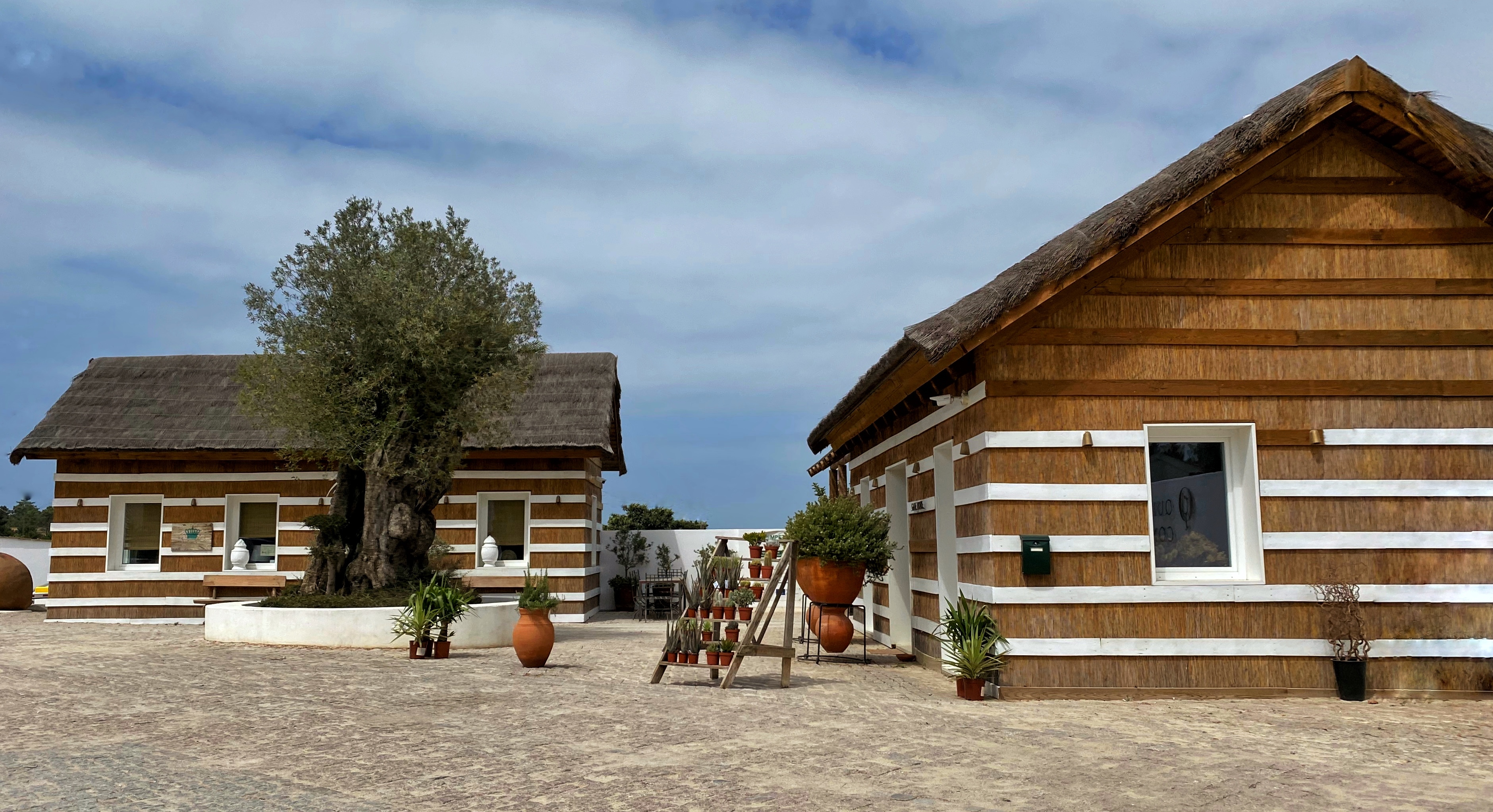
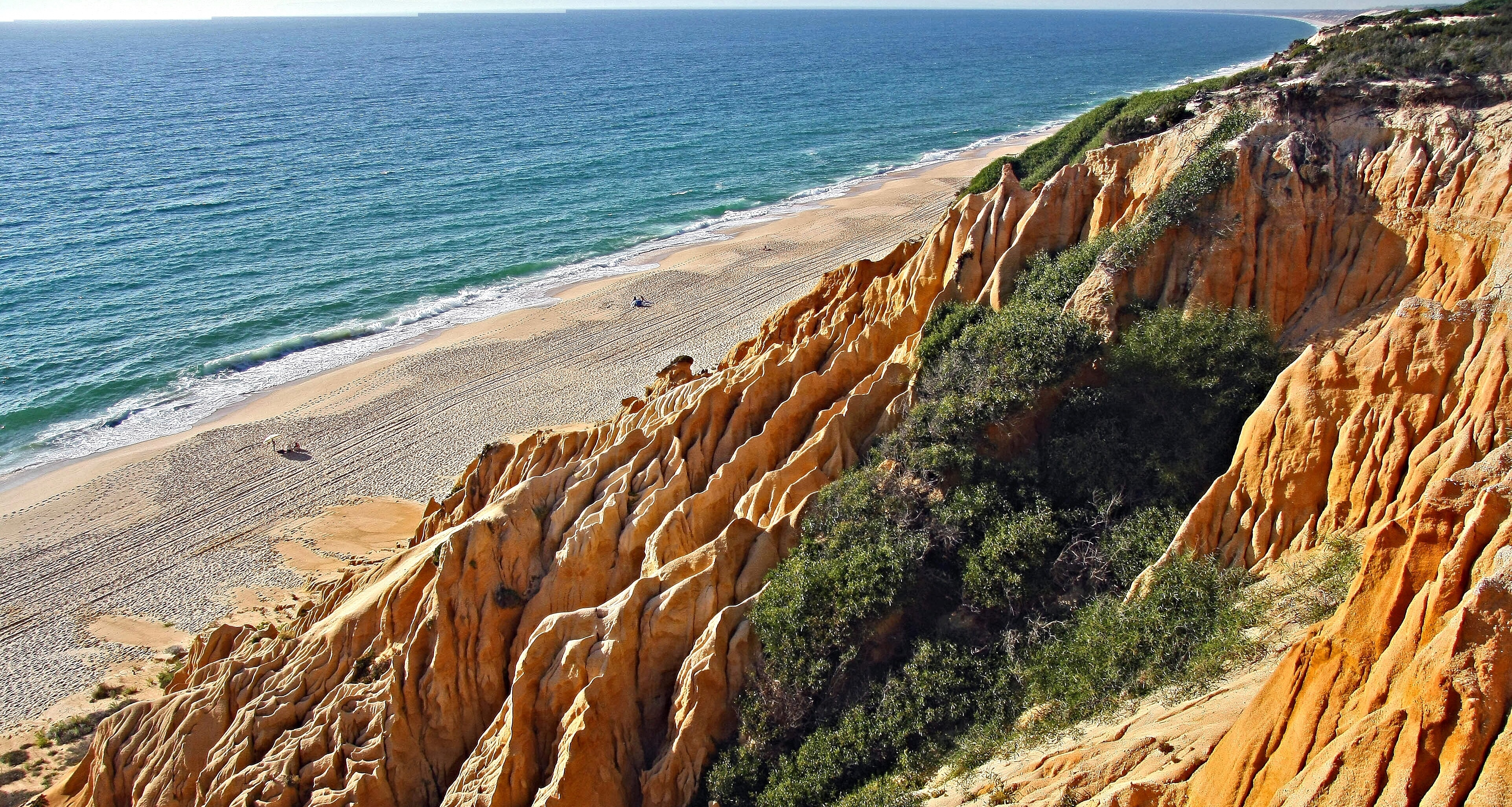
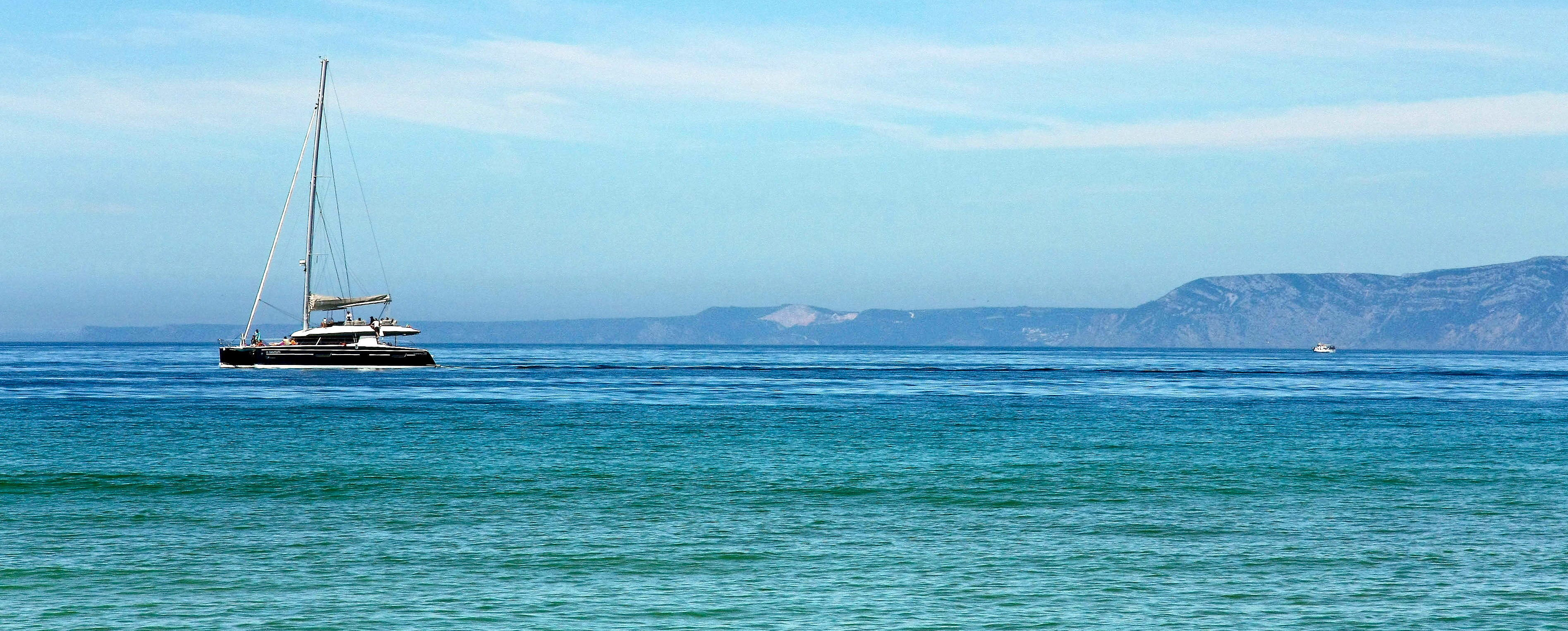
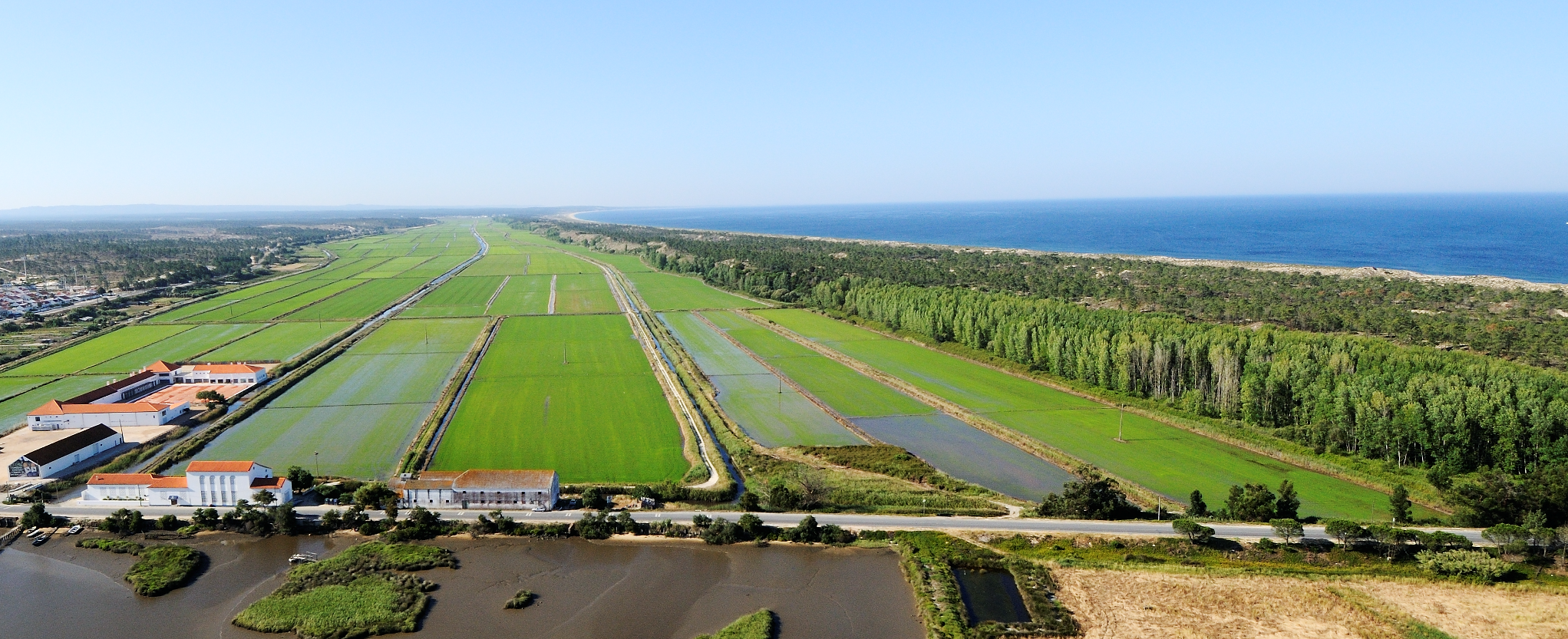
- Country: Portugal
- District: Setúbal District
- Municipalities: Alcácer do Sal; Grândola

Comporta, also known as the Comporta Coast (Portuguese: Costa da Comporta), is a region in the northwestern coast of the Alentejo, in Portugal, south of the Lisbon metropolitan area. Comporta is one of the most exclusive summer destinations in Europe, which has earned the region the nickname as "the Hamptons of Europe". The region, which takes its name from the village of Comporta, spans the coastal areas of the Alentejano municipalities of Alcácer do Sal and Grândola.

Comporta has become a notable design center and home to a community of famous designers and artists, including fashion designer Christian Louboutin, architect Philippe Stark, designer Pierre Yovanovitch, painter Jason Martin, amongst others. Comporta is associated with its so-called "Comporta Style" (Estilo Comporta in Portuguese), the local architectural and design style characterized by traditional Alentejan architecture, Bohemianism, and contemporary, ecological design.

== History ==
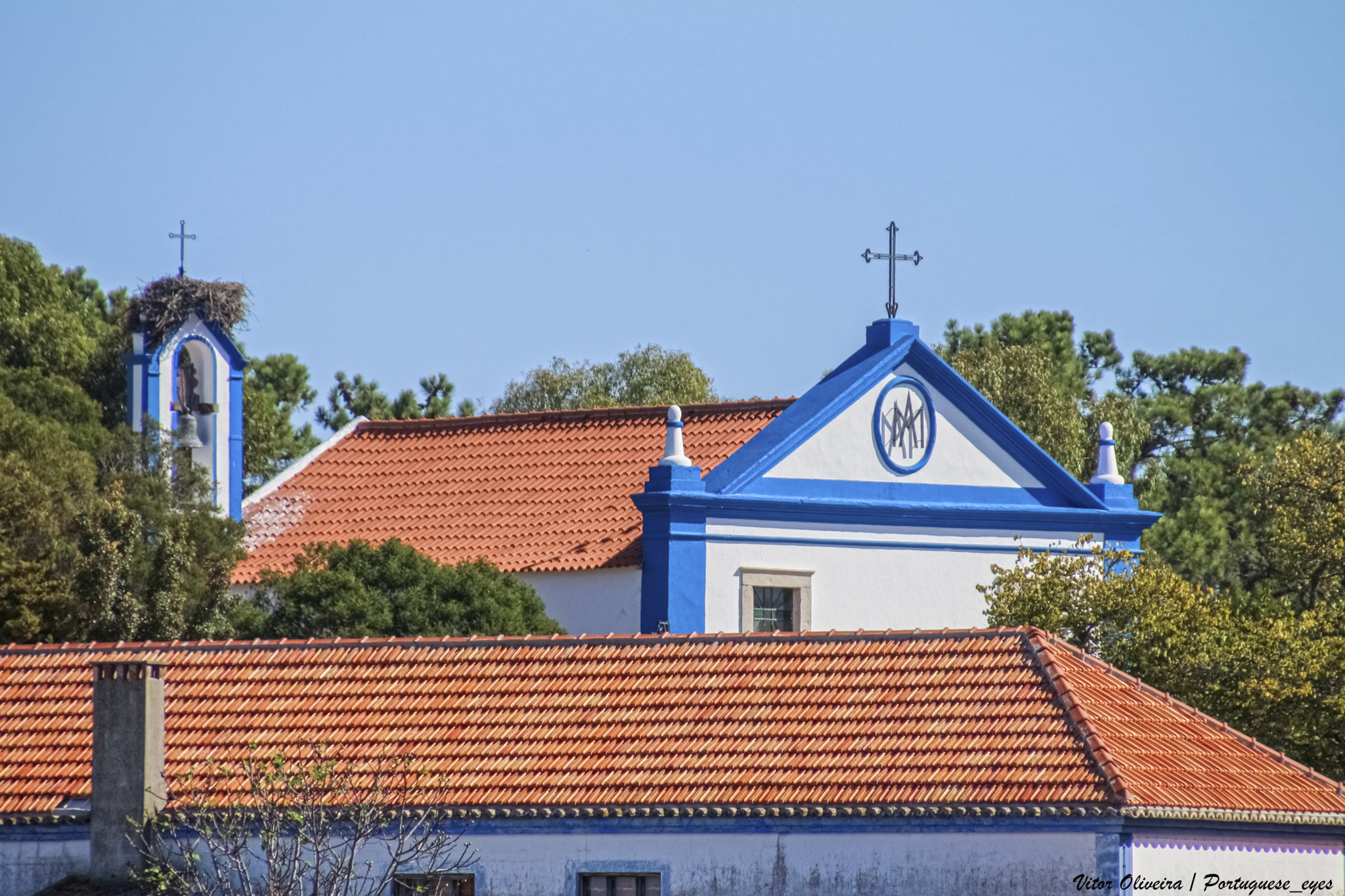
Historic center of the village of Comporta.

The history of the region of Comporta is intimately linked to the history of the Herdade da Comporta ("Estate of Comporta" in English), a massive agricultural estate formally constituted in 1836, with origins in the 12th century, which originally consisted of the majority of the land and villages in the modern region of Comporta, made up of the coastal areas of the Alcácer do Sal and Grândola municipalities. The area has traditionally been home to salt works, fishing communities, and rice fields.

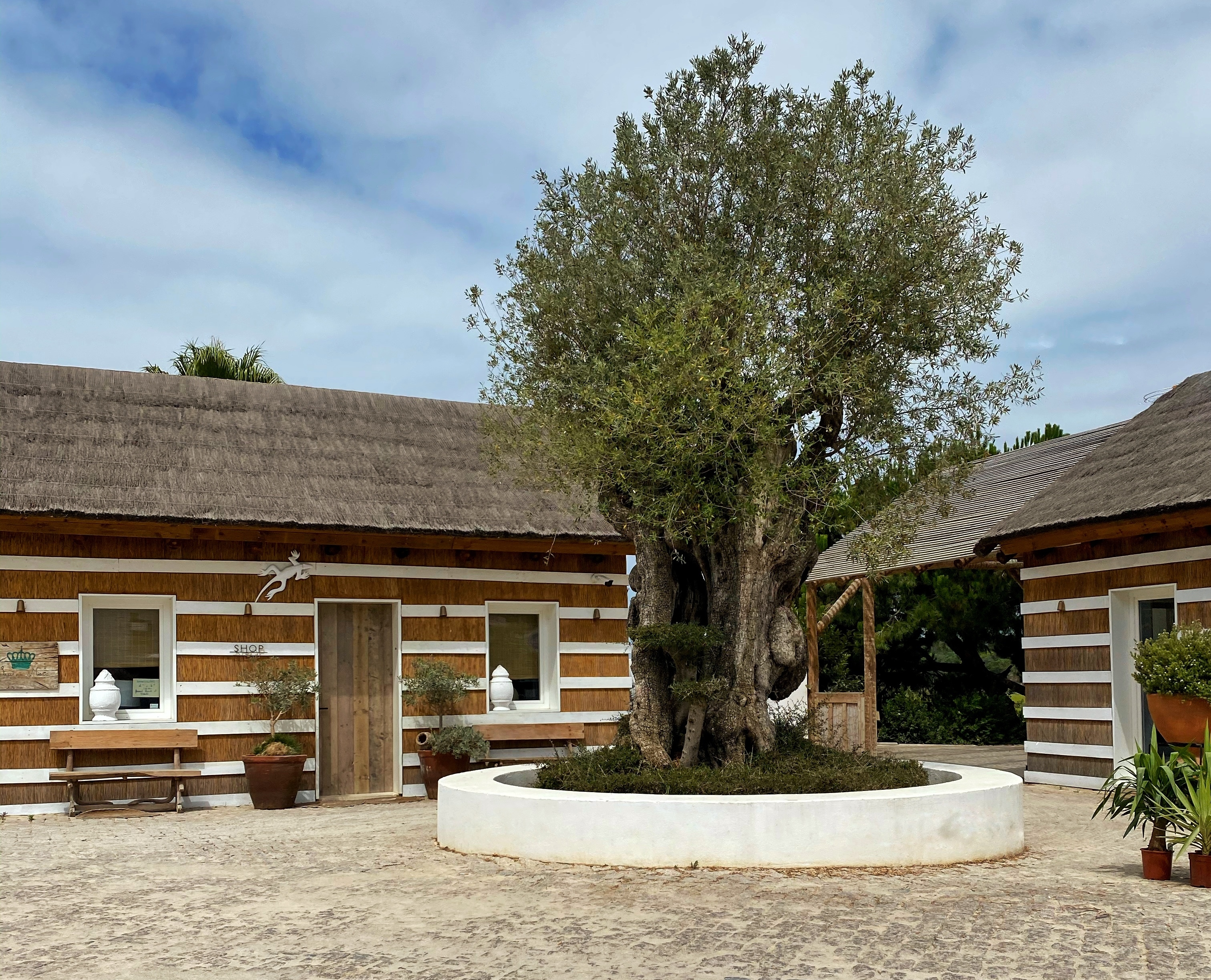
Comporta-style buildings in the village of Carvalhal

In 1991, after more than 150 years of operating as a purely agricultural estate, part of the Herdade da Comporta was developed into a luxery resort.

Initially, the Herdade attracted high-net-worth personalities to the area through personal connections with the Espírito Santo banking family, which owned the Herdade. During this time, the Espírito Santo family invited high profile celebrities as guests such as Prince Albert of Monaco and Princess Caroline of Hanover.

Following the collapse of the Banco Espírito Santo in 2014, courts ordered that the Espírito Santo family put the Herdade up for sale. In 2019, Paula Amorim, heiress to Portugal's largest fortune, concluded the purchase of the controlling share of the Herdade.

== Geography ==
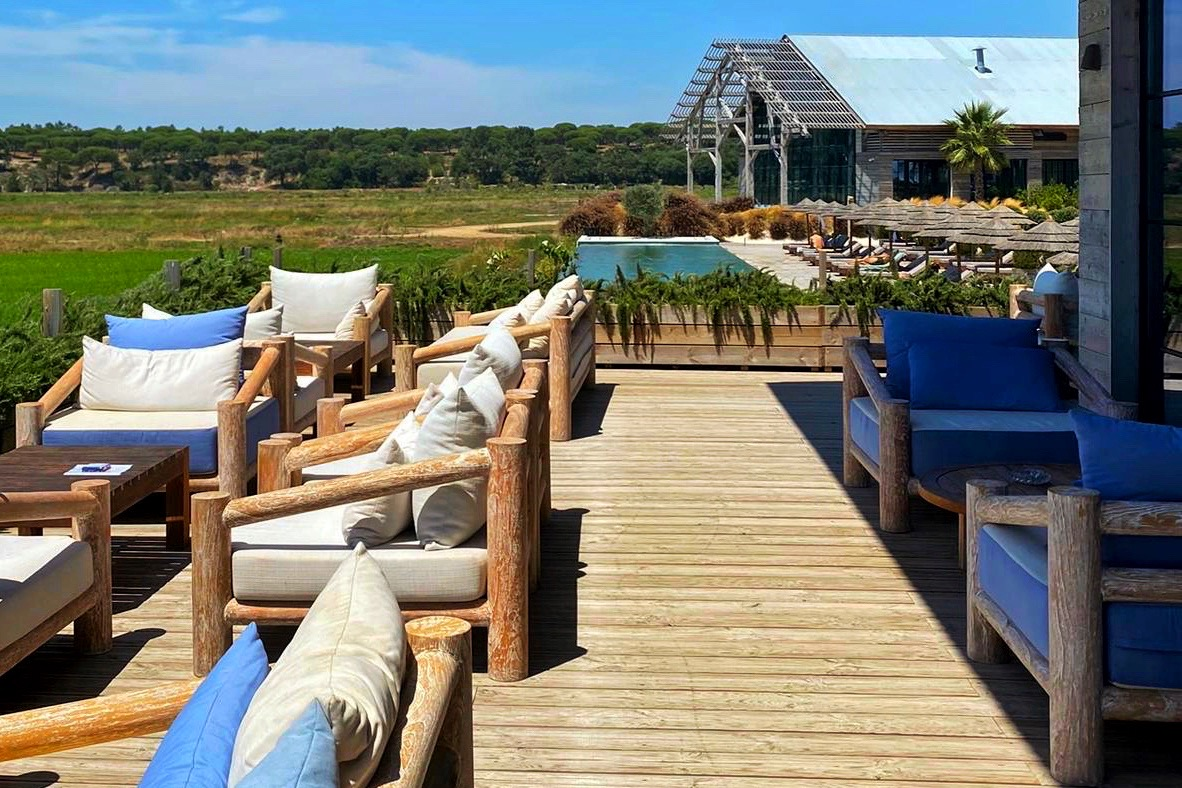
Quinta da Comporta

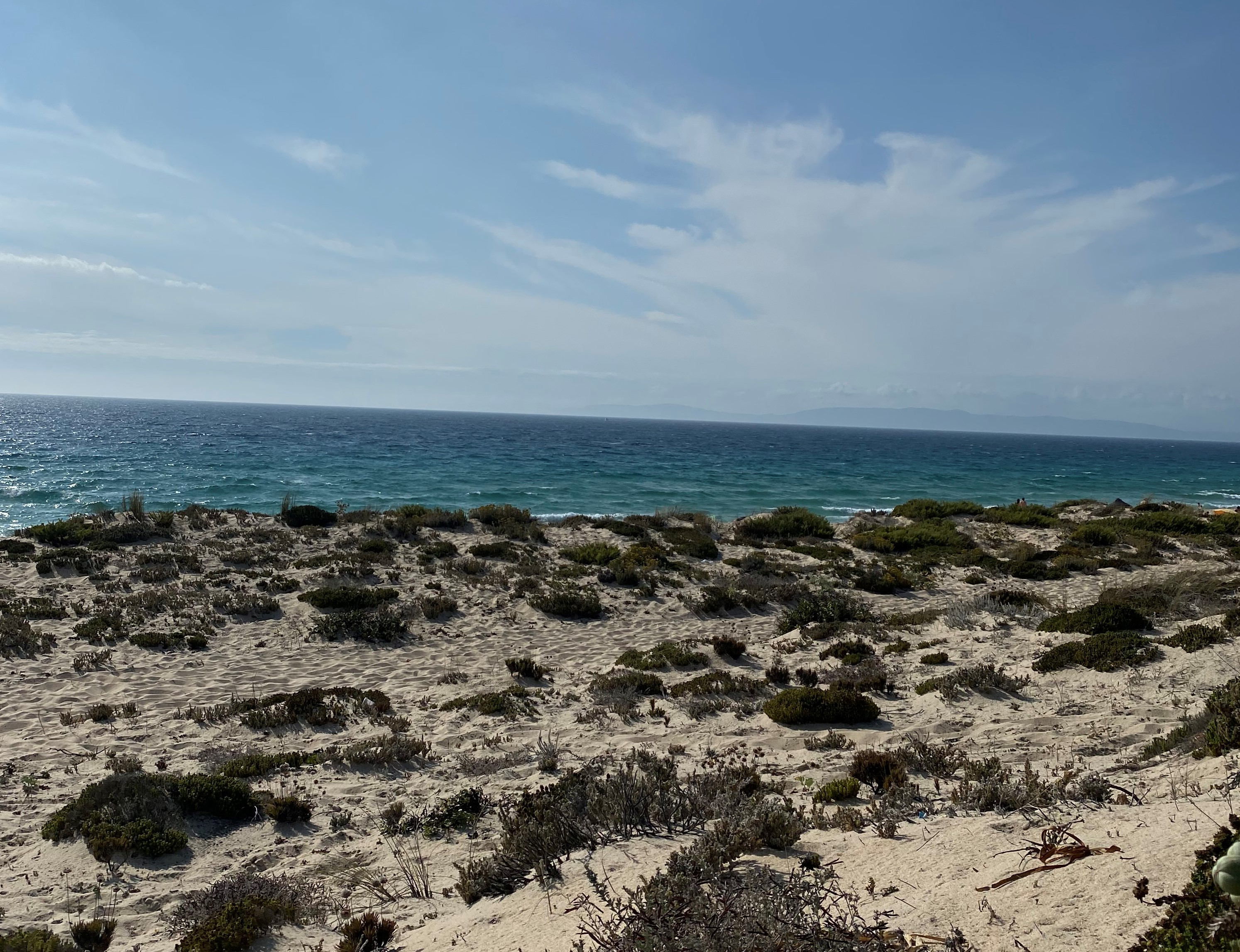
Praia do Pego

Comporta is located on the northwestern coast of the Alentejo, about an hour south of Lisbon. The majority of land in the region is protected from development as a nature preserve, while a significant portion is protected for traditional agricultural uses, such as rice fields and salt ponds. Restrictive development regulations were installed purposefully by the Herdade da Comporta and the municipal governments to both preserve the natural landscape of the region and ensure its exclusivity.

The region of Comporta is located within 2 concelhos (civil parishes) within the Alentejan municipalities of Alcácer do Sal and Grândola: Comporta, Carvalhal. The following towns and villages are located within the region:

- Comporta (village)
- Carrasqueira
- Possanco
- Cambado
- Pego
- Carvalhal
- Brejos da Carragueira
- Torre
- Muda
- Pinheirinho
- Sesmarias

=== Beaches ===
- Praia da Comporta
- Praia do Carvalhal
- Praia do Pego
- Praia dos Brejos
- Praia da Raposa
- Praia do Pinheirinho

== Culture ==
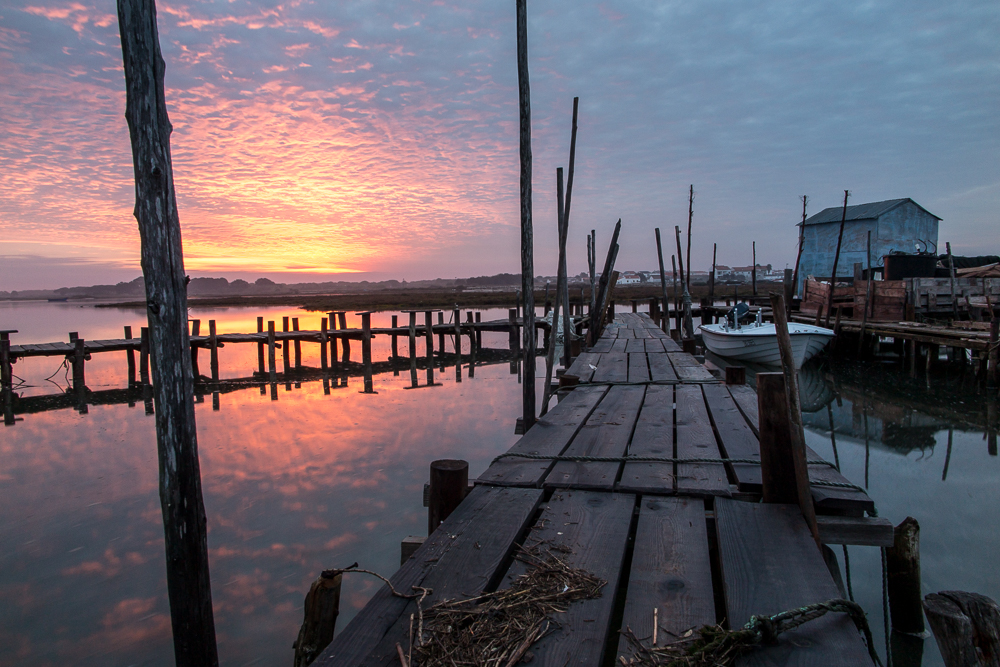
The Cais Palafítico in Carrasqueira

The development of the region by the Herdade da Comporta into a high-end destination in the 1990s, under the leadership of the Espírito Santo banking family, intentionally sought to attract notable artists, designers, and celebrities to the area, with the aim of building an exclusive artistic community for the jet-set. Notable artists and designers that reside in the region include fashion designer Christian Louboutin, architect Philippe Starck, painter Jason Martin, and art curator Marc-Olivier Wahler, among others.

Several shops cater to tourists, selling locally made scarves and hippie-chic dresses. Self-catering is assumed, with caviar, pink Himalayan salt, imported cheese and French Champagne being sold. Bars with red umbrellas advertise Sagres beer.

Comporta hosted an edition of the Wings for Life World Run in 2014.

Christian Louboutin shot his 2013 collection at the Cais Palafítico in Carrasqueira.

British painter Jason Martin established two art studios in Comporta in 2018, one in the village of Melides and the other in the middle of a natural reserve within the Herdade da Comporta.

=== Comporta style ===
The Comporta style, sometimes known as "Hippie Chic", is a local architectural and design style, developed by various architects and designers since the 1990s. The style is heavily influenced by traditional vernacular architecture of the Alentejo, ecological design, and regional arts and artisanry. Typical motifs include thatched roofing, straw plaiting, and Arraiolos rugs.

== Notable residents ==
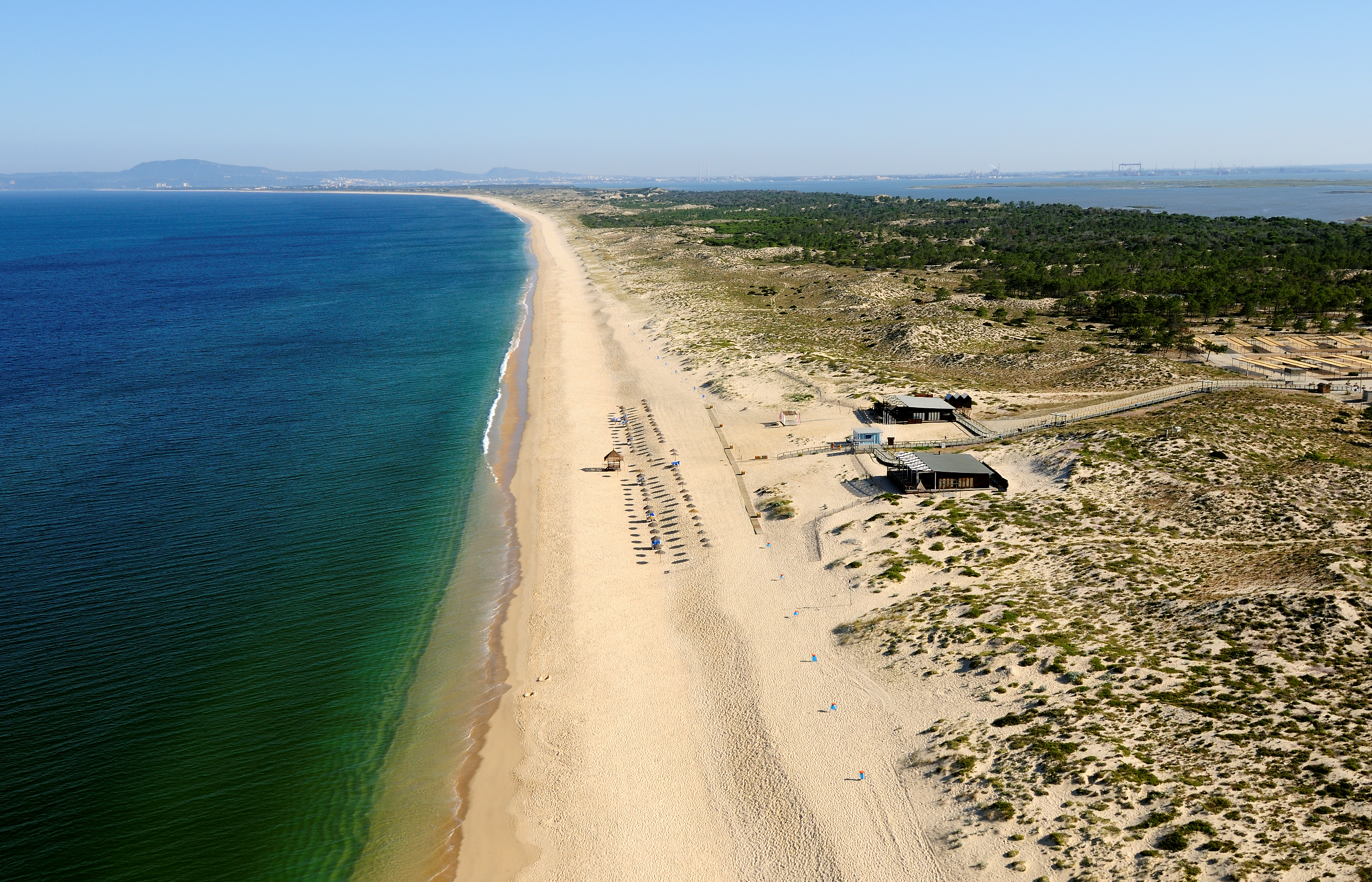
Aerial view of the Comporta Coast

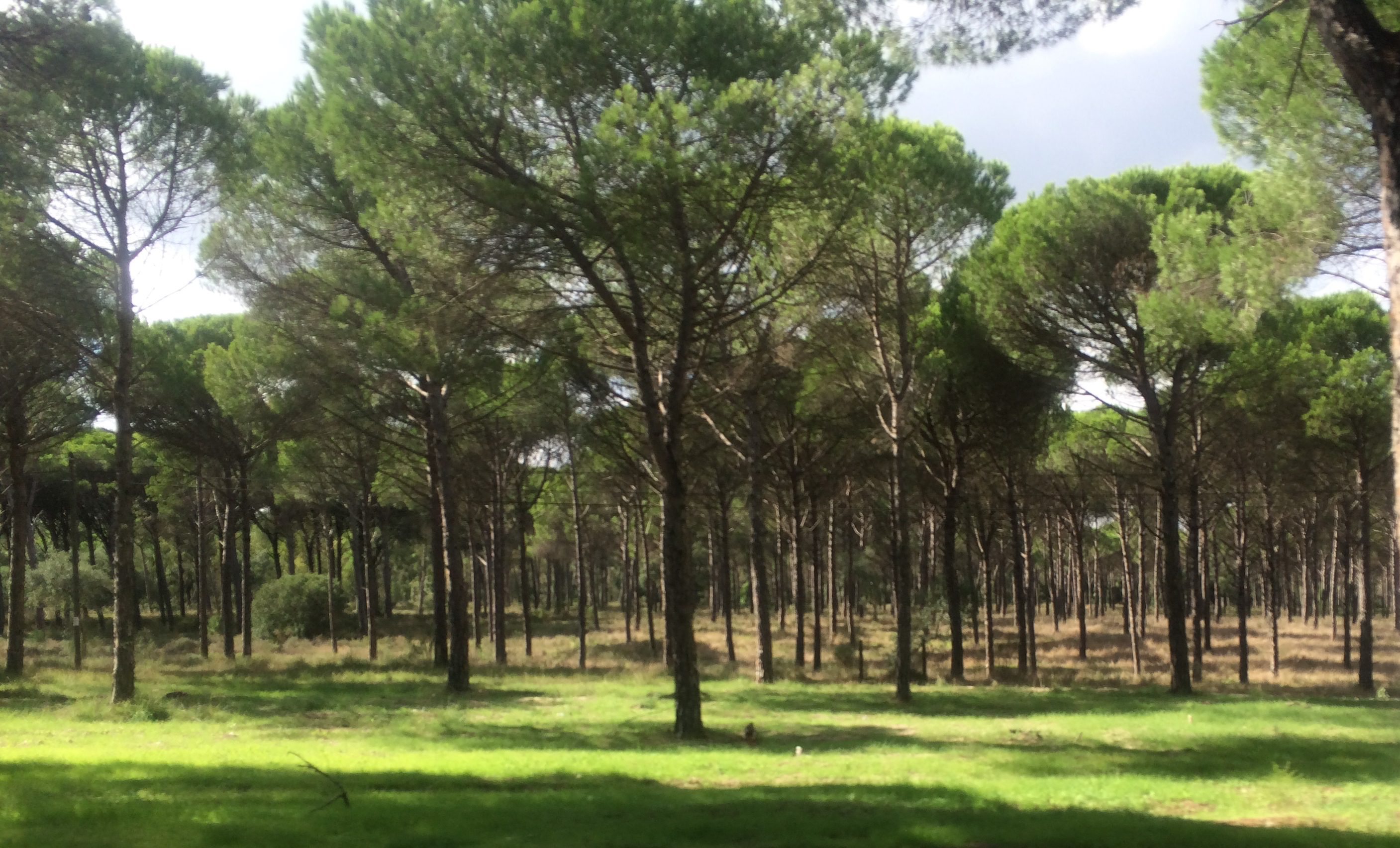
Stone pines in Comporta

- Christian Louboutin, French fashion designer
- Monica Bellucci, Italian actress and model
- Nicolas Sarkozy, former President of France
- Carla Bruni, Italian-French supermodel and singer
- Andrea Casiraghi, member of the Royal Family of Monaco
- Charlotte Casiraghi, member of the Royal Family of Monaco
- Philippe Starck, French architect
- Princess Diana de Cadaval, Portuguese princess and author
- Noemi Marone Cinzano, Italian countess & Cinzano heiress
- Marc-Olivier Wahler, Swiss art curator
- Jacques Grange, French interior designer
- Albina du Boisrouvray, French countess and Patiño heiress
- Pierre Yovanovitch, French designer
- Jason Martin, British painter
- Prince Louis Albert de Broglie, French prince and environmentalist
- Manuel Aires Mateus, Portuguese architect

== See also ==
- Alentejo
- Alentejan Coast
- Algarve
- Portuguese Riviera
