= David Row =

American painter

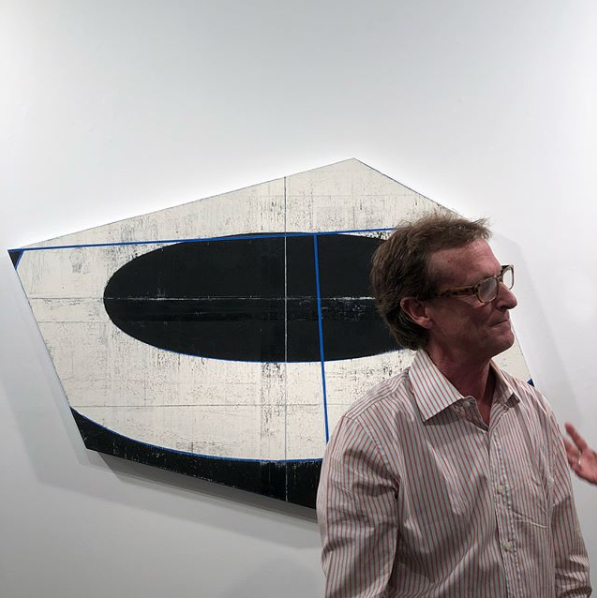
- Row in 2018
- Born: 1949 (age 76–77); Portland, Maine, U.S.
- Education: Yale University, Yale School of Art
- Known for: Painting
- Movement: Contemporary Art, Abstract Art
- Spouse: Kathleen Schenck Row
- Website: davidrow.com

David Row (born 1949) is a contemporary abstract painter associated with the movements of Postmodern Painting and Conceptual Abstraction. His primary aesthetic has evolved around a language of painterly fragmented geometric abstraction that is usually formed on shaped canvases and installations. Row lives and works in both New York City and Cushings Island, Maine. He is married to former AIGA NY Board president Kathleen Schenck Row.

== Early life and education ==
Row was born in Portland but grew up in Kolkata, India. Row went on to study art receiving both his BA and MFA degrees at Yale. During his time there he studied under Joseph Albers, Al Held, Lester Johnson, William Bailey, David von Schlegell, and Brice Marden.

Row has exhibited extensively since the late seventies starting out at alternative and nonprofit spaces such as the Drawing Center and PS122. He has been represented at various points in his career by John Good Gallery (New York), André Emmerich (New York), von Lintel Gallery (New York), Galerie Thaddaeus Ropac (Paris/Salzburg), Ascan Crone (Hamburg), Galerie Brandstetter & Wyss (Zürich) and currently with Loretta Howard Gallery (New York), Locks Gallery (Philadelphia) and McClain Gallery (Houston).

Row is also an established printmaker working with fine art edition presses such as Pace Prints, Two Palms Press and the Tamarind Institute.

He has also received grants and awards such as Yale Scholar of the House (1971-71), National Endowment for the Arts (1987), Issac N. Maynard Prize from the National Academy Museum and School (2008). David Row is also a member of American Abstract Artists.

Row has taught and lectured at The Cooper Union, Rhode Island School of Design, Pratt Institute, Fordham University and currently teaches in the School of Visual Arts MFA Program.

== Career ==
Row's practice has evolved into a series of inquires into the nature of perception using geometry and the physicality of paint. His paintings use cropped and fragmented overlapping ovals and polygons that create visual and illusionistic tension. Charles Hagen goes on to describes the work in an Artforum review, "Row's paintings have a sense of dynamism about them as if they were constantly on the verge of becoming something else - and then, perhaps becoming themselves again, By combining off geometric forms with richly expressive color, Row attempts to bridge the gap between systems and intuition, concept and action."

Peter Plagens wrote about Row's work, "Row is a master of his mode, and his astute cramming of geometric shapes (ovals are a favorite) into dynamically constricting formats makes his compositions seem all the more muscular. Recently, he's been working on polygons, and his color, while measured and considerably muted by his relentless attention to the surface, is nevertheless expert and crisp."

Ken Johnson referred to the Row's imagery as, "abstract paintings in which wide, arcing bands are played off rectangular division. Broad loopy lines and straight lines are squeegeed into richly layered fields, some in bright, synthetic hues, others in black and white."

The paint application has the texture not unlike screen printed ink or stenciled wiped surface which causes the image to appear blurred or obscured. Often marks remain from the use of such tools and other masking techniques as evidence of the process as well as aesthetic gesture. In reference to this painting critic Barry Schwabsky says, "The layering if the surface is in fact rather complex, and because Row uses the removal of the masking tape holding down the stencils as a marked steps in the painting process, the image is traversed, both at and under the surface but the grid formed 'ghosts' of the tape."

Times art critic Roberta Smith describes Row's work as, "layer together complex processes (including templates, screen printing and Richter-like blurs) with an imagery that centers on repeating open ellipses. Across separate panels and multicolored grids, and in lively contrasting colors, these ellipses disintegrate into coiled lines and then big flamelike strokes, with a centrifugal energy that can seem cinematic."

== Selected solo exhibitions ==
- 2018: Loretta Howard Gallery, New York, NY
- 2017: Locks Gallery, Philadelphia, PA
- 2016: Loretta Howard Gallery, New York City, NY
- 2014: Loretta Howard Gallery, New York City, NY
- 2013: McClain Gallery, Houston, TX
- 2006: Von Lintel Gallery, New York City, NY
- 2004: Von Lintel Gallery, New York City, NY
- 2001: Ulrich Museum, Wichita, KS
- 1996: André Emmerich, New York City, NY
- 1995: Locks Gallery, Philadelphia, PA
- 1995: Galerie Thomas von Lintel, Munich, Germany
- 1991: Galerie Thaddaeus Ropac, Paris, France
- 1991: John Good Gallery, New York, NY
- 1991 Richard Feigen Gallery, Chicago, IL
- 1990: Galerie Thaddaeus Ropac, Salzburg, Austria
- 1989: John Good Gallery, New York City, NY
- 1987: John Good Gallery, New York City, NY

== Selected group exhibitions ==
- 2012: Conceptual Abstraction, Hunter College / Times Square Gallery, New York City, NY
- 2011: Splendor of Dynamic Structure: Celebrating 75 Years of the American Abstract Artists, Johnson Museum of Art, Cornell University, Ithaca, NY
- 1996 A Critique of Pure Abstraction, Hammer Museum, UCLA, Los Angeles, CA
- 1991: Conceptual Abstraction. Sidney Janis Gallery, New York City, NY
- 1991: Strategies for the Last Painting, Feigen Gallery, Chicago, IL
- 1982: New Drawing in America, Drawing Center, New York City, NY

== Public collections ==
- Allentown Art Museum, Allentown, PA
- Brooklyn Museum, Brooklyn, New York City
- Mary and Leigh Block Museum of Art, Northwestern University, Chicago, IL
- Carnegie Museum of Art, Pittsburgh, PA
- The Cleveland Museum of Art, Cleveland, OH
- Ulrich Museum, Wichita, KS
- Hudson Valley MOCA, Peekskill, NY
- Metropolitan Museum of Art, New York City, NY
- Museum of Fine Arts, Houston, Houston, TX
- Portland Museum of Art, Portland, ME
- Spencer Museum of Art, University of Kansas, Lawrence, KS
- University Museum of Contemporary Art, UMASS, Amherst, MA
- Washington National Airport, Cesar Pelli Commission, Crystal City, VA
