= Sado Estuary Natural Reserve =

Nature reserve in Portugal

Sado Estuary Nature Reserve
- IUCN category IV (habitat/species management area)
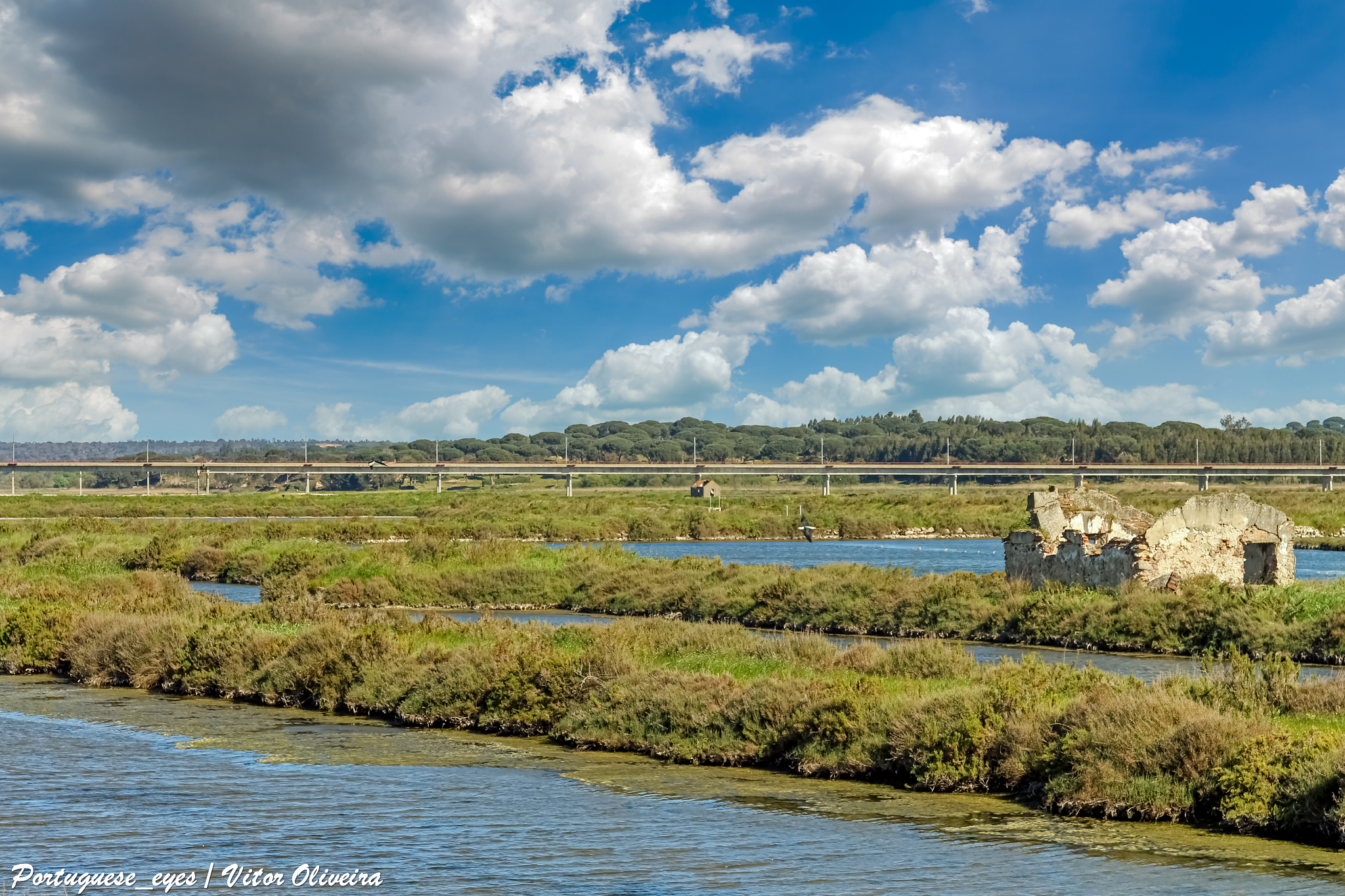

- Location within Portugal
- Location: Setúbal District
- Nearest city: Setúbal
- Coordinates: 38°27′20″N 8°45′30″W
- Area: 239.71 km^{2} (92.55 sq mi)
- Created: 1980
- Visitors: 78,566 (in 2017-2020 (average))
- Governing body: ICNF

Ramsar Wetland
- Official name: Estuário do Sado
- Designated: 8 May 1996
- Reference no.: 826

Sado Estuary Natural Reserve (Portuguese: Reserva Natural do Estuário do Sado) is a nature reserve in Portugal. It is one of the 30 areas which are officially under protection in the country. It is located between the municipalities of Alcácer do Sal, Comporta and Setúbal.

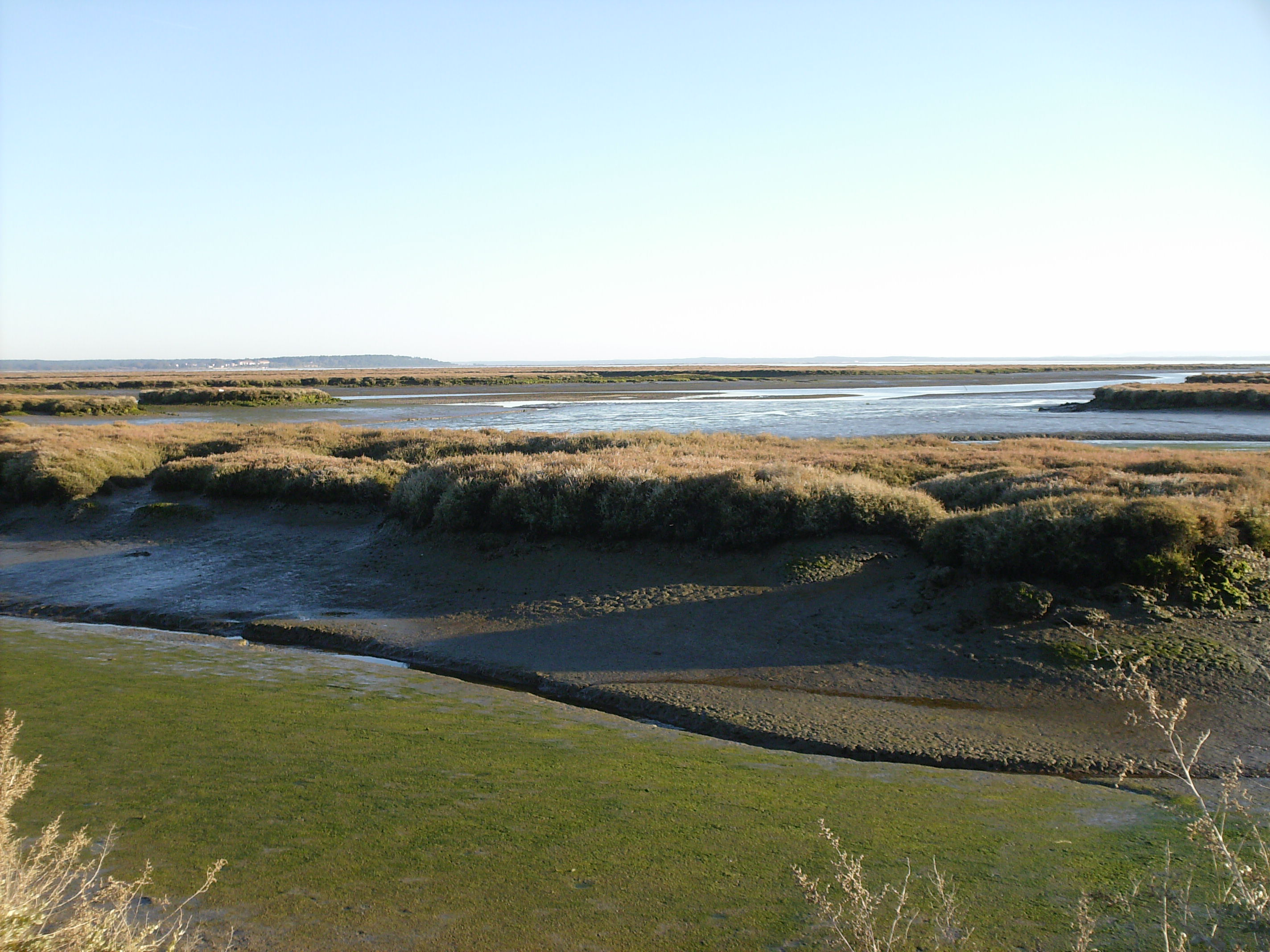

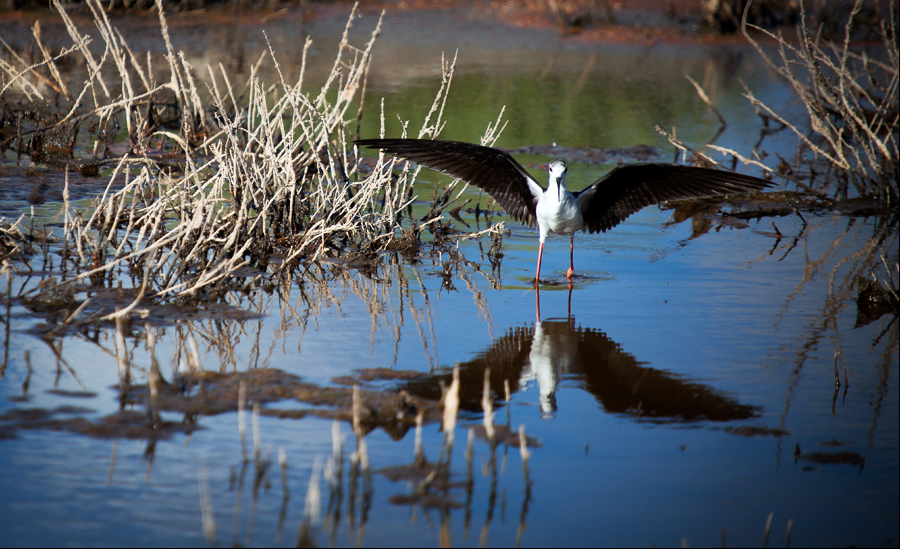

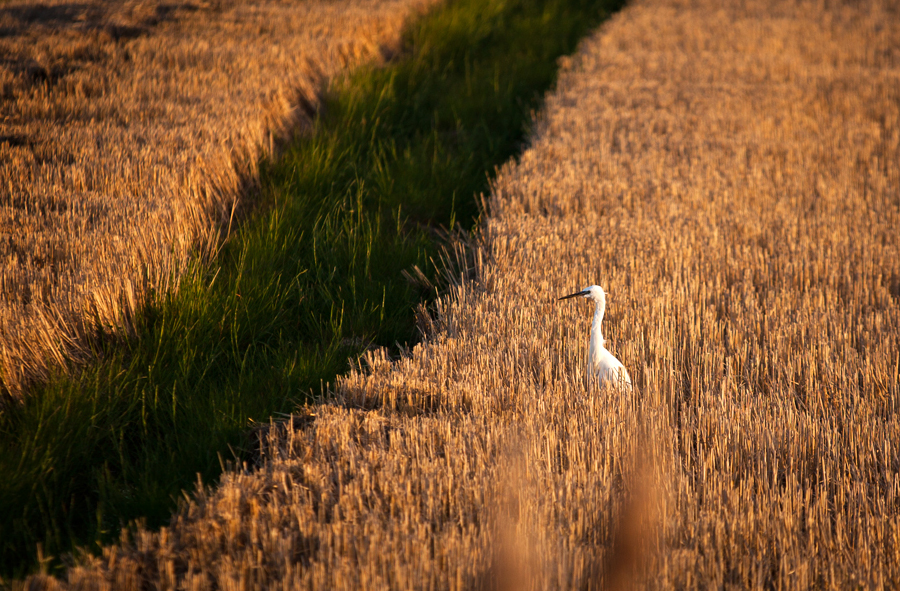

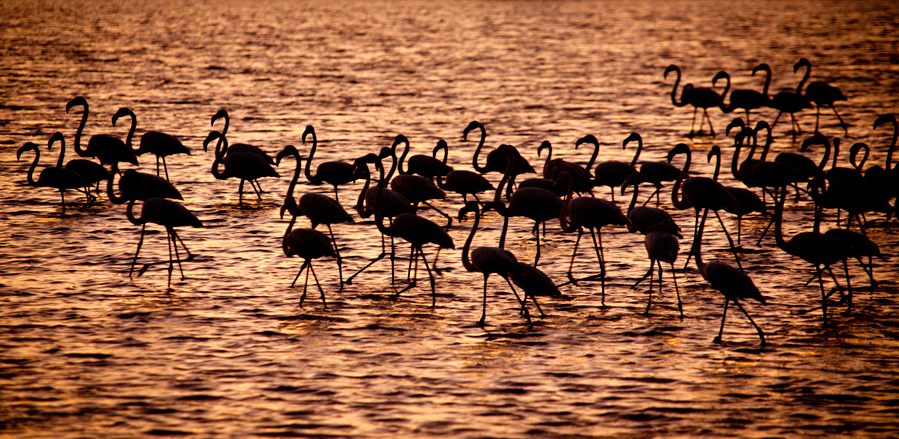

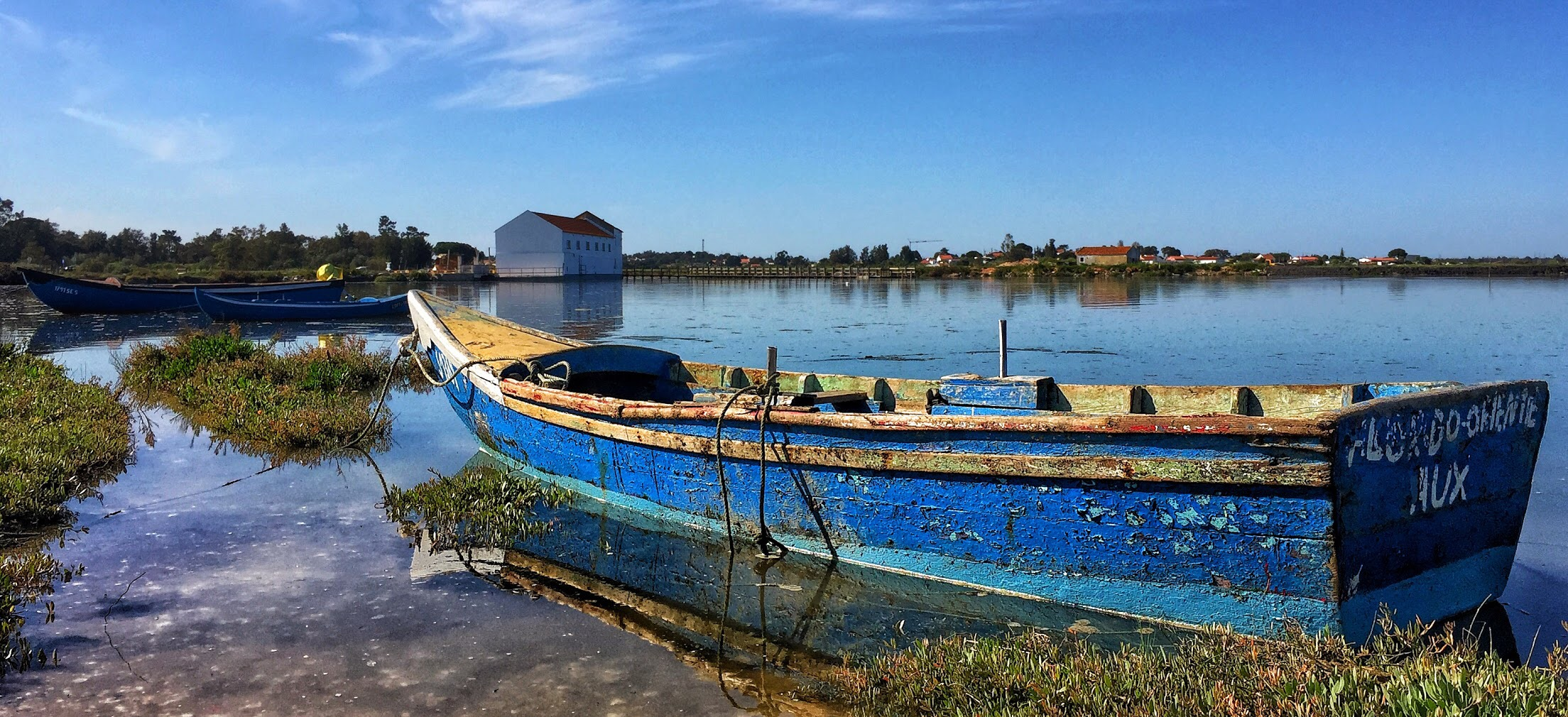
