= Thaddaeus Ropac (galleries) =

Group of art galleries by Thaddaeus Ropac

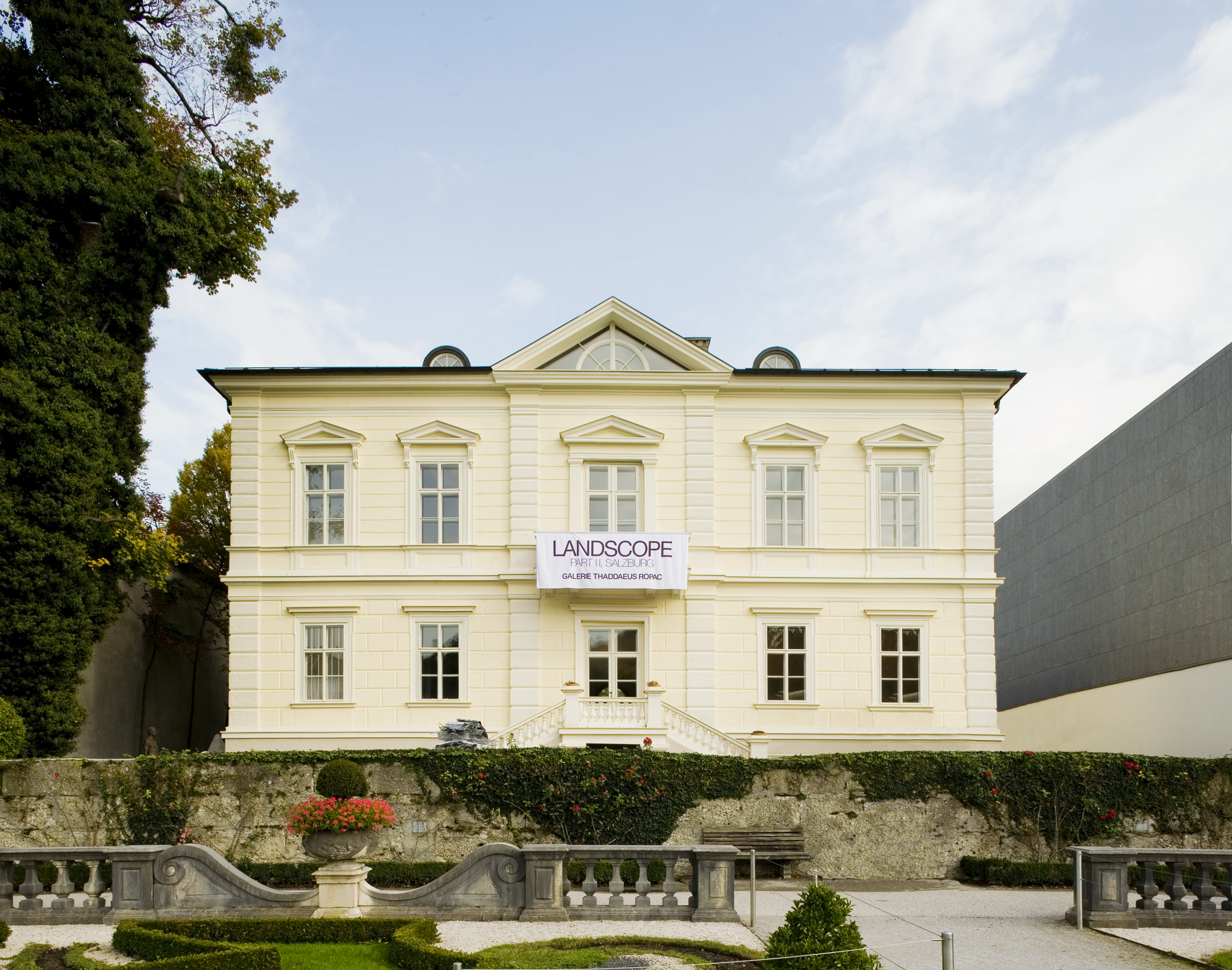
Thaddaeus Ropac Salzburg

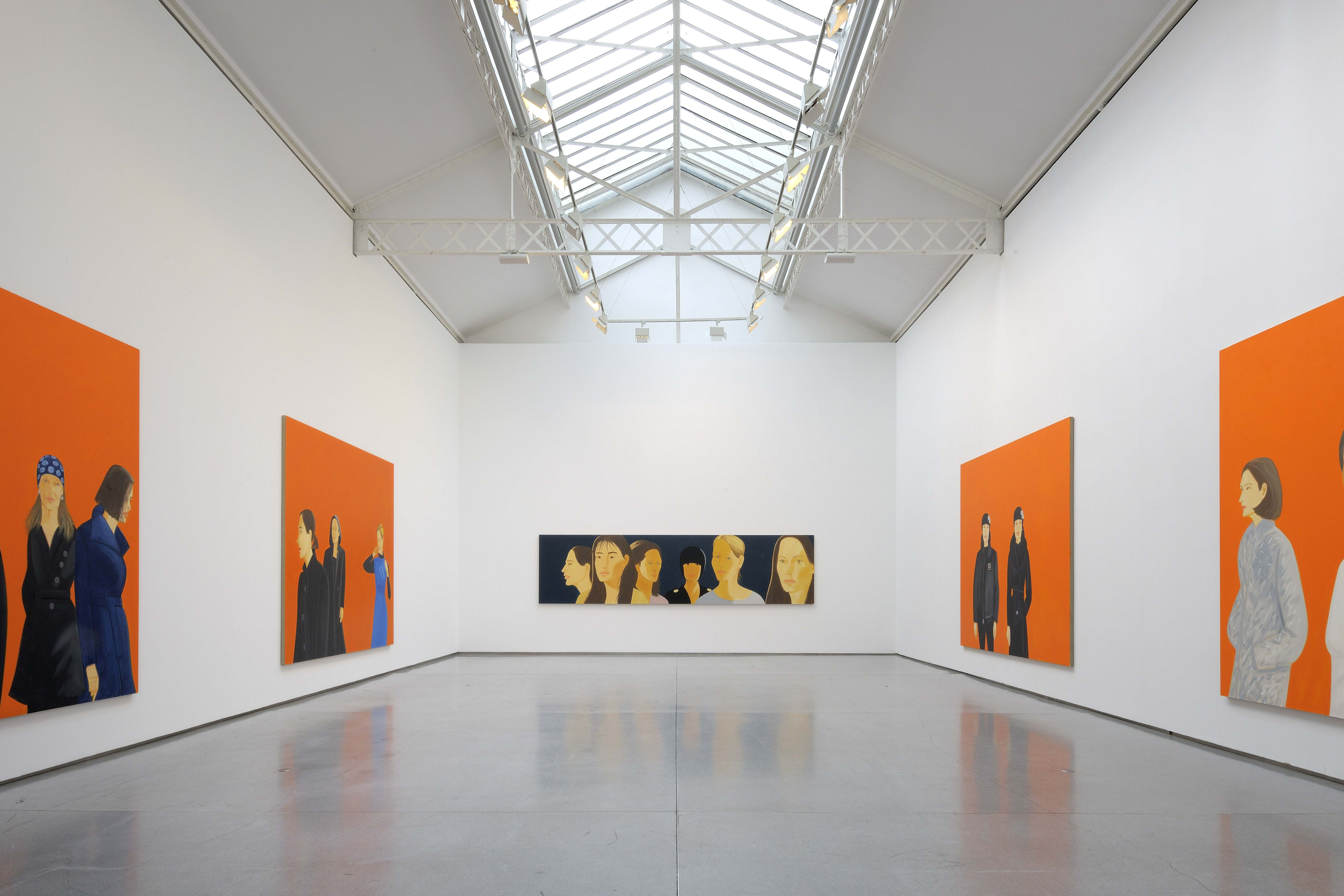
Thaddaeus Ropac Paris

Thaddaeus Ropac are a group of galleries founded in 1981 by the Austrian gallerist Thaddaeus Ropac and has since specialized in International Contemporary Art.

The group has galleries in Paris Le Marais, Paris Pantin, Salzburg, London, Seoul, and Milan .

== History ==
=== Lienz and Salzburg ===
The gallery was founded 1981 as "Galerie Thaddäus J. Ropač/ Edition Rotha" in Lienz, Austria. It opened a gallery in Salzburg in 1983, first located at the Kaigasse 40, and then moved to Villa Kast in 1989, a 19th-century townhouse in Mirabell Garden.

In March 2010, the gallery opened its "Salzburg Halle", an additional exhibition space within an industrial building close to the city centre of Salzburg.

=== Paris ===
In 1990, Thaddaeus Ropac opened his primary Paris space in the Le Marais quarter. Ropac hosted an inaugural show featuring American artists Jeff Koons and conceptual artist Elaine Sturtevant, marking a significant expansion in his gallery's reach and influence.

The 5,100 m^{2} (55,000 sq ft) Pantin location opened in October 2012.

=== London ===
Thaddaeus Ropac opened a 1,500 m^{2} (16,000 sq ft) gallery branch in the Ely House in Mayfair, London, in Spring 2017.

=== Seoul ===
In mid-2021, Thaddaeus Ropac announced plans to open a new space in Seoul’s Hannam-dong district. A second space was added in 2023.

== Work and current exhibitions ==
Since 2005, in partnership with the Robert Mapplethorpe Foundation, Ropac asked Hedi Slimane, Robert Wilson, Sofia Coppola and Isabelle Huppert to act as guest curators and to select a series of the foundation's images for several gallery shows.

=== A selection of current gallery artists ===
- Cory Arcangel
- Jules de Balincourt
- Georg Baselitz
- Lee Bul (since 2007)
- Tony Cragg
- Richard Deacon
- Valie Export (since 2017)
- Sylvie Fleury
- Gilbert & George
- Adrian Ghenie (since 2015)
- Antony Gormley
- Alex Katz
- Anselm Kiefer
- Imi Knoebel
- Wolfgang Laib
- Jonathan Lasker
- Jason Martin
- Jonathan Meese
- Ron Mueck (since 2020)
- Jack Pierson
- Arnulf Rainer
- Tom Sachs
- David Salle
- Joan Snyder (since 2024)
- Banks Violette
- Lawrence Weiner
- Erwin Wurm

In addition to living artists, Thaddaeus Ropac also handles the estates of the following:

- Joseph Beuys (since 2018)
- Rosemarie Castoro (since 2019)
- Donald Judd (since 2018)
- Robert Mapplethorpe
- Robert Rauschenberg (since 2015)
- James Rosenquist (since 2017)
- Sturtevant
- Andy Warhol
