= Jonathan Lasker =

American abstract painter (born 1948)

- Lasker in his New York studio in 2007
- Born: 1948; Jersey City, New Jersey
- Education: School of Visual Arts, California Institute of the Arts
- Known for: Painting
- Movement: Contemporary art, abstract art

Jonathan Lasker (born 1948) is an American abstract painter based in New York City whose work has played an integral role in the development of Postmodern Painting. He is represented by Greene Naftali Gallery, New York and by Thaddaeus Ropac.

Lasker has been awarded National Endowment for the Arts Fellowship Grants in 1987 and again in 1989. In 1989 he was also awarded the New York Foundation for the Arts Fellowship Grant. His work has been covered in Artforum, Artscribe, Arts Magazine, Flash Art, New Art Examiner, New York Magazine, The New York Times, Tema Celeste, Village Voice, Bomb Magazine, and The Washington Post among others. He was the subject of the 2005 book Jonathan Lasker: Expressions Become Things by Richard Milazzo which documented his process of developing abstract compositions from sketches to paintings.

== Early life and education ==
Lasker was born in Jersey City, New Jersey, and attended the School of Visual Arts (SVA) in New York City as well as the California Institute of the Arts (CalArts) in Valencia, California. He spent his teenage years reading widely, with a special interest in the Beat poets and in such early modern playwrights as August Strindberg, George Bernard Shaw, and Eugene O'Neill.

Originally aspiring to become a musician, Lasker left New York after studying at Queens College and played bass guitar and blues harmonica in bands in the US and Europe. In 1975, after resettling in New York, he began taking night courses at the SVA, where he turned his attention to paintings and collages inspired by the work of Robert Rauschenberg. He continued studying at SVA until 1977, when he transferred to the California Institute of the Arts in Valencia, California.

Lasker spent the spring and fall semesters of 1977 at CalArts. As a painter, he was challenged by the prevailing Conceptualist position at the school, which was critical of painting for what was viewed as its acceptance of received modes of expression. While some of his professors were openly opposed to painting, two guest instructors whose time at CalArts coincided with Lasker's — the New Image painter Susan Rothenberg and the Pop Art/Minimal art artist Richard Artschwager — offered insights into overcoming the critical impasse imposed upon contemporary painting by formalist theory.

Lasker discussed this period in an interview with Amy Bernstein:

At CalArts, to be a painter meant you had to take a stance, because there was a very antagonistic attitude towards painting there. In a way it was good for me, because it forced me to shape my reasons for making paintings. It also forced me to make paintings that had reasons for being paintings. So I think, in a way it pushed me in a good direction, although the experience was alienating.

The ideas that Lasker adopted at this early stage in his career brought an analytical approach to the supposedly outmoded practice of making a painting by hand. Lasker's solution was to create a recurring vocabulary of motifs of texture, shape, color, and line that he would arrange and rearrange from painting to painting, as if they were a cast of characters entering and exiting a stage.

In "Image Kit", an essay Lasker wrote in 1986 and later revised for a book of his complete essays published in 1998, he describes the distancing and self-consciousness on the part of both the artist and viewer that is fundamental to his work:

I often think of my paintings as a form of image kit or perhaps as jigsaw puzzles, which offer components of painting as clues pointing the viewer, not to a finished narrative (as when the last piece of the jigsaw puzzle completes a picture of Notre Dame), but rather to a self-awareness of how one construes a painting.

The art historian and curator Robert Hobbs refers to the kind of painting practiced by Lasker and such peers as Ross Bleckner, Peter Halley, Mary Heilmann, and David Reed as meta-abstraction. He has also been called a Conceptual painter.

== Early career (1978–1984) ==
In October 1977, two months before he left CalArts, Lasker painted "Illinois", which he considers his breakthrough work. The painting takes its name from a white abstract shape in the lower left-hand corner of the canvas, which resembles the map of the titular state. The importance he places on the painting derives from his realization that the elements constituting the work — the scumbled, grayish green field; the shapes painted in solid black or solid white; and the off-register black brushstrokes delineating the white shapes and separating them from the field — could function outside the traditional figure/ground relationship. As he stated in a conversation with Hobbs, "It struck me that there was a role reversal of figure to ground, in that the assertiveness of the ground challenged the figure for dominance."

After leaving CalArts at the end of 1977, Lasker spent two years living and working in San Francisco, California, where he saw retrospectives of the painters Philip Guston and Jasper Johns at the San Francisco Museum of Modern Art. He also spent time studying the thickly textured Abstract Expressionist canvases of Clyfford Still in the museum's permanent collection, as well the painting House of Cards (1960) by Al Held, which is filled with brightly colored and broadly outlined geometric shapes.

In August 1979, Lasker moved back to New York, where he lived on St. Mark's Place in the East Village. Within a year, in June 1980. Landmark Gallery in Soho offered him his first solo show, which opened in January 1981. One of the people who saw that show was the art dealer Tony Shafrazi, who invited Lasker to participate in his own gallery's debut group exhibition on Mercer Street in Soho. Also included in the show were Keith Haring, Donald Baechler, and Ronnie Cutrone.

Also in 1981, Lasker had his first exhibition in Europe, at Galerie Gunnar Kaldewey, in Düsseldorf, Germany, where his work was noticed by the art dealer David Nolan, who was then working with Galerie Michael Werner in Cologne. Over the next several years Lasker showed his paintings at Tibor de Nagy Gallery in midtown Manhattan. In the 1984 exhibition, Fact and Fiction, his work was hung alongside that of Thomas Nozkowski and Gary Stephan, two artists with whom Lasker was having extensive discussions about abstract painting. He had a solo show at Tibor de Nagy that year and again in 1986.

== Development (1984–present) ==
In 1984, Lasker was introduced to the curators Tricia Collins and Richard Milazzo (known as Collins & Milazzo), who were among the most influential tastemakers of the time and catalysts in what the curator Dan Cameron called "the late-'80s neo-Conceptual takeover of the East Village."

Collins & Milazzo included Lasker's work in three of the four exhibitions they organized in New York in 1985: Final Love at C.A.S.H./Newhouse Gallery; Paravision at Postmasters Gallery; and Cult and Decorum at Tibor De Nagy Gallery. These shows placed Lasker in a contemporary context that included such artists as Ross Bleckner, Jeff Koons, Peter Halley, and Robert Gober, among others — an association that was affirmed by museum shows over the course of the next decade.

That same year, Michael Werner invited Lasker to Cologne to make paintings for a solo exhibition at his gallery there, which opened in 1986. While working in a former horse stable at Schloss Loersfeld in the countryside near Cologne, Lasker developed the working method he has followed ever since. He begins by drawing on small pads of paper, choosing several sketches for further development. He then makes small versions of the selected images in oil paint on paper, putting those compositions through several variations. From these images he creates large, finished paintings, transferring the elements of the studies freehand to the canvas. "Above all for me, it's not the act of painting that's important, it's the picture. The studies are a means of perfecting composition."

Writing in 1985, the critic and philosopher David Carrier summed up Lasker's practice:

Pressed to indicate in a phrase what was unique about Jonathan Lasker's art, I would say that he shows how purely abstract painting may be composed in layers to create a satisfying tension between surface and depth. Count forward from the rear of his space: (1) the deep background, a field of stripes or other allover decorative surface; (2) several object shapes placed before that background; (3) heavy, usually black, drawing on or in front of those objects. Modernists flattened the picture space so that even depicted forms (Klee, Dubuffet, Diebenkorn in his representational period) inhabit a place too shallow to contain more than the outlines of those figures. Lasker moves in the reverse direction. Because his space contains plenty of open room, he can place in a picture a whole array of nonrepresentational forms.

Lasker views the densely painted autonomous shapes in his compositions as "things of paint", a term that consciously recalls the Minimalist concept of "specific objects", a term that is also the title of the seminal 1965 essay by Donald Judd advocating the "use of three dimensions", in new art, often incorporating industrial materials. From Judd's perspective, such materials, unlike traditional paint and canvas, are "not diluted by an inherited format, variations of a form, mild contrasts and connecting parts and areas"; nor are the elements of specific objects "subordinate to the unity" of a delimiting entity, such as a painting's rectangular canvas support.

In response, Lasker has proposed a critical rethinking of "specific objects" so that they "could be re-applied to the objects in a picture". Rather than harmonize his elements in the interest of compositional unity, he endeavored to "make the paintings dialectical and to have them be conflicted images which would create a dialogue." By aggressively using paint-as-paint — whose patterns, colors, textures, and facture often seem in pointed opposition to one another — Lasker is paying close attention to, as Judd put it, "the obdurate identity of a material."

Despite his practice's analytical approach to painting and his critique of Minimalism, Lasker does not see himself as a painter who works to prescribed theories. As he explained in an interview with the poet and critic John Yau: "There's a theoretical notion of how to create an artwork, and there was no prescribed theory for these paintings as I developed them."

Significant retrospectives of his work have been held at Greene Naftali Gallery (New York), Musée d'art Modern et Contemporain de Saint-Étienne Métropole (Saint Étienne), Museo Nacional Centro de Arte Reina Sofía (Madrid), Contemporary Art Museum (St. Louis), The Power Plant Contemporary Art Gallery (Toronto), among other notable galleries and institutions.

== Writing and use of language ==
Lasker has written a number of essays on art, artists, and other topics. In 1998, he compiled his texts, many of them short and epigrammatic, in Complete Essays 1984-1998, published by Edgewise in 1998. It includes "Image Kit" (1986/1998); "After Abstraction" (1986), which was written as a catalogue essay for the group exhibition What It Is at the Tony Shafrazi Gallery; "Abstraction, Past Itself" (1987), from the catalogue for the 40th Biennial Exhibition of Contemporary American Painting at the Corcoran Gallery in Washington, DC; and "The Subjects of the Abstract" (1995), written for the catalogue of the group exhibition Transatlantica: The America Europa Non-Representiva at the Museo Alejandro Otero in Caracas, Venezuela.

These essays, among others, dwell on the nature of painting and often double as artists' statements. The book also contains essays on Eugene Leroy and Willem de Kooning, as well as observations on such subjects as life in New York's East Village and horse racing at Aqueduct Racetrack.

Lasker also sees the titling of his paintings as a form of writing. "The titles are really my one-line shot at being a poet." He does not attempt to manipulate the viewer's interpretation of the work, but instead seeks language that reflects the ambiguity of his images, although he occasionally refers to the process of making the painting, as in Beat the System (1985) and Sensible Arrangement (1995).

Aside from titling paintings, there is a critical dialogue related to semiotics taking place in his work. As he has noted, "over the years, as [the] subject of language [in my paintings] has been introduced and reintroduced by others, I am sure it has influenced my own thinking about the work, and I have approached my painting a bit more from a language point of view." However, "the big issue was not originally, specifically language, but the idea that there would be conflict and argument within the picture."

== Critical reception ==
In 1981, Douglas Welch wrote the first article published on Lasker, a one-page essay in the January issue of Arts Magazine, in anticipation of Lasker's debut solo exhibition opening that month at the Landmark Gallery.

The first critical study of Lasker was David Carrier's "Painting into Depth: Jonathan Lasker's Recent Art", published in the January 1985 issue of Arts, and the question of Lasker's content was already a topic of debate saying, "Some abstract paintings look portrait-like, while many others are landscapes of the mind; Lasker's suggest, rather, a man-made space, a proscenium in which his shapes and drawings are to be placed."

Five years later, the art historian and critic Joseph Masheck also makes a different connection to theater in "Painting in Double Negative: Jonathan Lasker", in which he rejects facile associations with the concepts of simulacra and simulation, or, as he put it, "the cult of Baudrillard," and instead projects Lasker's painting through the lens of Antonin Artaud's The Theater and Its Double (1938):

It cannot have escaped Lasker that his own work, however, smart, is much less simplistic and shows rather less 'attitude' than fashion dictates. He seems to paint out of suave disgust for the pseudo-radical philistines' antipathy toward painting. Thus I see his work not as an empty, ill-defined 'double' for painting, that is, as part of the current bourgeois anti-art voodoo, but as a true treble to that false double.

The critic Barry Schwabsky, in his reading of Lasker's work, adds another layer of complexity, that of an ambiguous relationship to metaphor within Lasker's central focus on paint-as-paint. In a review of a solo exhibition at the Rose Museum of Brandeis University, he writes:

Jonathan Lasker once told me he thought the Minimalists had been trying to make an art without metaphor, and in fact had succeeded; but the point having been proved, he continued, there's no longer an urgent motivation to produce more metaphor-free work. But neither, I would add, is there any special reason to create metaphor-laden art—that is, unless the metaphors carry conviction. Lasker's paintings puzzle over precisely this question: what's credible in painting, for now, and why.

Art critic Demetrio Paparoni addresses the subject of Lasker and metaphor in the essay "An Abstract Logo for Democracy in Art":

In contrast to Mondrian, [Lasker] does not desire the painting to be an object in itself and, in order to leave space for metaphor, confers subjective value on color. Most importantly, he considers the creative thought process behind the work and the sentiment that animates his formal choices of equivalent import.

The critic and historian Robert Hughes posted a review on Artslant of Lasker's solo exhibition at Galerie Thaddaeus Ropac in Paris, in which he rejects the idea that Lasker's work is about anything other than its formal properties:

Lasker explores the inflections, the innuendoes of hues and geometric forms that represent themselves rather than convey meaning for representing something else. These are works that simply ask us to see. By reducing (or, perhaps, ennobling) a form to its basics – a gray rectangle, perhaps, that glows on a graph grid – then placing beside it a similar but altered shape whose bold colors give it recrudescent life, Lasker wants us to look at what we ignore, or to imagine what we suppress. These are joyous, reasoned, passionate works. They trace moods through something indecipherable – they are, after all, abstractions – but Lasker has a way of anchoring us to them. Sight made tactile, thought made figurative.

== Solo exhibitions ==
- Jonathan Lasker: Painting and Drawing, Thaddaeus Ropac, Paris, 2024.
- Jonathan Lasker: Paintings from Five Decades, Museum of Recent Art (MARe), Bucharest, 2024.
- Jonathan Lasker: Painting and Drawing, Thaddaeus Ropac, Salzburg, 2024.
- The Life of Objects in a Picture, Greene Naftali Gallery, New York, 2023.
- Jonathan Lasker: New Paintings, Thaddaeus Ropac, Paris, 2022.
- Born Yesterday: Drawing into Painting, 1987–2020, Greene Naftali Gallery, New York, 2021.
- Jonathan Lasker: Paintings and Studies for Paintings, curated by Sid Sachs, Rosenwald-Wolf Gallery, University of the Arts, Philadelphia, 2019.
- Jonathan Lasker: Paintings 2001–2014, Musée d'art Moderne et Contemporain de Saint-Étienne Métropole, Saint Etienne, France, 2015.
- Portland Art Museum, Portland, Oregan, 2008–2009.
- Jonathan Lasker: Paintings, Drawings, Studies 1977–2003, Museo Nacional Centro de Art Reina Sofía, Madrid; K-20 Kunstsammlung Nordrhein-Westfalen, Düsseldorf, 2003.
- Jonathan Lasker: Selective Identity – Paintings from the 1990s, Contemporary Art Museum St. Louis, St. Louis; The Power Plant Contemporary Art Gallery at Harbourfront Centre, Toronto; Rose Art Museum at Brandeis University, Waltham, Massachusetts; Birmingham Museum of Art, Birmingham, Alabama, 1999–2000.
- Jonathan Lasker: Paintings 1977–1997, Kunsthalle Bielefeld, Bielefeld, Germany; Stedelijk Museum, Amsterdam; Kunstverein St. Gallen im Kunstmuseum, St. Gallen, Switzerland,1997–1998.
- Witte de With Center for Contemporary Art, Rotterdam, Netherlands, 1993.
- Institute of Contemporary Art, University of Pennsylvania, Philadelphia, 1992.

== Collections ==
Lasker's work is included in numerous private and public collections around the world. Museums that have Lasker's work in their collections include:

- Albright-Knox Art Gallery, Buffalo, New York
- Birmingham Museum of Art, Birmingham, Alabama
- The Broad, Los Angeles, CA
- Casino Luxembourg, Forum for Contemporary Art, Luxembourg
- Centre Pompidou, Paris, France
- Corcoran Gallery of Art, Washington, DC
- Los Angeles County Museum of Art, Los Angeles, California
- La Fondacion Caja de Pensiones, Madrid
- High Museum, Atlanta, Georgia
- Hirshhorn Museum and Sculpture Garden, Washington, DC
- MIT List Visual Arts Center, Cambridge, Massachusetts
- Museum of Contemporary Art, Los Angeles, California
- The Museum of Fine Arts, Houston, Texas
- Museum of Modern Art, New York, New York
- Moderna Museet, Stockholm, Sweden
- Centro Andaluz de Arte Contempoáneo, Seville, Spain
- Museum Ludwig, Cologne, Germany
- Whitney Museum of American Art, New York, New York
- Wichita Art Museum, Wichita, Kansas
