= Comporta (civil parish) =

- Civil parish
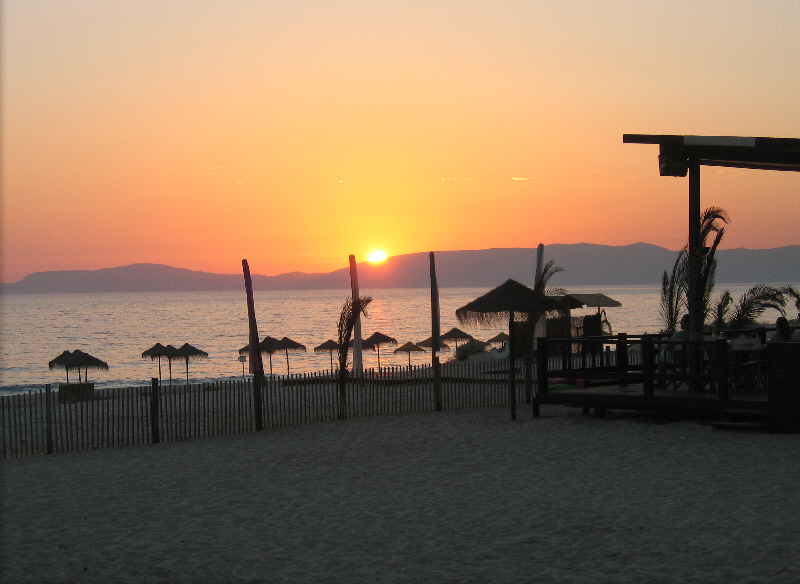
- The white sand beaches of Carresqueira, along the Sado estuary

- Location in Portugal
- Coordinates: 38.380°N 8.786°W
- Country: Portugal
- Region: Alentejo
- Intermunic. comm.: Alentejo Litoral
- District: Setúbal
- Municipality: Alcácer do Sal

Area
  - Total: 150.54 km^{2} (58.12 sq mi)
- Elevation: 24 m (79 ft)

Population (2011)
  - Total: 1,268
  - Density: 8.423/km^{2} (21.82/sq mi)
- Time zone: UTC+00:00 (WET)
  - Summer (DST): UTC+01:00 (WEST)
- Postal code: 7580
- Area code: 265
- Patron: São Pedro

Comporta is a freguesia ("civil parish") and village in the municipality of Alcácer, in the old district of Setúbal, in continental Portugal, located at the base of the Tróia Peninsula, along the Sado estuary. The population in 2011 was 1,268, in an area of 150.54 km^{2}. It is part of, and the namesake of, the larger Comporta Coastal region.

== History ==
During the time of the Companhia das Lezírias, Comporta was a small agglomeration of 65 impoverished cabanas around a principal estate.

Until 1989, Comporta was a part of the parish of Santa Maria do Castelo.

== Geography ==
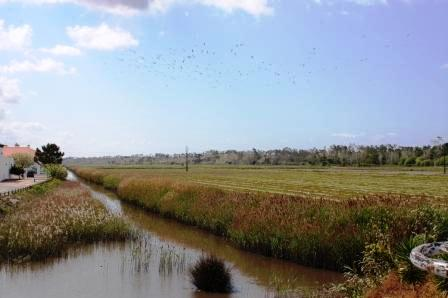
The rice fields in Comporta: the cultivation of rice has been an integral part of the economy

Comporta Beach

Located along the peninsula of Tróia on the southern margin of the Sado River, the region is characterized by a number of rice fields under cultivation. In addition, its vicinity within the Sado estuary makes the region a habitat of many species of terrestrial and marine birds, including the grey herons, storks and flamingos.

While Comporta is the administrative centre of the parish, there are several small population concentrations (localities, places or villages) throughout; they include: Brejo da Carregueira, Brejo da Carregueira de Cima, Cambado, Comporta, Figueiral Moitinha, Murta, Possanco, Torre, Torroal and Carrasqueira.

== Economy ==
The principal economic activities in the area include fishing, agriculture, small industry associated with rice harvesting for local and migrant workers, in addition to many tertiary services (hotels, bakeries, civil construction, sawmilling, carpentry and small commercial shops). Tourism has become an increasingly important part of this mix, with new investments into the area: the main village of Comporta has developed into an upmarket holiday destination, due to its tourist-friendly beaches and the many restaurants and boutiques.

Commercial rice cultivation was an important part of the economy since 1925, providing to many factories, although over the years these facilities have been closed and the management of the lands transferred to Lisbon or Ribatejo. The "Comporta" brand, promoted by the Herdade da Comporta since 1925, gave way to new packaging under the Alcacer do Sal or Coruche brands. The rice industry has become less of an integral part of the community, and only the Arroz Ceifeira brand, managed by João Duarte Correia (an ex-miller in the Torrinha factory) continues to sell, promoting the local industry.

== Architecture ==
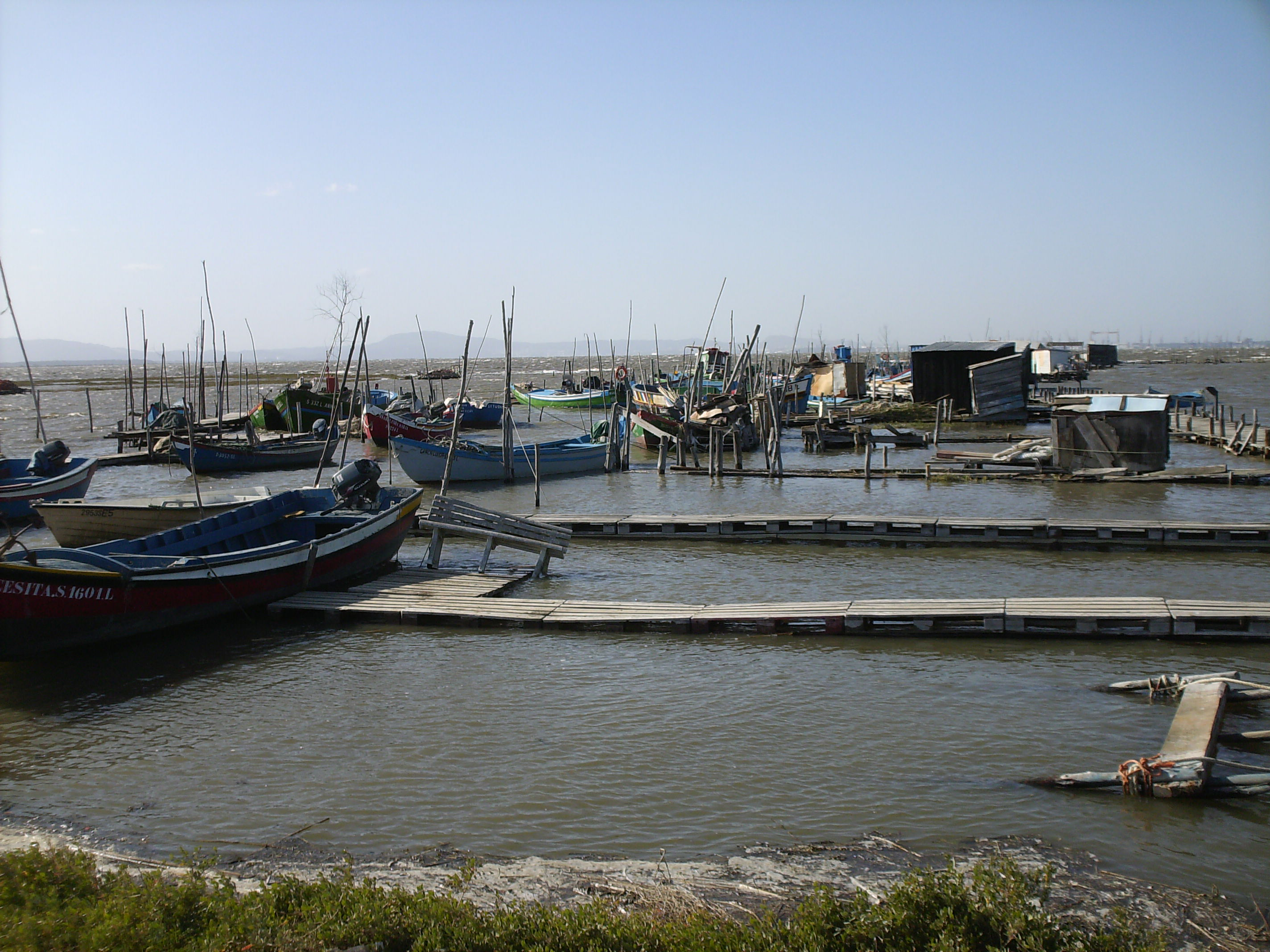
The historical dock in Carrasqueira, used for many years by local fishermen

=== Civic ===
- Residence of Estorno (Portuguese: Casa Tradicional da Carrasqueira/Casa de Estorno), this type of home was divided into two spaces (a kitchen-dining area and bedroom) with dirt floors (the bedroom covered in wood-floors) and kiln in brick.
- Fountain of Abóbada (Portuguese: Fonte da Abóbada)
- Port of Carrasqueira (Portuguese: Porto de pesca palafítico da Carrasqueira), located within the Sado Estuary Nature Reserve (Portuguese: Reseva Natural do Estuário do Sado) the artesnal fishing port, the Port of Carrasqueira is known for the wooden dock, built on stilts (a municipal heritage due to its method of construction, extension and important contribution to the local landscape), along with the Concheiros do Paleolítico.

=== Religious ===
- Church of São Pedro (Portuguese: Igreja Paroquial da Comporta/Igreja de São Pedro)
- Chapel of São Pedro (Portuguese: Capela de São Pedro)

== Culture ==
Portuguese handicrafts, particularly miniature boats of wood, quilts, needlework and embroidery are common in many of the villages.

Although the patron saint is Saint Peter, the residents of Comporta continue to celebrate other religious festivals associated with the popular saints, in addition to the Festival do Arroz (Rice Festival), which celebrates the founding of the parish. Every two years the village of Carrasqueira is the site of the Festival da Batata Doce (Sweet Potato Festival), as well as being the annual meeting-place for motorcyclists. On the second Friday of each month, there is a traditional market, in which the inhabitants sell handicrafts, food and other goods.

The major associations in the parish are the Clube Recreativo da Herdade da Comporta (Recreational Club of the Herdade da Comporta), the Grupo Desportivo da Carrasqueira (Sport Group of Carrasqueira), the Grupo Motard Rateres do Sado (Motorcycle Club of the Sado) and the Associação de Moradores dos Brejos (Residents Association of Brejos) .

In addition to the popular bolinhos de arroz (rice balls), the traditional culinary plate in Comporta is beans with rice and linguiça, in addition to the popular bacon, chouriço and coriander cooked in an earthen pot over woodfire, or the arroz de bacalhau (rice cod), ensopado de enguias (eel soup/stew) and massa de peixe (fish pasta).

== Tourism ==
=== Beaches ===
Comporta is famous for its beaches and its mild climate during the summer. Comporta beach has white sand and a blue sea. The wide stretch of sand, the parking lot and access via a dirt road that runs north-south from the EN 261 before reaching Herdade da Comporta - making it a known beach in the region. For a long time, it was the place chosen by the people of inland Alentejo to go bathing. Today, due to the Lisbon-Madrid highway, it is the Spaniards who have made Comporta one of their places of choice. This beach has been awarded the Blue Flag.

In 2015, the Sal restaurant on Pego beach in Comporta was considered the best beach bar/restaurant in the world by the readers of Traveler magazine.

== See also ==
- Comporta Coast
