= Claire Tabouret =

French artist (born 1981)

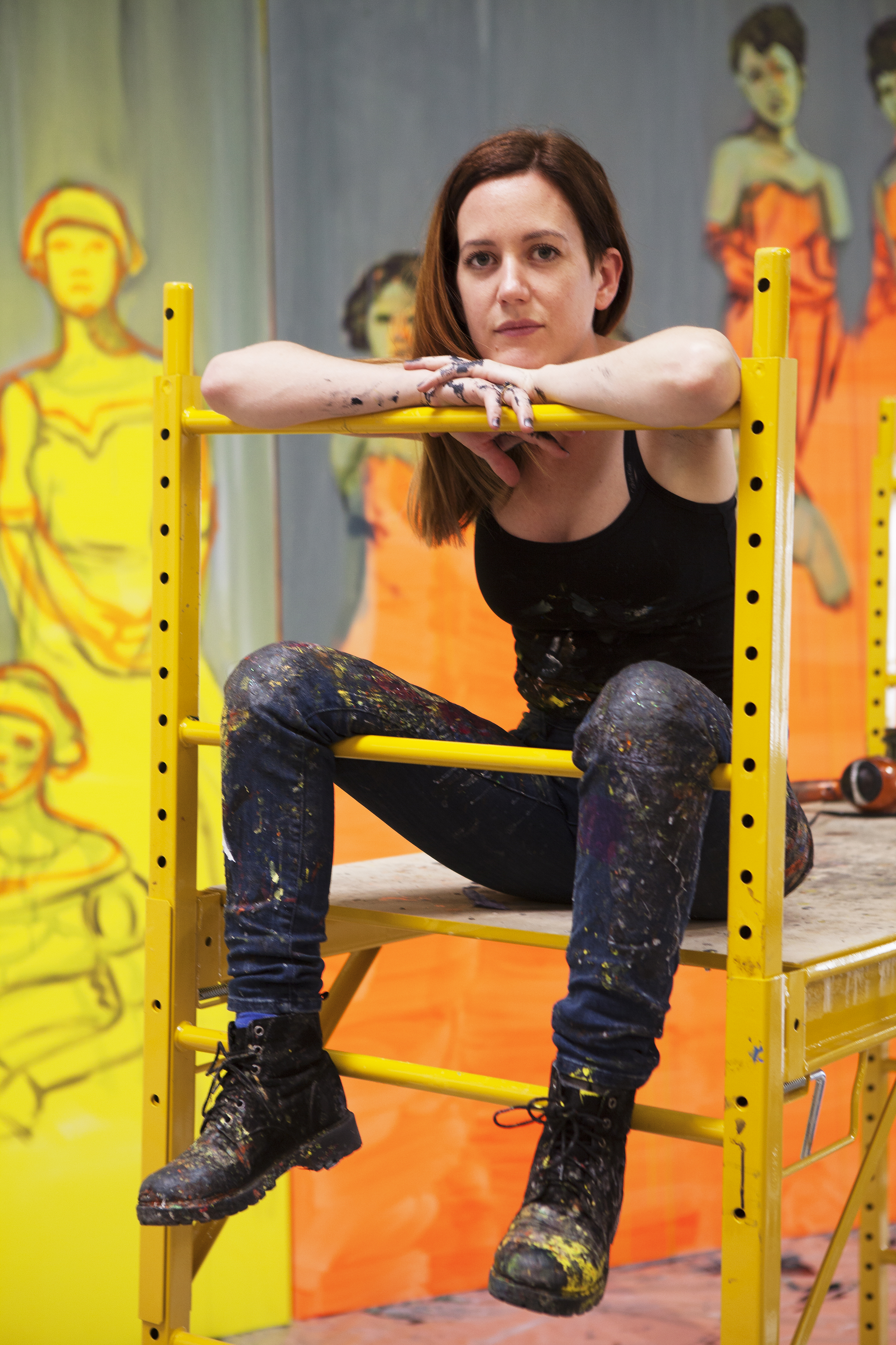
Claire Tabouret by Logan White

Claire Tabouret (born 1981) is a French artist based in Los Angeles, California, United States. She works with figurative subject matter, using loose expressive brushstrokes in a broad palette, mimicking both artificial and natural hues.

== Work ==
Tabouret's 'Makeup' (2015-ongoing) depicts young women and girls with their faces smeared with cosmetics. The smeared makeup references a child's first attempts at painting.

In 2017 Tabouret exhibited alongside Yoko Ono in the exhibit 'One Day I Broke a Mirror' at Villa De Medici. For the exhibit, she made paintings of groups of women, seated and looking forward, described as warriors, adventuresses, and conquerors.

Also in 2017, Tabouret painted the interior of a chapel on the estate of Pierre Yovanovitch, covering the interior walls of the chapel with a crowd of children in costumes.

For a two part exhibit in both Picasso's studio and Almine Rech Gallery, she painted a series using the subject matter of wrestlers and couples dancing, the struggle and harmony of the two subjects relating to her own feelings about the famous painter whose space she was responding to.

In 2021, Tabouret was included in the exhibition ‘Present Generations’ at the Columbus Museum of Art. The exhibition consisted of works to be donated to the museum in order to inaugurate the Columbus Museum of Art's Scantland Collection. Also in 2021, works by Tabouret were acquired by the Institute of Contemporary Art Miami and the Dallas Museum of Art.

Tabouret's work was included in the 2022 exhibition Women Painting Women at the Modern Art Museum of Fort Worth.

In December 2024, Tabouret won a competition to design new stained glass windows as part of the restoration of Notre-Dame de Paris. The new stained glass windows would replace existing stained glass windows by Eugène-Emmanuel Viollet-le-Duc that were installed as part of Viollet-le-Duc’s major restoration of Notre-Dame between 1844 and 1864. The existing windows were not damaged in the 2019 fire that damaged Notre-Dame’s spire and roof. Tabouret's designs were unveiled at her 2025 solo exhibition In a Single Breath [D’un seul souffle in French] at the Grand Palais. The exhibition featured “life-size models, sketches and preparatory work for the six stained-glass windows she created for Notre-Dame Cathedral in Paris” and was presented with Eva Jospin's Grottesco and were billed together as Eva Jospin, Grottesco·Claire Tabouret, D’un seul souffle.

From 31 January – 25 May 2026, the Museum Voorlinden exhibited Weaving Waters, Weaving Gestures, the “first major museum-wide retrospective” of her work.

== Exhibitions ==
- The Dance of Icarus, Yuz Museum, Shanghai, China 2017
- I am Crying because you are not crying, Château de Boisgeloup, Gisors, France, 2018
- La Ronde, Musée des Beaux-Arts de Rouen, Rouen, France, 2020
- Mirrors and Reflections, Jordan Schnitzer Museum of Art, Eugene, Oregon, 2020
