= Pierre Yovanovitch =

French interior designer

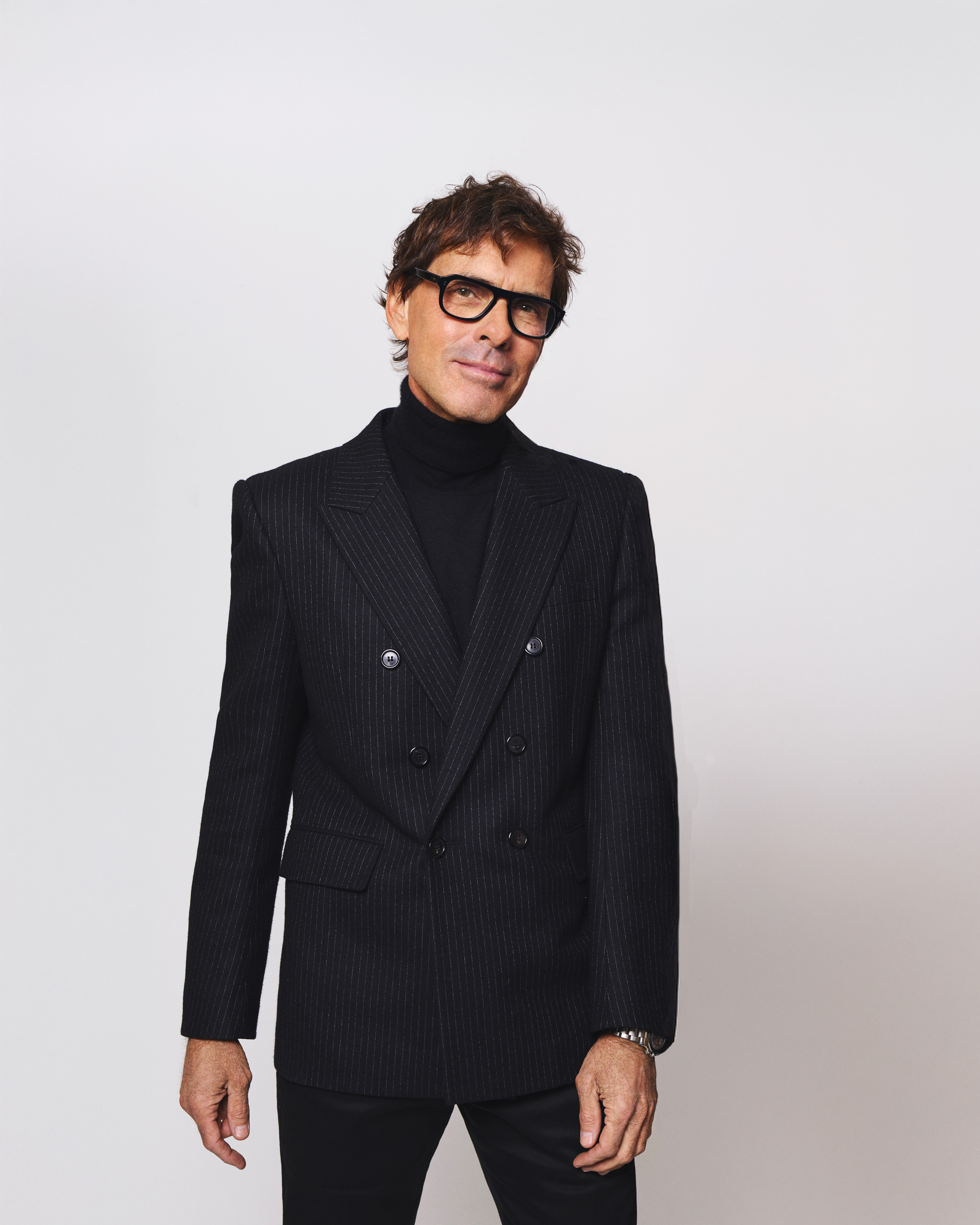
- Born: Nice, France
- Occupations: Architect, interior designer
- Website: https://www.pierreyovanovitch.com/en/pierre-yovanovitch-home-en

Pierre Yovanovitch is a French interior architect and furniture designer, who established his practice in Paris in 2001.

In 2024, the Pierre Yovanovitch Group acquired the French furniture manufacturer d'Argentat and its subsidiary, ECART International, founded by Andrée Putman.

== Pierre Yovanovitch Mobilier ==
Pierre Yovanovitch Mobilier was founded by Pierre Yovanovitch in 2021, twenty years after establishing his interior architecture practice. The brand reflects Yovanovitch's tailored design approach, offering luxury furniture and lighting with an emphasis on craftsmanship, quality materials, and sustainable sourcing.

Pierre Yovanovitch Mobilier draws on Yovanovitch's experience in custom interior design and the success of his furniture collections at R & Company gallery in New York in 2017 and 2019. The brand is committed to high standards, using locally sourced wood, natural fibers, hand-blown glass, and non-toxic adhesives.

Pierre Yovanovitch Mobilier collaborates with skilled artisans in France and Switzerland, who apply traditional crafting techniques. Some of these artisans are recognized with the prestigious 'Meilleur ouvrier de France' award for their expertise.

== Early years ==
Pierre Yovanovitch was born and raised in Nice, France. His father, of Yugoslavian descent, was an industrialist, and his mother was French, with roots in Algeria prior to its independence. The lack of family heirlooms during his upbringing influenced his desire to create his own legacy through design.

As a child, Yovanovitch developed a strong connection to music, playing the piano and attending the Nice Conservatoire. At the age of twenty, he attended a performance by Jessye Norman at the Salle Pleyel, which ignited his passion for opera—a lasting source of inspiration in his work.

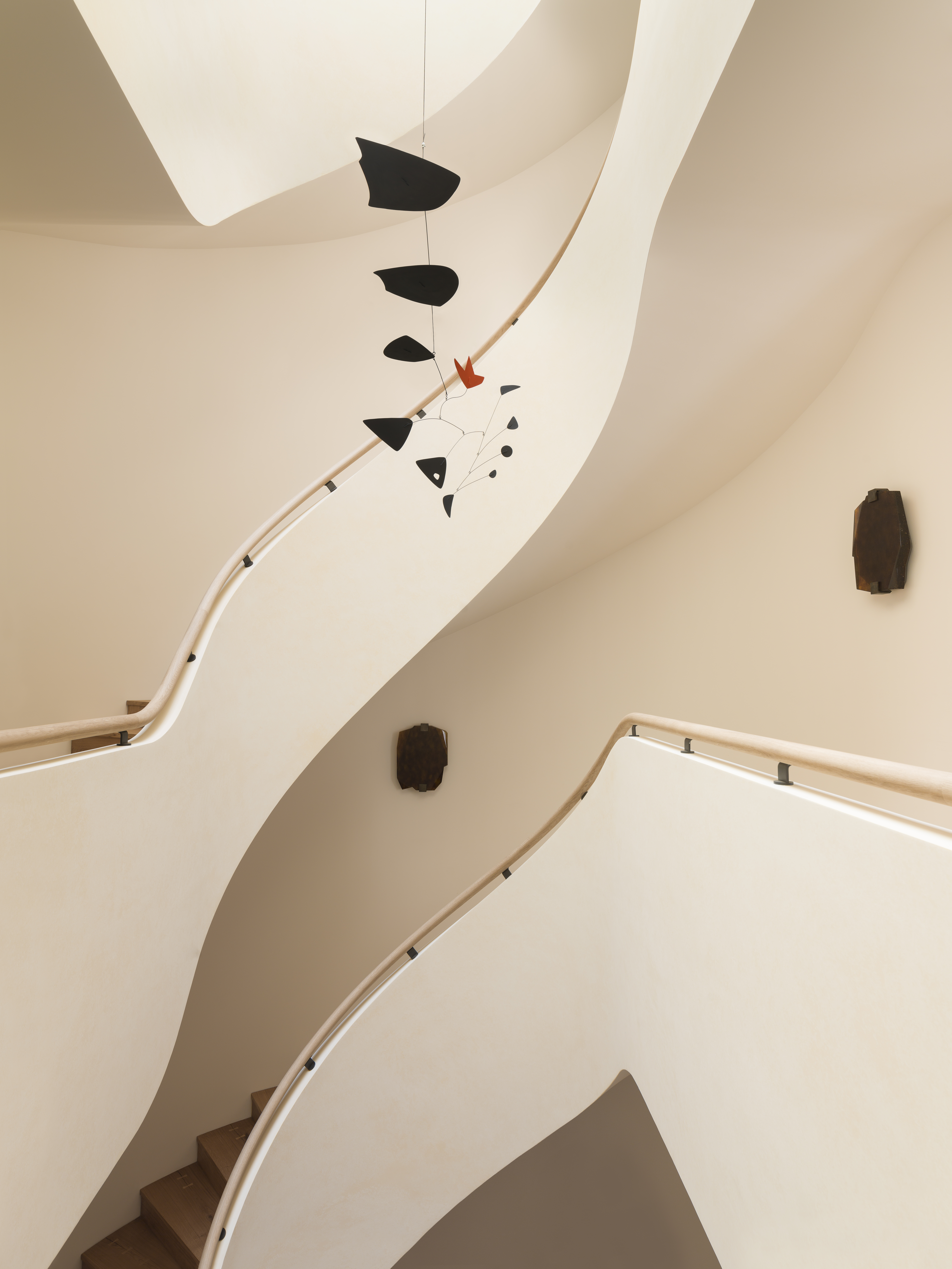
Pierre Yovanovitch Furniture New York (2023)

== Pierre Cardin ==
After completing high school in Nice and attending business school in Paris, Pierre Yovanovitch was preparing for military service when he met designer Pierre Cardin, who offered him an apprenticeship. Yovanovitch worked for Cardin for eight years, first as a menswear license manager for Benelux and later as a menswear designer.

After eight years designing prêt-à-porter, Yovanovitch shifted his focus to interior design.

He began his interior design career by transforming his own Paris apartment, which led to requests from friends to design their homes. This informal start eventually grew into his successful interior architecture practice.

== Style and influences ==
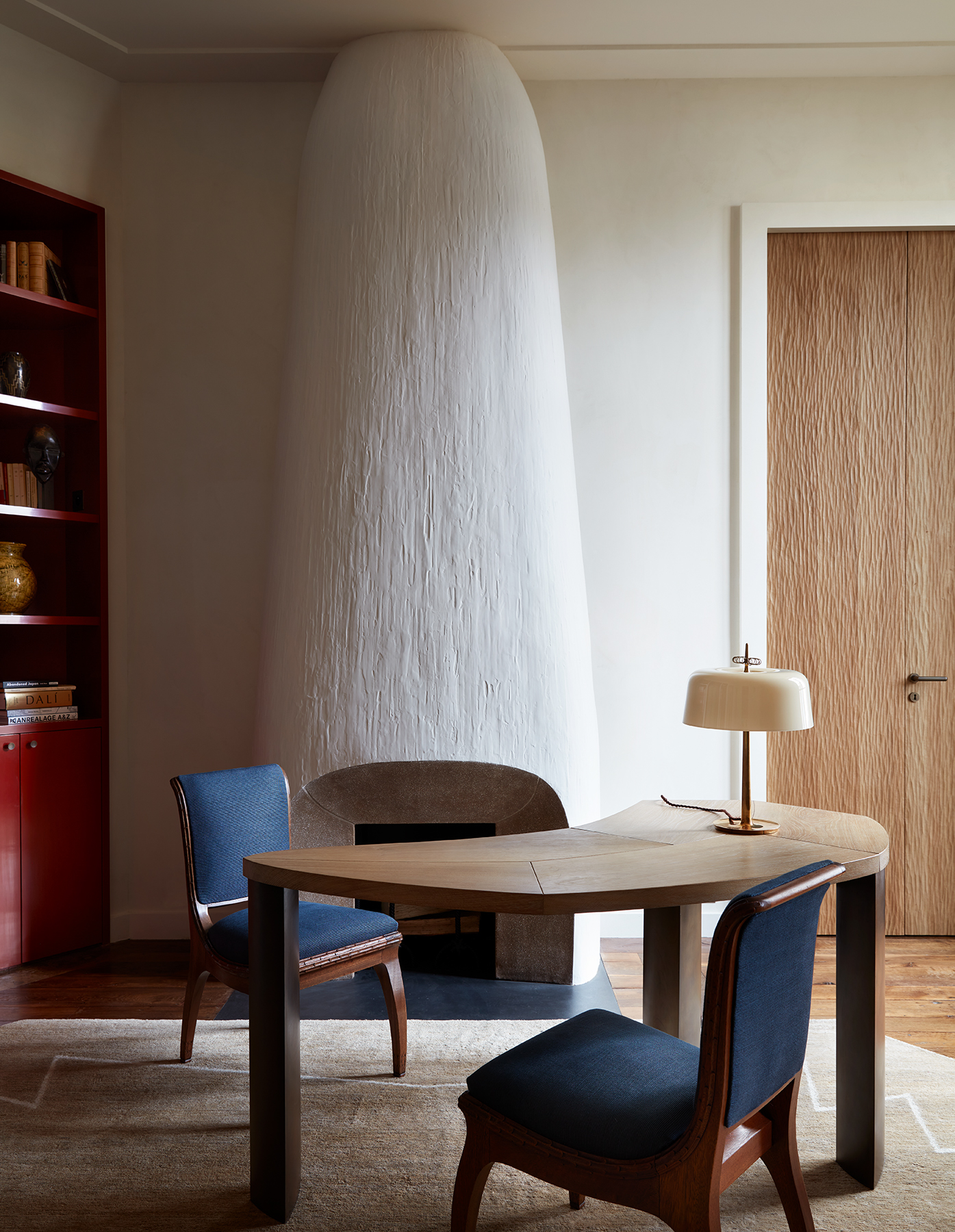
Parisian residence designed by Pierre Yovanovitch (2022)

=== Historic Design ===
From the outset of his career, Pierre Yovanovitch drew inspiration from the Swedish Grace design movement of the 1920s, particularly the work of Axel Einar Hjorth and Gunnar Asplund, as well as early 20th-century American designers such as Paul László, Terrence Harold Robsjohn-Gibbings, James Mont, and Harvey Probber. These influences, combined with his playful and narrative-driven approach, helped define his distinctive aesthetic.

Yovanovitch's passion for contemporary art is central to his design work. As a collector, he incorporates contemporary pieces and commissions both established and emerging artists, including Claire Tabouret, Tadashi Kawamata, Alicja Kwade, and Daniel Buren, among others. His early clients were art collectors, which naturally integrated contemporary art into his interior projects.

=== Contemporary Art ===
Yovanovitch's passion for contemporary art is central to his design work. As a collector, he incorporates contemporary pieces and commissions both established and emerging artists, including Claire Tabouret, Tadashi Kawamata, Alicja Kwade, and Daniel Buren, among others. His early clients were art collectors, which naturally integrated contemporary art into his interior projects.

=== Storytelling ===
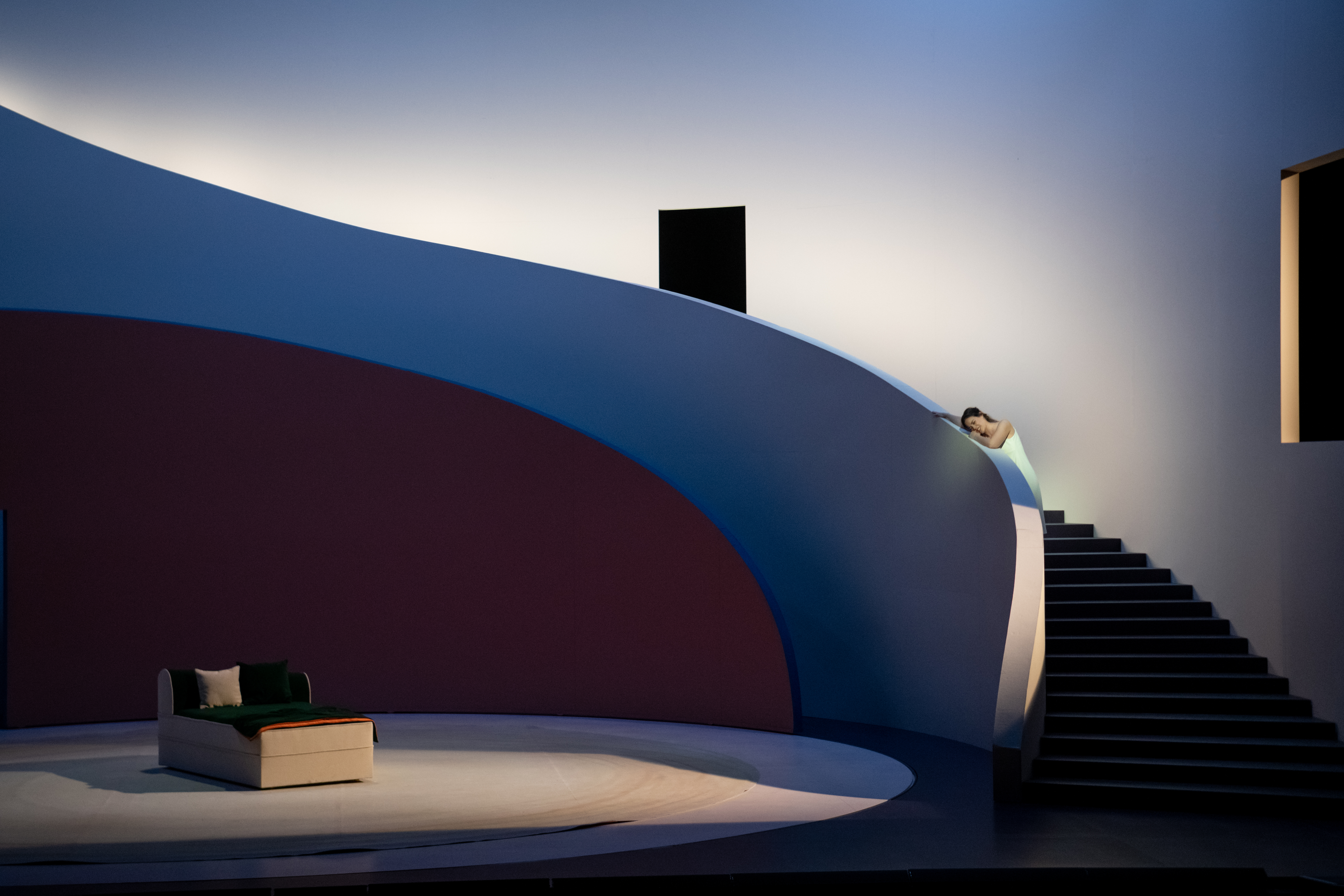
Scenography of the Opera Rigoletto at the Theater Basel in Switzerland (2023)

Pierre Yovanovitch has a strong connection to storytelling, influenced by his love for opera. In January 2023, he worked with Vincent Huguet on the Basel Opera's production of Rigoletto, which was a significant moment for him. Yovanovitch sees a clear link between storytelling and designing spaces, and he incorporates this approach into his residential projects, aiming to create spaces that reflect a narrative.

== Château de Fabrègues ==
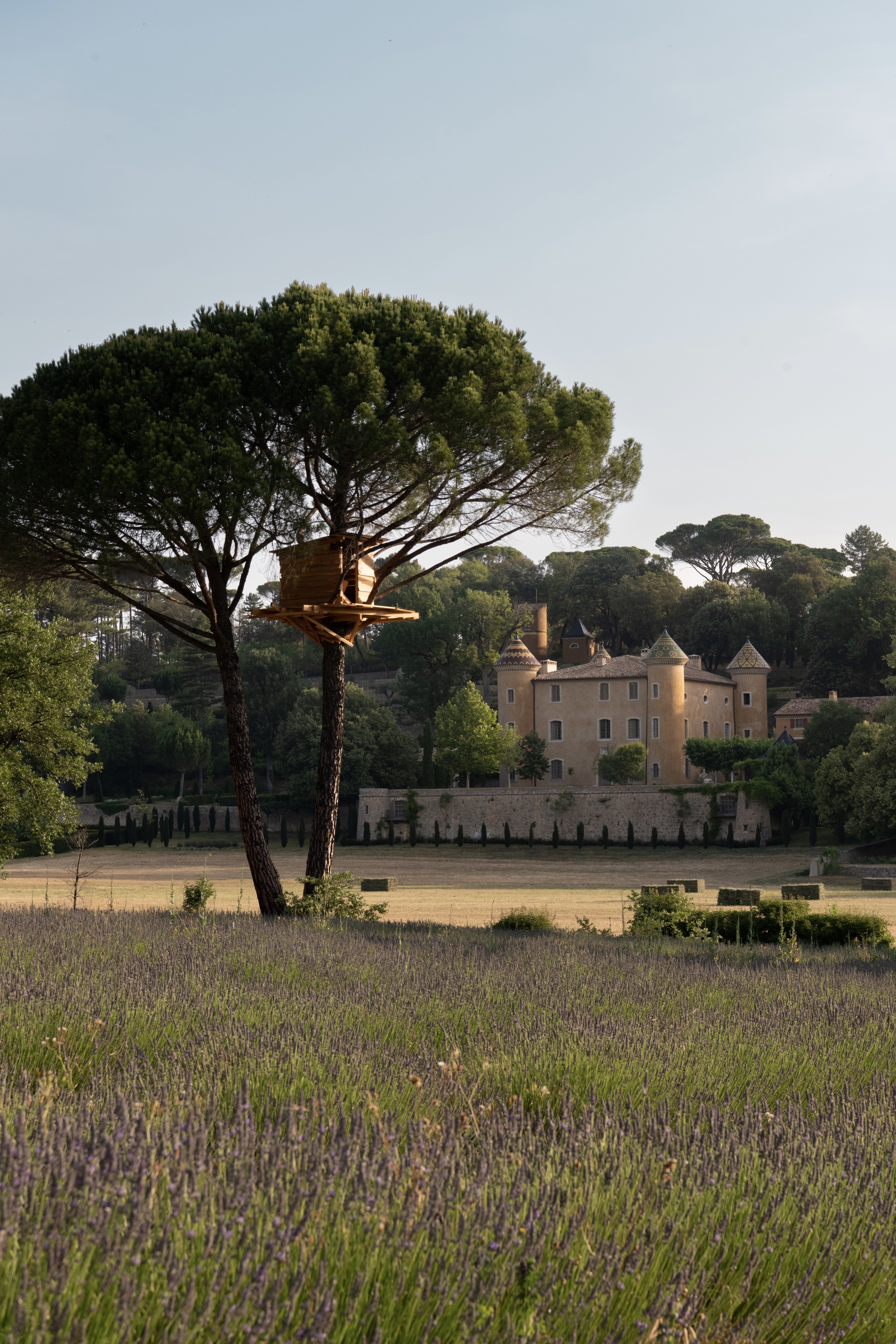
Fabrègue Castle (2022)

Pierre Yovanovitch's home, Château de Fabrègues, is situated on the northern edge of the Var region in Provence and was originally built in the early 17th century by the Fabrègues family. Yovanovitch often draws inspiration from the property and its natural surroundings for his work, particularly in his choice of materials.

After purchasing the chateau in 2009, Yovanovitch undertook extensive renovations while preserving the building's historical character. Today, the chateau reflects his creative vision, featuring site-specific contemporary art commissions and serving as an example of his approach to interior design.

== Pierre Yovanovitch Group and D'Argentat and ECART International ==
For over a decade, the Pierre Yovanovitch Group and the d'Argentat factory have collaborated, sharing a commitment to furniture and French craftsmanship. In March 2024, this partnership evolved as the Pierre Yovanovitch Group acquired d'Argentat. Along with this acquisition, the group also took ownership of d'Argentat's subsidiary, Ecart International, a well-known editor of signature furniture.
