= Thaddaeus Ropac =

Austrian art dealer

- Born: January 16, 1960 (age 66); Klagenfurt, Austria
- Occupation: Gallerist
- Website: https://ropac.net/

Thaddaeus Ropac (born 16 January 1960) is an Austrian gallerist specializing in international contemporary art. He founded the Galerie Thaddaeus Ropac in 1981, and represents today more than 60 artists with his seven international galleries: Salzburg Villa Kast, Salzburg Halle, Paris Le Marais, Paris Pantin, London Ely House (Mayfair), Seoul Fort Hill, and Milan Palazzo Belgioso.

== Early Life ==
Thaddaeus Ropac was born in Klagenfurt, Austria, and was raised in Carinthia, Austria's southernmost state. He initially unearthed his passion for art on a school trip to the Kunsthistorisches Museum (Vienna Museum of Art) 1978, and by attending workshops with the Austrian sculpture artist Karl Prantl (1979–1980). After finishing an apprenticeship in retail trade in Lienz, Austria (1978–1980), he founded his first gallery in 1981 and simultaneously went on to work at a first internship with Joseph Beuys for the already famous artist's exhibitions in Berlin 1981–1982.

He spent also some time during the early eighties as freelancer in New York City. While in New York, Ropac became acquainted with young American artists such as Andy Warhol, Jean-Michel Basquiat, Keith Haring and Robert Mapplethorpe, which he started to exhibit as one of the first gallerists doing so in Central Europe.

== Galleries ==
=== History ===
Ropac opened his first gallery in Lienz in 1981, at the age of 21, followed by a second one in Salzburg in 1983, at the age of 23, which later would move in 1989 to Salzburg’s Villa Kast.

He founded a third gallery in Paris Le Marais nine years later, in 1990. Launched with just one exhibition room, Ropac's space today stretches across three floors on Rue Debelleyme in Paris's Marais neighborhood.

In 2012 he opened an additional gallery in Paris Pantin, the northeast edge of Paris. Here he renovated a 1900 former heating systems factory in Pantin, in the east of Paris, and transformed its eight buildings to make exhibition halls, a performance centre, a library/archive, a viewing room and artists' studios. Ropac wanted to create a magical space to show monumental artworks, which should be accessible from Paris by metro.

Ropac opened an additional gallery in the historic Ely House, the former residence of the Bishop of Ely in Mayfair, London, in Spring 2017, followed by a gallery in Seoul's Fort Hill building in Autumn 2021, and most recently, a gallery in Milan's Palazzo Belgioso in Autumn 2026.

=== Activities ===
Today his galleries represent some of the most important Austrian artists, such as Erwin Wurm, Hubert Scheibl, Gerwald Rockenschaub and Arnulf Rainer, as well as significant international artists including Georg Baselitz, Alex Katz, andAnselm Kiefer, among others.

The gallery organizes extensive solo and group exhibitions, often accompanied by comprehensive publications, not only in its own premises, but also in collaboration with major international museums and other non-commercial art institutions. Between 2005 and 2011, in partnership with the Robert Mapplethorpe Foundation, Ropac asked Hedi Slimane, Robert Wilson, and Sofia Coppola to act as guest curators and to select a series of the foundation's images for three gallery shows.

The Galerie Thaddaeus Ropac is present at all major contemporary art fairs including, the Armory Show in New York, the Art Basel fairs in Basel, Miami and Hong Kong, Frieze Art Fair in London and New York and the Foire Internationale d'Art Contemporain in Paris.

== Personal life ==
=== Donations ===
In May 2008, the Österreichische Galerie Belvedere in Vienna received 17 works of art by Julius Deutschbauer, Walter Obholzer, Gerwald Rockenschaub, Hubert Scheibl and Erwin Wurm, among others, from Ropac's personal collection. In November 2009, the MdM (Museum der Moderne) in Salzburg organized an exhibition of the 25 works of art donated by Thaddaeus Ropac to the Museum's permanent collection, which includes works by German, Swiss and Austrian artists.

=== Public offices ===
Ropac is a member of the Advisory Board of the Museum of Contemporary Art in Vienna, of the Museum of Applied Arts (MAK), Vienna, of the European University of Science & Art (Salzburg) and the Salzburg International Festival. Since 2009, Thaddaeus Ropac has been nominated President of the Board of Trustees of the Salzburg Foundation, which encourages the display of art in public places.

=== Recognition ===
In 2005, Ropac was named Officier dans L'Ordre des Arts et des Lettres by French President Jacques Chirac for significant contribution to the arts. In November 2006, he received the gold cross from the Austrian Republic (Verleihung goldenes Verdienstkreuz der Republik Österreich an Thaddaeus Ropac im Bundeskanzleramt). The Chamber of Commerce in Salzburg awarded him the Art and Culture prize in August 2007 (Kunst und Kulturpreis der Salzburger Wirtschaft).

In 2009, the annual chart compiled by the British magazine ArtReview called Thaddaeus Ropac "one of Europe's foremost blue-chip gallerists."

In 2013, Ropac was made Knight of the Legion of Honour in France.

=== Filmography ===
==== Producer ====
Year	Title	Role	Director
2018	Alien Crystal Palace	Producer	Arielle Dombasle
