= Jason Martin (artist) =

British painter (born 1970)

- Born: 2 September 1970 (age 56); Jersey, Channel Islands
- Occupation: Contemporary artist
- Movement: YBA

Jason Martin (born 2 September 1970) is a contemporary painter who lives in London and Portugal. He has a BA from Goldsmiths, University of London (1993). His paintings are often monochromatic or three-dimensional. A contemporary of Damien Hirst and Ian Davenport, he has works in the major collections including the Saatchi Gallery and that of the art dealer Thaddaeus Ropac.

Wrotung of Martin's New York City solo exhibition debut at the Robert Miller Gallery in 1998 in the New York Times critic Roberta Smith remarked...."Seen in their New York gallery debut, Jason Martin's smartly coiffed monochrome paintings have so many precedents, and so much intelligence, economy and all-round optical jazziness they are almost interesting".....
