= North Region, Portugal =

North Region Região do Norte
- NUTS II Region
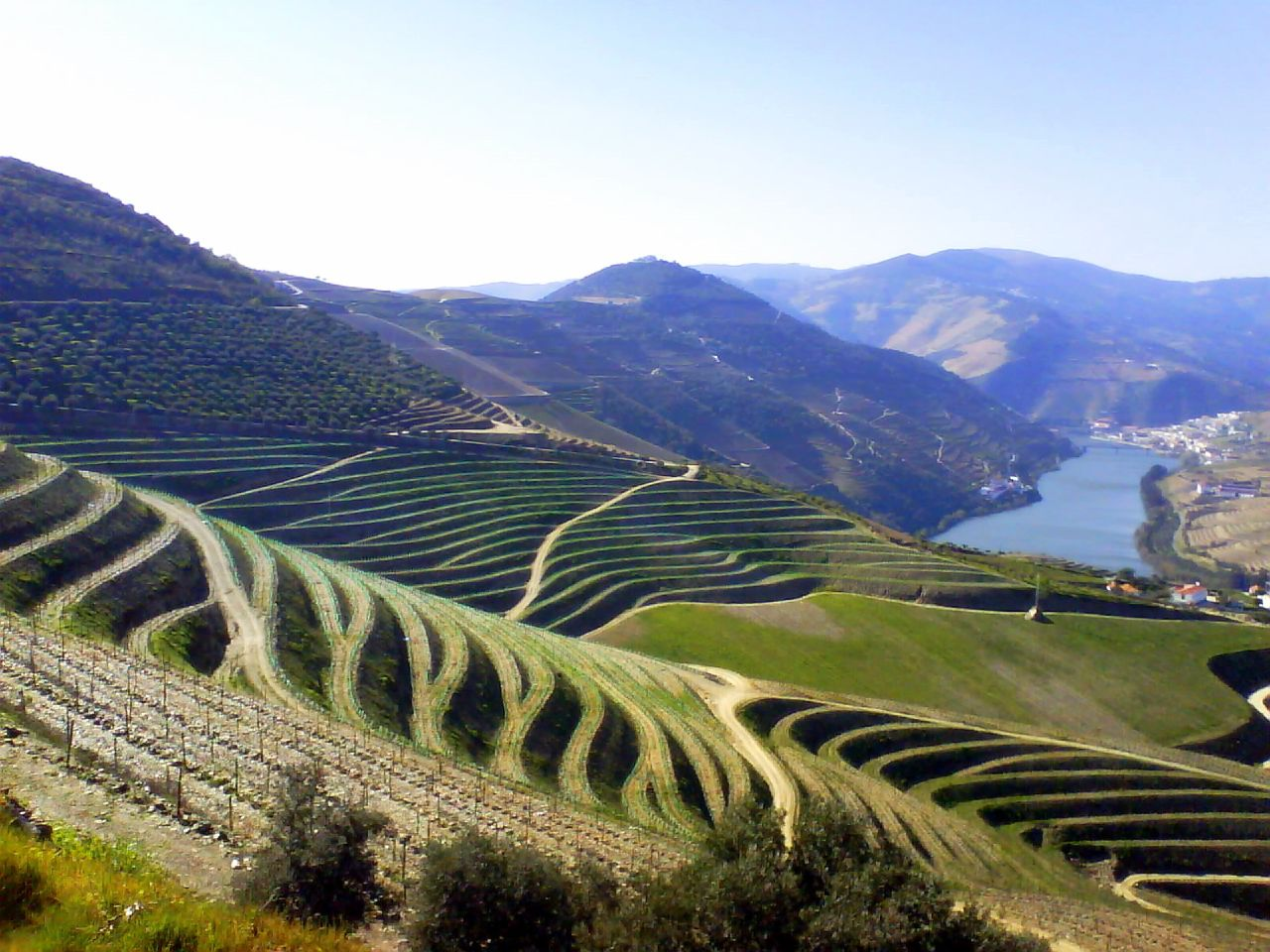
- The Douro Valley, where port wine is produced
- Etymology: norte, Portuguese for north
- Interactive map of North Region
- Country: Portugal
- Region: North
- Capital: Porto

Area
  - Total: 21,278 km^{2} (8,215 sq mi)

Population (2011)
  - Total: 3,689,173 (1st)
  - Density: 173.38/km^{2} (449.05/sq mi)

GDP (nominal)
  - Total: €85.749 billion (2024)
  - Per capita: €23,280 (2024)
- Time zone: UTC+0 (WET)
  - Summer (DST): UTC+1 (WEST)
- HDI (2021): 0.852 very high · 3rd
- NUTS: PT11
- Statistics from INE (2005); geographic detail from Instituto Geográfico Português (2010)

The North Region (Portuguese: Região do Norte [ʁɨʒiˈɐ̃w̃ du ˈnɔɾtɨ]; Mirandese: Region de l Norte [rəʒiˈõŋ d(ə)ɫ ˈnoɾtə]) or Northern Portugal is the most populous region in Portugal, ahead of Lisbon, and the third most extensive by area. The region has 3,576,205 inhabitants according to the 2017 census, and its area is 21,278 kilometres (13,222 mi) with a density of 173 inhabitants per square kilometre. It is one of five regions of Mainland Portugal (NUTS II subdivisions). Its main population center is the urban area of Porto, with about one million inhabitants; it includes a larger political metropolitan region with 1.8 million, and an urban-metropolitan agglomeration with 2.99 million inhabitants, including Porto and neighboring cities, such as Braga, Guimarães and Póvoa de Varzim. The Commission of Regional Coordination of the North (CCDR-N) is the agency that coordinates environmental policies, land-use planning, cities and the overall development of this region, supporting local governments and associations.

Northern Portugal is a culturally varied region. It is a land of dense vegetation and profound historic and cultural wealth. What is now Northern Portugal was first settled by various pre-Celtic and Celtic tribes before being visited by a number of Mediterranean civilizations who traded in its river-mouths, including Greek, Carthaginians, conquest by the Romans, invasion by Germanic peoples, and attacks by the Moors and the Vikings.

== History and culture ==
The region has been inhabited since prehistoric times and is a key area for the understanding of both Atlantic European, Megalithic and Castro cultures. Historically, Northern Portugal with Galicia in Spain, made up the Kingdom of Galicia. In protohistoric times, it was inhabited by Gallaeci tribes, related with the Lusitanians, and it corresponds roughly to Conventus Bracarensis of Roman Gallaecia. The historical Suebic Kingdom (5th-6th centuries AD) had its capital in the now Portuguese city of Braga and most of these migrants and invaders established themselves in Littoral Northern Portugal, when the Roman empire collapsed. After the Islamic conquest of the Iberian Peninsula, a small county was established around the city of Porto, which expanded southwards and became a government, the County of Portugal in the 10th century. This county grew in ambition and it was where Portugal's first king, Dom Afonso Henriques, established the Portuguese kingdom and stated the southward expansion. The Portuguese language evolved from this area, and has a specific modern dialect, Northern Portuguese, taken down south as the Portuguese Kingdom expanded, namely after Afonso Henriques era.

The region has a number of manor-houses and castles featuring coats of arms as an indication of a very intense medieval period. Regional cuisine is renowned and varied offering products such as light wines (vinhos verdes) and rich wines, and a variety of handicrafts that mingles the shine of filigree with the colour of the local embroideries. Northern Portugal is also very rich in folklore and traditions dating back to antiquity.

Galicia and Northern Portugal have been promoting the official candidacy for the recognition of the common intangible cultural heritage by UNESCO. The project is backed by the Galician Government, a number of Galician institutions and associations, together with local and regional governments and institutions in Northern Portugal. The official name is "Candidatura de Património Imaterial Galego-Português".

== Geography ==
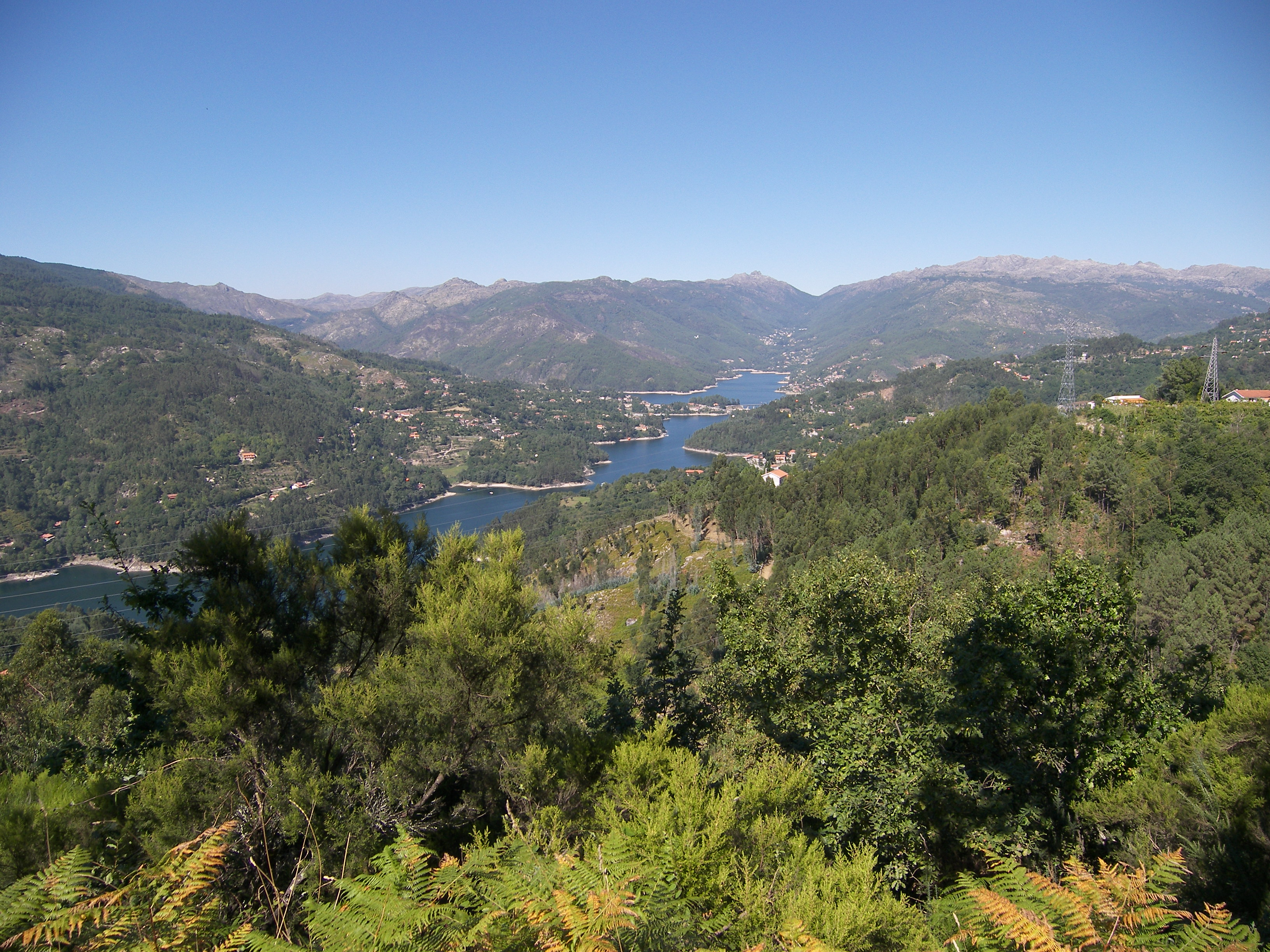
Cávado river in Peneda-Gerês National Park, an area with extreme rainfall

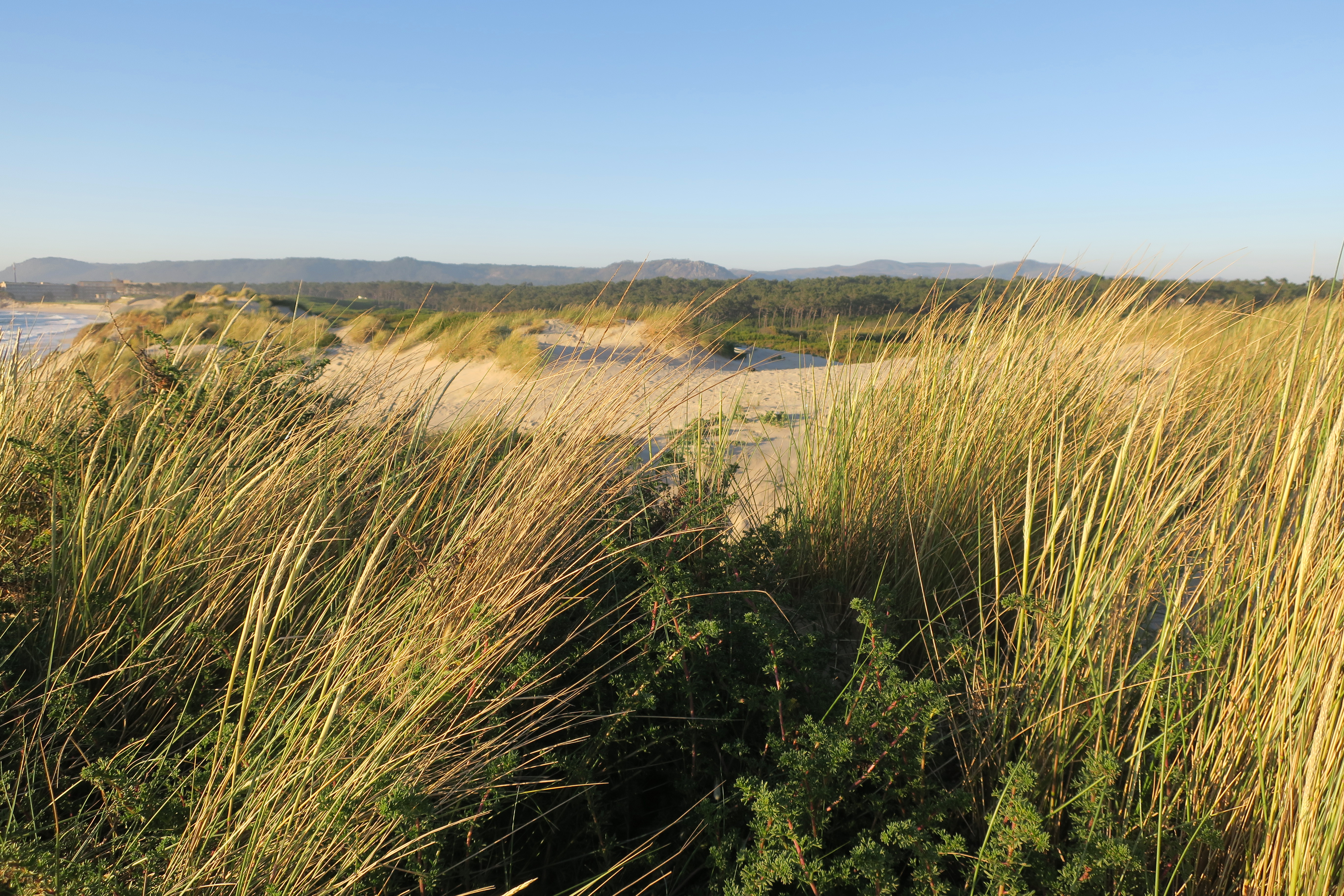
Northern Littoral Natural Park in Esposende

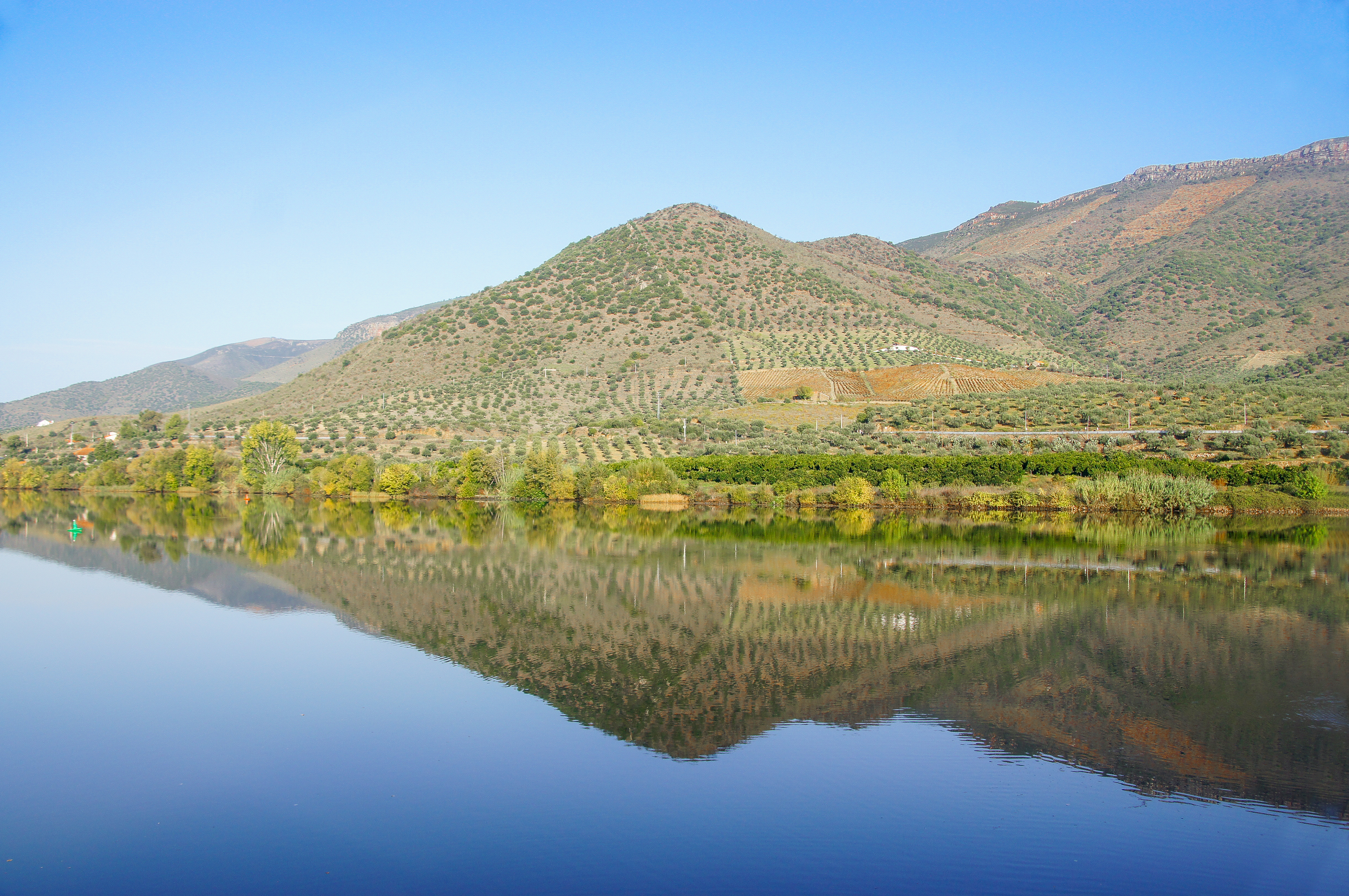
The inland Douro Valley area is exposed to hot summers and seasonal aridity

Northern Portugal is a mountainous region. Its peaks known as serras include Serra do Gerês (1544 m), Peneda (1416 m), Marão (1415 m) and Soajo (1415 m). Some of which forms natural parks: the Peneda-Gerês National Park, Montesinho Natural Park, and the Alvão Natural Park.

The coast, known as the Costa Verde, is a flat strip of land enclosed by sandy beaches and hills, the largest of which is the coastal plain between the Cávado and the Ave rivers. The area is known for the long stretch of picturesque sand dunes which accumulated during the Little Ice Age, part of which is protected in the Northern Littoral Natural Park.

The Minho, Lima, Neiva, Cávado, Ave and the Douro are the most preeminent rivers that flow to the Atlantic Ocean. Inland, the Tâmega is a major tributary which empties in the Douro river. The Douro is the most preeminent river, and one of the most important rivers in the Iberian Peninsula. The Minho river marks the northwestern Portuguese-Spanish border and is the second most important river.

There are four World Heritage Sites: the Alto Douro Wine Region, the Prehistoric Rock-Art Sites in the Côa Valley, the Porto historical Center and the Guimarães historical Center. Throughout the region the rivers, waterfalls, vineyards and fertile plots combine with the ancestral monuments in urban centres.

=== Climate ===
The region has a warm Mediterranean climate (Csb) on the coast and a hot Mediterranean climate (Csa) along the Douro Valley. Northwestern Portugal has temperate summers and mild winters, influenced by the Atlantic Ocean and the diurnal temperature variation rarely reaches 10 °C (50.0 °F), while inland northeastern Portugal has hot summers and cold longer winters, hence continental features, and the diurnal temperature variation can reach 20 °C (68.0 °F).

Rainfall is very irregular as topography and distance from the sea strongly influence precipitation levels, even at short distances. The inland mountainous areas in the northwest around the peaks of Peneda, Gerês and Marão have the highest rainfall in all of Portugal. The Douro valley, however, is among the driest areas in all of Portugal. Some rainy cities include Vila Real, Braga and, on the coast, Viana do Castelo. The coast tends to have balmy weather, high solar irradiance and lower rainfall in a strip from Cape Santo André to the urban area of Porto.

Viana do Castelo

Climate chart (precipitation, max. and min. temperature)
J	F	M	A	M	J	J	A	S	O	N	D
190 15 5	168 16 6	105 18 7	118 19 9	106 21 11	56 25 14	28 26 15	31 26 15	96 25 14	164 21 11	181 17 8	228 15 6
- █ Average max. and min. temperatures in °C
- █ Precipitation totals in mm
Imperial conversion
J	F	M	A	M	J	J	A	S	O	N	D
7.5 58 41	6.6 60 42	4.1 64 45	4.6 65 48	4.2 69 52	2.2 76 57	1.1 79 60	1.2 80 59	3.8 77 57	6.5 70 52	7.1 63 47	9 59 44
- █ Average max. and min. temperatures in °F
- █ Precipitation totals in inches

Pinhão, Alijó

Climate chart (precipitation, max. and min. temperature)
J	F	M	A	M	J	J	A	S	O	N	D
79 12 3	70 15 4	37 19 6	59 20 8	54 24 11	36 29 14	15 33 17	13 33 16	39 29 14	66 23 10	74 17 7	99 13 5
- █ Average max. and min. temperatures in °C
- █ Precipitation totals in mm
Imperial conversion
J	F	M	A	M	J	J	A	S	O	N	D
3.1 53 38	2.7 59 39	1.4 65 42	2.3 68 46	2.1 74 51	1.4 84 57	0.6 91 62	0.5 91 61	1.5 84 57	2.6 73 50	2.9 62 44	3.9 55 40
- █ Average max. and min. temperatures in °F
- █ Precipitation totals in inches

Bragança

Climate chart (precipitation, max. and min. temperature)
J	F	M	A	M	J	J	A	S	O	N	D
96 9 0	75 11 1	44 15 3	62 16 5	70 20 8	39 26 12	20 29 14	18 29 14	45 25 12	85 18 8	86 13 4	119 10 1
- █ Average max. and min. temperatures in °C
- █ Precipitation totals in mm
Imperial conversion
J	F	M	A	M	J	J	A	S	O	N	D
3.8 48 32	3 53 34	1.7 59 38	2.4 61 41	2.8 68 46	1.5 78 54	0.8 85 58	0.7 84 57	1.8 77 53	3.3 65 46	3.4 55 39	4.7 49 34
- █ Average max. and min. temperatures in °F
- █ Precipitation totals in inches

=== Subregions ===
- Alto Minho
- Alto Tâmega
- Ave
- Cávado
- Douro
- Porto Metropolitan Area
- Tâmega e Sousa
- Terras de Trás-os-Montes

== Demography ==
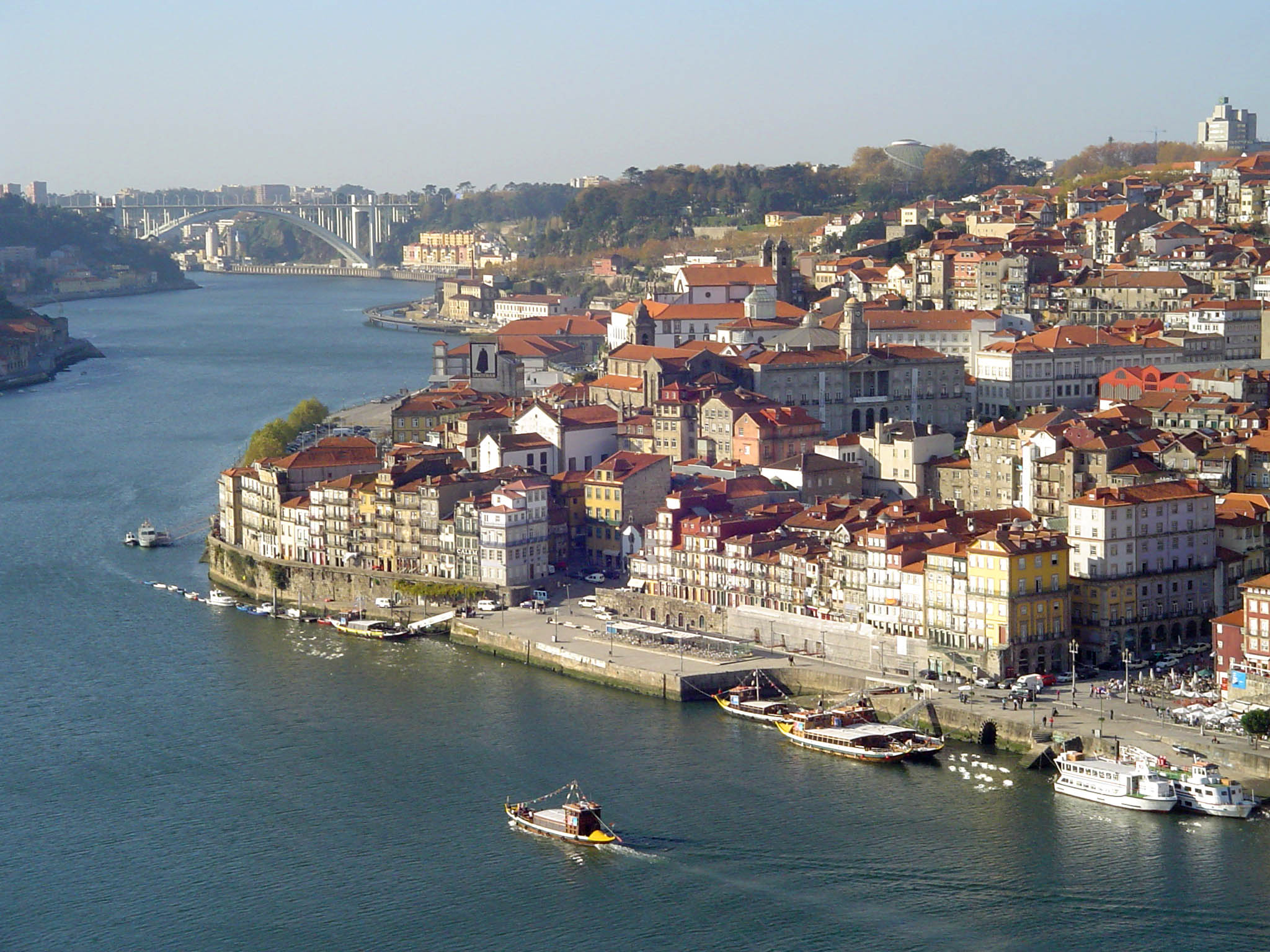
Porto old town

Politically, Northern Portugal is divided into 86 municipalities (municípios), which in turn are subdivided into 1,426 civil parishes (freguesias). The region was subdivided in supramunicipal districts in 1835. Northern Portugal includes the districts of Viana do Castelo, Braga, Porto, Vila Real, and Bragança, and partly the districts of Aveiro, Viseu, and Guarda. The largest municipalities are Vila Nova de Gaia (304,149), Porto (231,962), Braga (193,333), Matosinhos (172,669), Gondomar (164,255), Guimarães (156,852), Santa Maria da Feira (136,720), Maia (134,959), Vila Nova de Famalicão (133.590) and Barcelos (116,777), according to the 2021 Census.

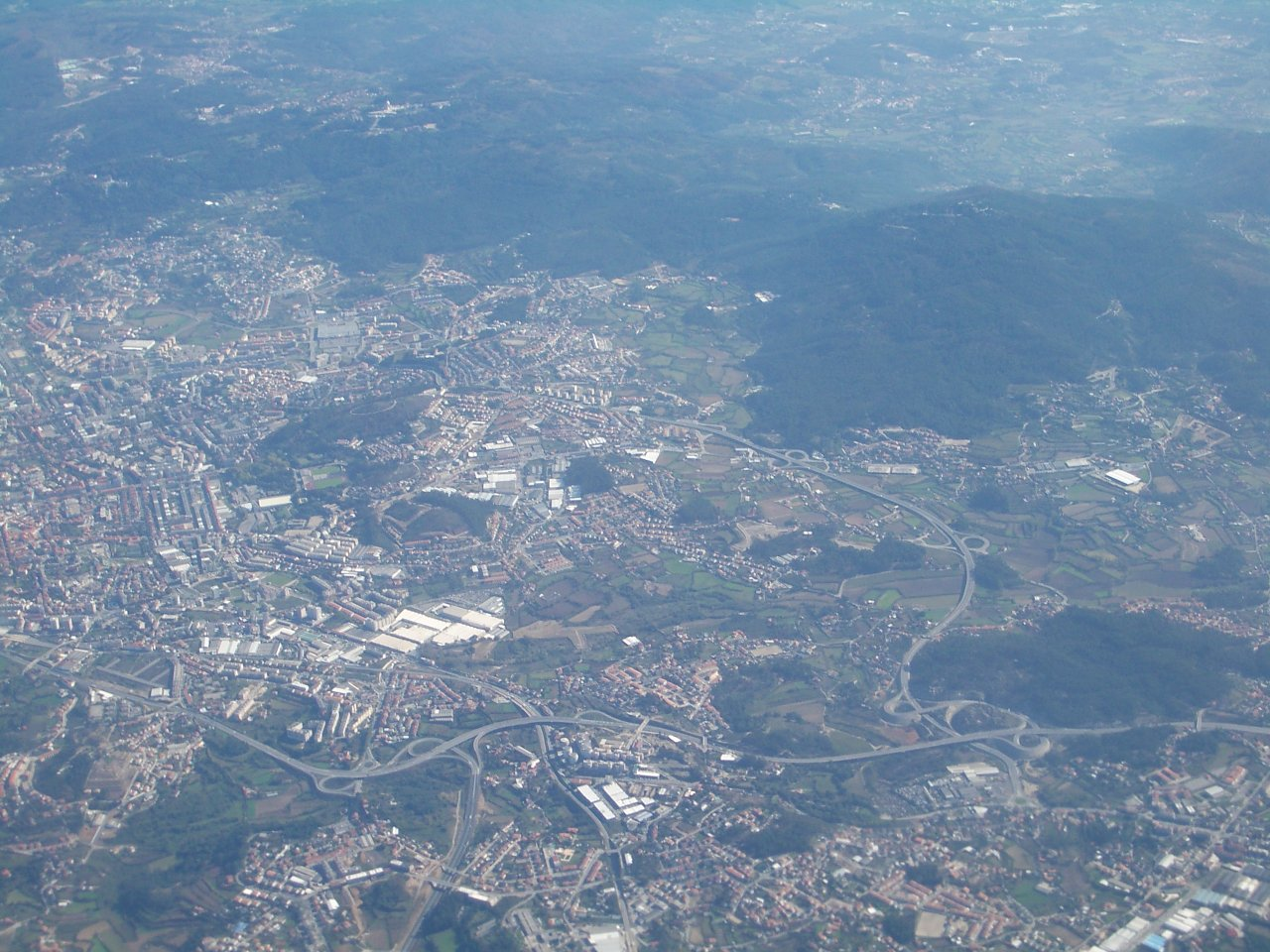
Aerial of Braga showing the typical dispersed settlement of the region

Ignoring municipal subdivisions, the region has one urban area, Greater Porto, with about one million inhabitants, this includes Porto, Vila Nova de Gaia, Matosinhos, Maia and some large suburbs such as Rio Tinto and Ermesinde. There is a significant urban network just above Greater Porto, with about 600,000 inhabitants: the Minho Urban Quadrilateral (Quadrilátero Urbano do Minho), which includes Braga, Guimarães, Vila Nova de Famalicão and Barcelos; and the urban area of Póvoa de Varzim-Vila do Conde, with about 100,000 inhabitants. However, in Northern Portugal these tend to be well-populated with dispersed settlement between the diverse cities of the region. All these human settlements are part of the same polycentric urban-metropolitan agglomeration with 2,99 million inhabitants (2001), alongside the northern Atlantic coast.

The EOCD using the Functional urban areas methology, using 2014 statistics, recognizes one metropolitan area: Porto (1,313,829inh.), one medium sized-urban area Braga (256,427) and three small urban areas: Guimarães (182,433), Viana do Castelo (88,848), and Póvoa de Varzim (63,428).

According to the Portuguese statistics institute, the INE, in the 2011 Census: 4.7% of the population was foreign-born, most arrived from France, Angola, Brazil, Mozambique, Venezuela, Germany, Switzerland, Spain, South Africa, China, and Romania.

== Economy ==
Northern Portugal accounts for about 39% of the national exports and 29% of the national economy. The region was hit hard by the EU's expansion to Eastern Europe, globalization and centralization. Even if once the richest in Portugal and the largest regional economy after Lisbon, it is now the poorest of the 7 NUTS II regions of Portugal, with a GDP per capita of 16,000 euros, converted to 19,500 according to GDP in Purchasing Power Standards or 65% of the European Union average in 2017. It is also the Portuguese NUTS II region with the highest unemployment rate (9.5% as of 2007). Northern Portuguese authorities have intensely promoted tourism as a means to attract external investment and further incomes in rural areas.

GDP at current market prices by NUTS 2 (2024)

Even if it was hit by the Global recession in 2009 and the Eurozone crisis in 2011 and 2012, it was the only region of the whole Iberian Peninsula to increase in GDP per inhabitant in purchasing power standards (PPS) in relation to the EU-28 average, by NUTS 2 regions, between 2007 and 2015. Also one of the few regions in Western Europe to do so. From 49,220 million euros to 52,740 million, while Lisbon declined from 65,590 to 63,194 million. In 2016, Northern Portugal GPD was 55,049.38 million euros at current market prices, a larger economy in that year than that of the whole countries of Bulgaria, Croatia or Slovenia, and with the largest growth in Portugal. In 2017, it reached 57,240.64 million, a 3.98% annual increase in GDP.

It is highly industrialized within its densely populated western half, where well developed subregions such as Ave, Cávado, Entre Douro e Vouga, Grande Porto, and Tâmega have a notable business activity and state-of-the-art infrastructure. Textiles, footwear, food processing, mechanical, electrical, electronics and chemical industries, as well as finance and construction, are some of the main economic activities.

Northern Portugal and Galicia form a Euroregion, based on the common historical, cultural, linguistic and economic similarities. The Euroregion has its origins in the Galicia-North Portugal Work Community, established in 1991. This Euroregion is also backed by the Eixo Atlântico ("Atlantic Axis"), a lobby of Galician and Northern Portuguese cities and municipalities.
