= Saint Andrew's Day =

Feast day celebrated on 30 November

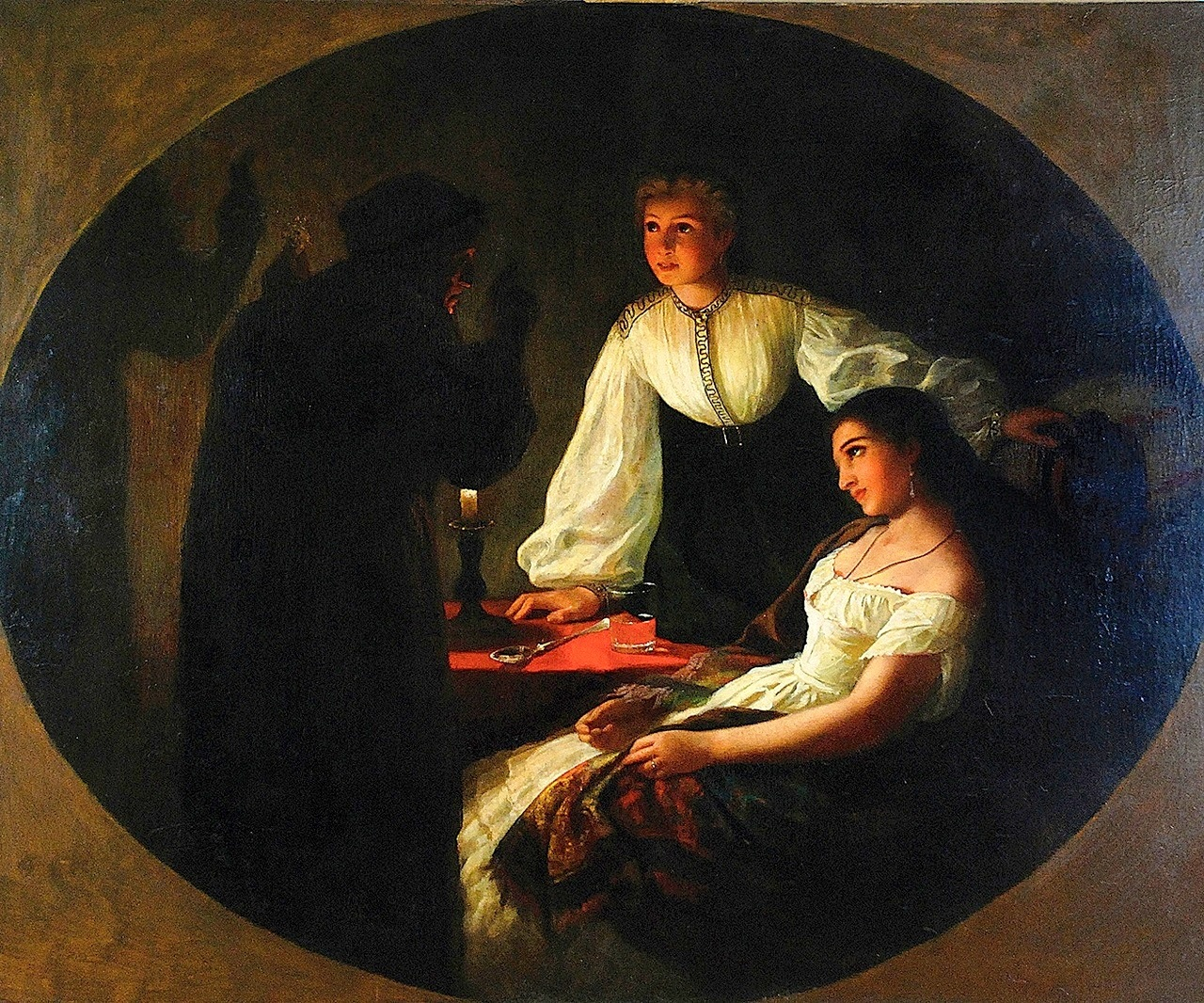
- Henryk Siemiradzki. St. Andrew's Night – Fortune-telling, 1867
- Observed by: Eastern Orthodox Church; Roman Catholic Church (traditional holy day of precept); Anglican Communion; Presbyterianism; Patronal feast of Scotland
- Type: Religious; National (in Scotland and Romania)
- Celebrations: Bank holiday (in Scotland and Romania)
- Date: 30 November (Western/Eastern Christianity); 12 May (Georgia)
- Duration: 4 days
- Frequency: Annual

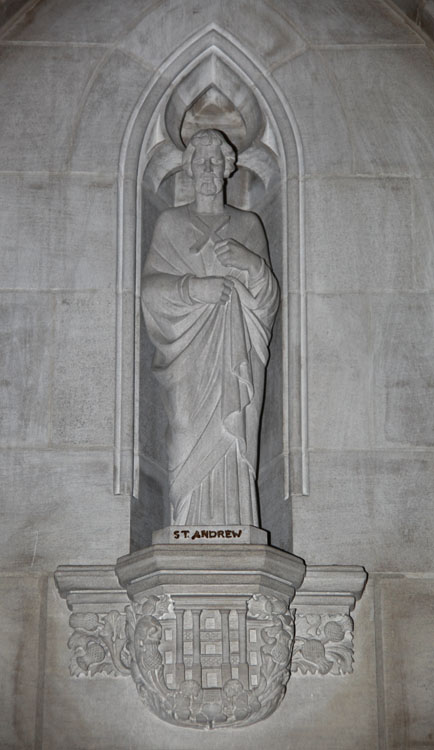
Saint Andrew as patron saint of Scotland. Sculpture in Washington National Cathedral, Washington D.C.

Saint Andrew's Day, also called the Feast of Saint Andrew or Andermas, is the feast day of Andrew the Apostle. It is celebrated on 30 November, during Scotland's Winter Festival. Saint Andrew is the disciple in the New Testament who introduced his brother, the Apostle Peter, to Jesus, the Messiah.

== Traditions and celebrations ==
Saint Andrew's Day marks the beginning of the traditional Advent devotion of the Saint Andrew Christmas Novena.

Saint Andrew's Day (Scots: Saunt Andra's Day, Scottish Gaelic: Là Naomh Anndrais / Latha Naomh Anndra) is Scotland's official national day. It has been a national holiday in Romania since 2015. He is the patron saint of Cyprus, Scotland, Greece (City of Patras), Romania, Russia, Ukraine, the Ecumenical Patriarchate of Constantinople, San Andres Island (Colombia), Saint Andrew (Barbados), Tenerife (Spain), and Chamoson (Switzerland).

== Scotland ==
The celebration of Saint Andrew as a national festival among some social strata and locales is thought to originate from the reign of Malcolm III (1058–1093). It was thought that the ritual slaughter of animals associated with Samhain was moved to this date to ensure enough animals were kept alive for winter. Still, it is only in more recent times that 30 November has been given national holiday status, although it remains a normal working day.

=== Bank holiday ===
In 2006, the Scottish Parliament passed the St. Andrew's Day Bank Holiday (Scotland) Act 2007, which designated the day as an official bank holiday. If 30 November falls on a weekend, the next Monday is a bank holiday instead. Although it is a "bank holiday", banks are not required to close (and, in practice, will remain open as normal), and employers are not required to give their employees the day off as a holiday. Likewise, schools remain open.

The University of St Andrews traditionally gives the day for all the students as a free holiday, but this is not a binding rule.

=== Saltire ===
Saint Andrew's Day is an official flag day in Scotland. The Scottish Government's flag-flying regulations state that the flag of Scotland (the Saltire or Saint Andrew's Cross) shall fly on all its buildings with a flagpole. Before 2002, the Scottish Government followed the UK Government's flag days and would fly the Saltire on Saint Andrew's Day only. The regulations were updated to state that the Union Flag would be removed and replaced by the Saltire on buildings with only one flagpole.

The flying of the Union Flag from Edinburgh Castle on all days, including Saint Andrew's Day, causes anger among some Scottish politicians who have argued that the Saltire should fly on 30 November instead. However, the Union Flag is flown by the British Army at the Castle as it is an official British Army flag flying station.

=== Celebrations ===
In Scotland and many countries with Scottish connections, Saint Andrew's Day is marked with a celebration of Scottish culture and traditional Scottish food and music. In Scotland, the day is also seen as the start of a season of Scottish winter festivals encompassing Saint Andrew's Day, Hogmanay and Burns Night. There are week-long celebrations in the town of St Andrews and some other Scottish cities.

== Barbados ==
Saint Andrew's Day is celebrated as the national day of Independence in Barbados. As the patron saint, Saint Andrew is celebrated in some Barbadian symbols, including the cross formation of the Barbadian Coat of Arms, and the former Order of Barbados which styled recipients as Knight or Dame of St Andrew.

== Georgia ==
The church tradition of Georgia regards Andrew as the first preacher of Christianity in the territory of Georgia and as the founder of the Georgian church. This tradition derives from Byzantine sources, particularly Niketas David Paphlagon (died c. 890) who asserts that "Andrew preached to the Iberians, Sauromatians, Taurians, and Scythians and to every region and city, on the Black Sea, both north and south." The version was adopted by the 10th–11th-century Georgian ecclesiastics and, refurbished with more details, was inserted in the Georgian Chronicles. The story of Andrew's mission in the Georgian lands endowed the Georgian church with apostolic origin and served as a defence argument to George the Hagiorite against the encroachments from the Antiochian church authorities on autocephaly of the Georgian church. Another Georgian monk, Ephraim the Minor, produced a thesis, reconciling Andrew's story with an earlier evidence of the 4th-century conversion of Georgians by Nino and explaining the necessity of the "second Christening" by Nino. The thesis was made canonical by the Georgian church council in 1103. The Georgian Orthodox Church marks two feast days in honour of Saint Andrew, on 12 May and 13 December. The former date, dedicated to Andrew's arrival in Georgia, is a public holiday in Georgia.

== Romania ==
There are a few pre-Christian Romanian traditions connected to Saint Andrew's Day, with some of them having their origin in the Roman celebrations of the god Saturn, most famously the Saturnalia.

The Dacian New Year took place from 14 November until 7 December; this was considered the interval when time began its course. One of the elements that came from the Roman and Thracian celebrations concerned wolves. During this night, wolves can eat all the animals they want. It is said that they can speak, too, but anyone who hears them will soon die. Early on Saint Andrew's Day, the mothers go into the garden and gather tree branches, especially from apple, pear, cherry trees, and rosebush branches. They make a bunch of branches for each family member. The one whose bunch blooms by New Year's Day will be lucky and healthy the following year. The best-known tradition connected to this night concerns matrimony and premonitory dreams. Single girls must put a sprig or branch of sweet basil under their pillow. The girl will marry soon if someone takes the plants in their dreams. They can also plant wheat in a dish and water it until New Year's Day. The nicer the wheat looks that day, the better the year to come.

== Serbia ==
On Saint Andrew's Day in 1806, Serbs liberated Belgrade from Ottoman rule. On 12 December 1830 (St. Andrew's Day), the Hatt-i şerif was read before the assembly in Belgrade. The document has defined the autonomy of Serbia as a part of the Ottoman Empire, and the additional berat confirmed Prince Miloš as hereditary ruler of the Serbian Principality. St. Andrew's Day was thus instituted as Statehood Restoration Day, and was celebrated during the rule of the Obrenović dynasty until 1903.

== Saint Andrew's Eve ==
In parts of Ukraine, Germany, Austria, Slovakia, Poland, Russia, and Romania, a superstitious belief exists that the night before Saint Andrew's Day is especially suitable for magic that reveals a young woman's future husband or that binds a future husband to her. The day was believed to be the start of the most popular time for vampire activity, which would last until Saint George's Eve (22 April).

In Poland, the holiday Andrzejki is celebrated on the night of the 29th through 30 November. Traditionally, the holiday was only observed by young single girls, though today, both young men and women join the party to see their futures. The main ceremony involved pouring hot wax from a candle through the hole in a key into cold water.

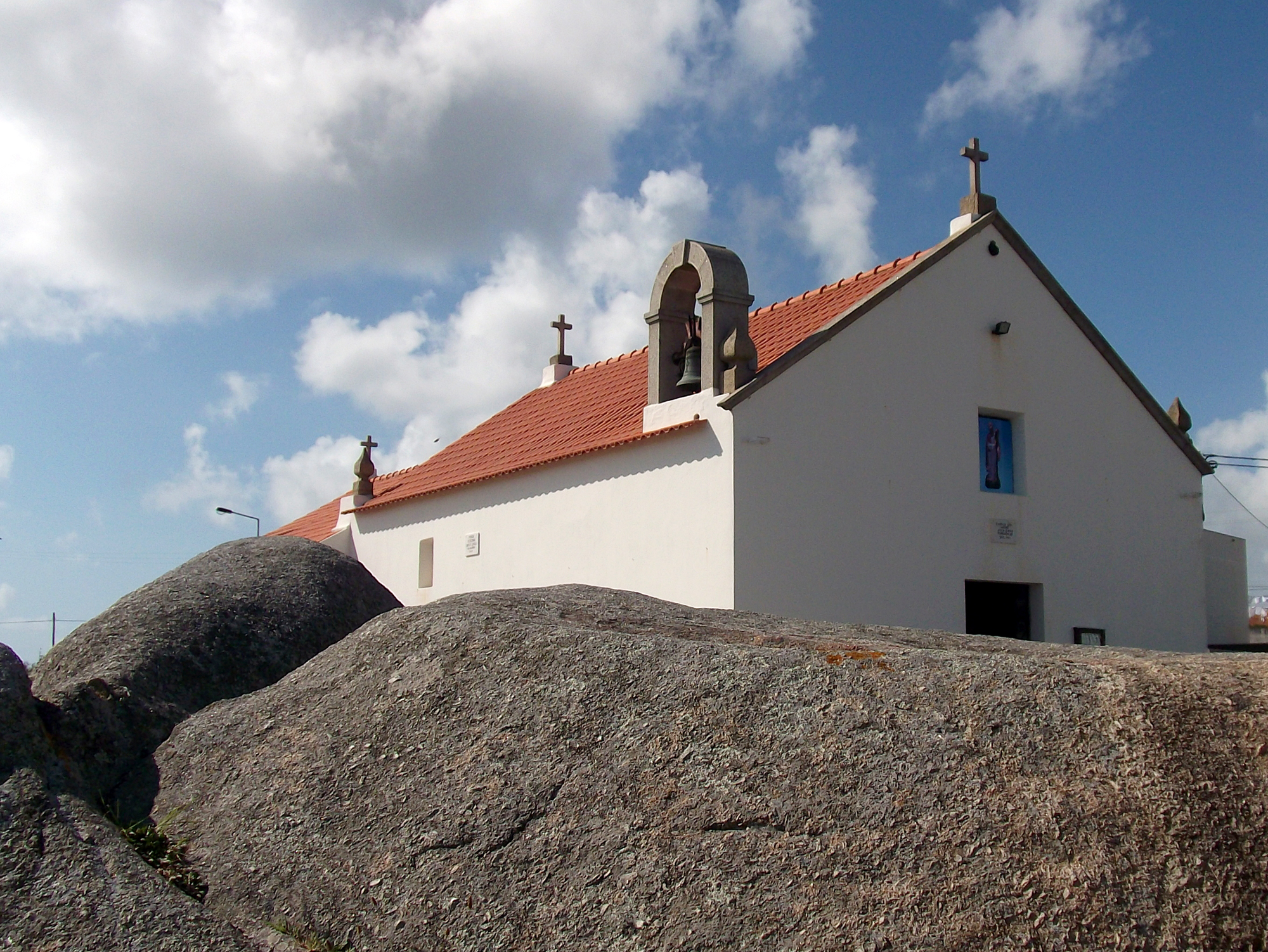
Saint Andrew's Chapel and rocks in Saint Andrew's Cape in Póvoa de Varzim, Portugal. In local mythology, Saint Andrew fished the souls of those drowned at sea and helped in fisheries and marriages.

In Romania, it is customary for young women to put 41 grains of wheat beneath their pillow before they go to sleep, and if they dream that someone is coming to steal their grains, they will get married next year. Also, in other parts of the country, the young women light a candle from Easter and bring it to a fountain at midnight. They ask Saint Andrew to let them glimpse their future husband. Saint Andrew is invoked to ward off wolves, who are thought to be able to eat any animal they want on this night and to speak to humans. A human hearing a wolf talk to him will die. Saint Andrew is also the patron saint of Romania and the Romanian Orthodox Church.

In Póvoa de Varzim, an ancient fishing town in northern Portugal, Cape Santo André (Portuguese for Saint Andrew) is a place that shows evidence of Romanisation and probable earlier importance, with hints of Stone Age paintings. Near the cape there are small depressions in a rock, a mystery stone, that the people believe are the footprints of Saint Andrew. Saint Andrew's Chapel is of probable mediaeval origin, referenced in 1546 and earlier documents. It is the burial site of drowned fishermen found at the cape. Fishermen also requested intervention from the saint for better catches. Single girls wanting to get married threw a little stone to the chapel's roof, hoping it would lodge. Because of pagan syncretism, it has also been associated with white magic up to the present day. It was common to see groups of fishermen, holding lights in their hands, making a pilgrimage to the cape's chapel along the beach on Saint Andrew's Eve. They believed Saint Andrew fished, from the depths, the souls of the drowned. Those who did not visit Santo André in life would have to make the pilgrimage as a corpse.

== Eton College ==
St Andrew's Day has become one of the two biggest holidays marked at Eton College, the other being the Fourth of June.

== See also ==
- Calendar of saints
- General Roman Calendar
- Saint David's Day
- Saint George's Day
- Saint Patrick's Day
