= Scotland's Winter Festival =

Annual nationwide festival

Scotland's Winter Festival is an annual, nationwide festival that takes place across the winter months of November, December and January. Three particular events are highlighted: Saint Andrew's Day, Hogmanay and Burns night.

== Background and Participation ==
Winter has always been an important time in the Scottish calendar, encompassing many cultural events and historical traditions, such as Halloween and Beltane - including the three national days of St Andrews Day, Hogmanay and Burns Night. Scotland's Winter Festival works these events into a winter long festival across Scotland. In 2017 the festival encompassed 23 events across 17 local authority areas.

The events included are wide-ranging, from a "festival of lights" at the Scottish Maritime Museum & Harbourside, to a variety of Hogmanay events across Scotland.
