= Cape Santo André =

Headland in Portugal

- Cape
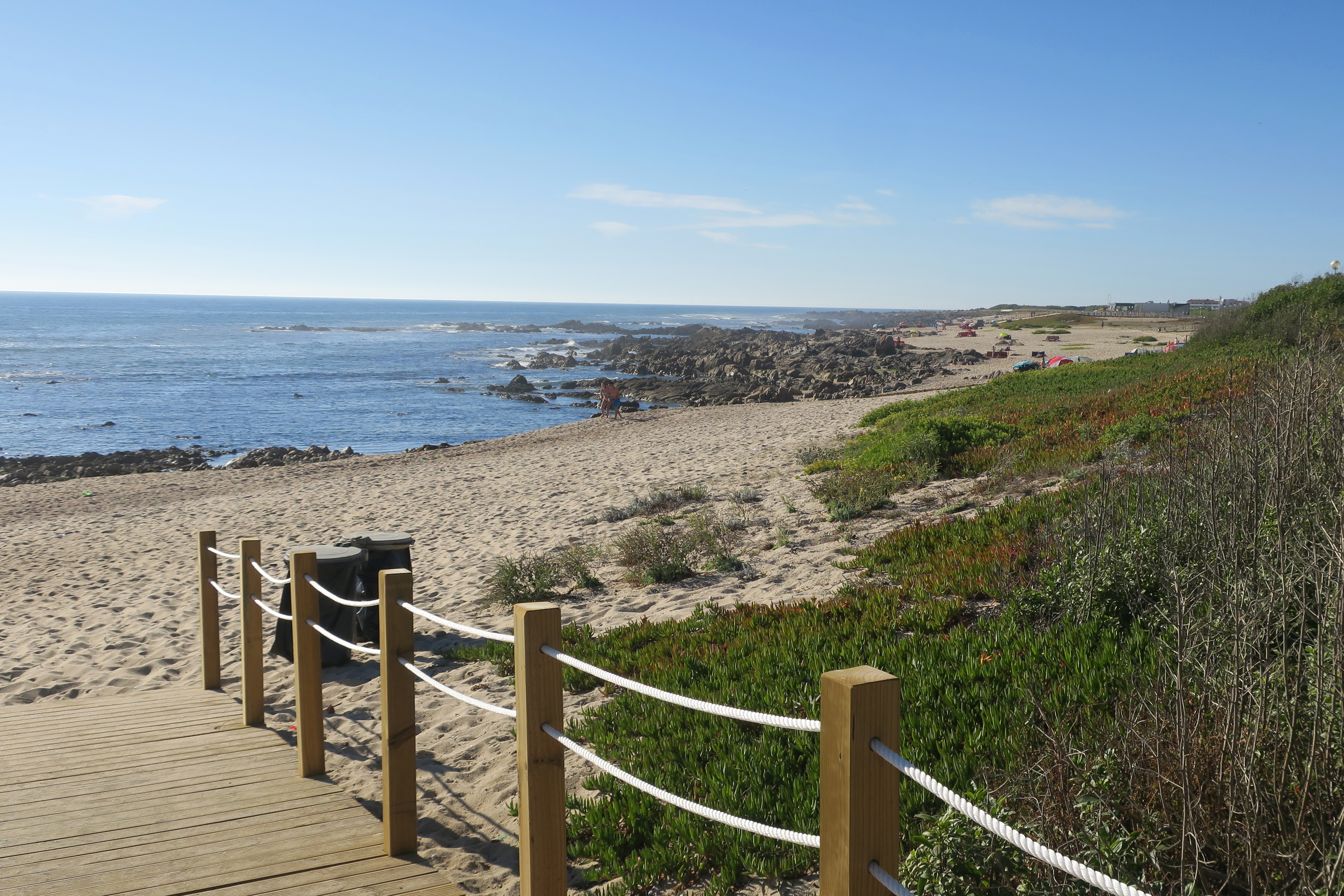
- Cape Santo André, with occasional sea spray, as seen from Jardim da Praia Promenade in Póvoa de Varzim.

- Location within Portugal Location within Europe
- Coordinates: 41.414°N 8.787°W

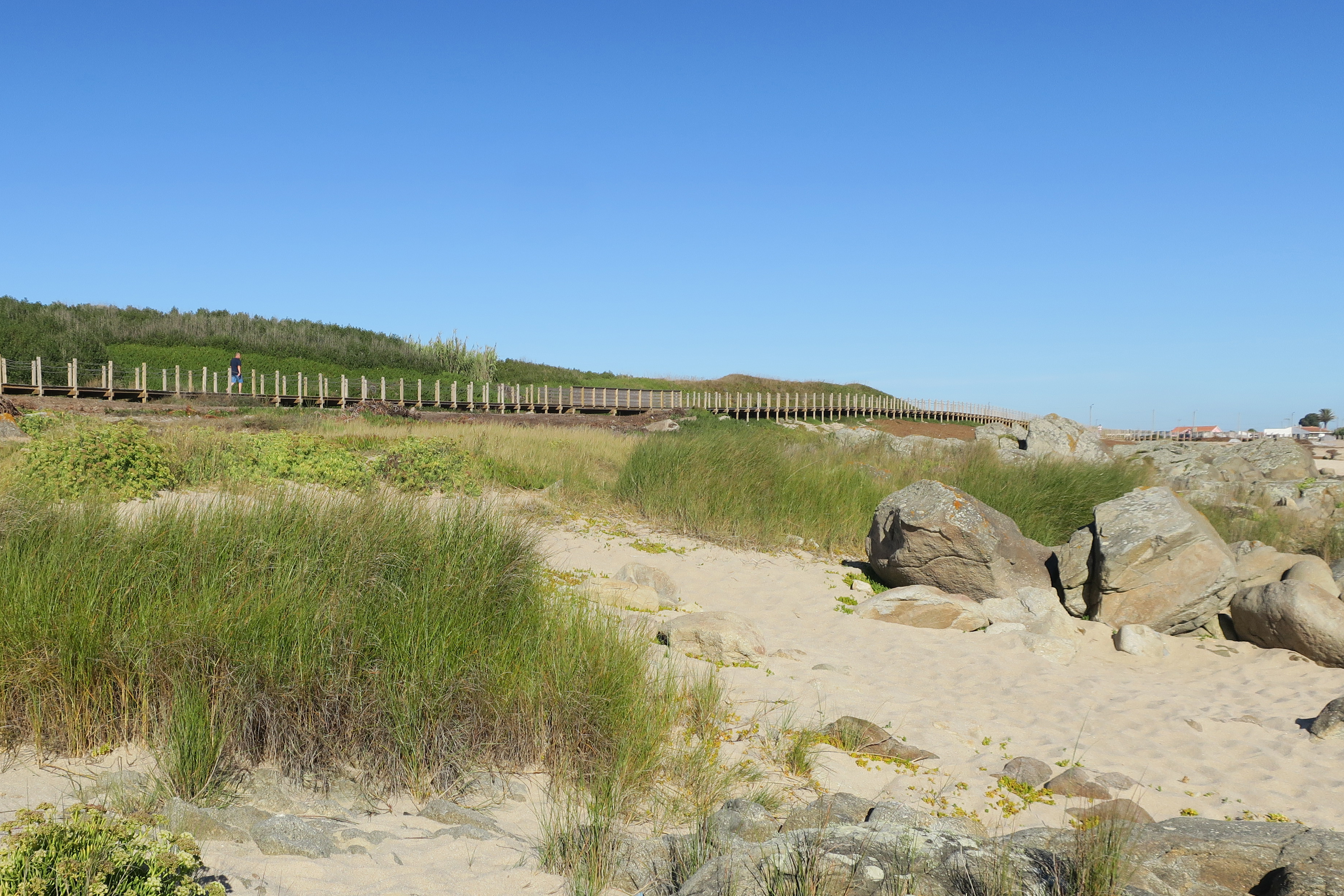
Santo André Dune. The Boardwalk is on the route of the Portuguese Way of Saint James and the night pilgrimage of Saint Andrew.

Cape Santo André (Portuguese for Saint Andrew) is a cape located in the Northern coast of continental Portugal, in Santo André, municipality of Póvoa de Varzim. It is the tip of Póvoa de Varzim's cuspate foreland.

It is probably the old Roman Avarius, Auarius Promontorium or Auaron Promontorium (In Ancient Greek, Αὔαρον ἄκρον) referred by Ptolemy, geographer of Ancient Greece, in the territory of the Callaici Bracares, between the river Avus (Ave River) and river Nebis (Neiva River).

== Geography ==
The cape has a small sheltered beach between its boulders known as Dois Cabos Beach, literally two headlands beach.

It is the westernmost point in Póvoa de Varzim and the center of Póvoa de Varzim triangular shaped territory that enters into the sea and is surrounded by the Atlantic by the north and south.

The cape has iconic views over coastal northern Portugal. The northern coves of Póvoa de Varzim and the city are visible to the South and the sand dunes of Coastal Northern Portugal Parkland in Esposende and the Minho river rocky cliffs can be seen to the North.

Cape Santo André

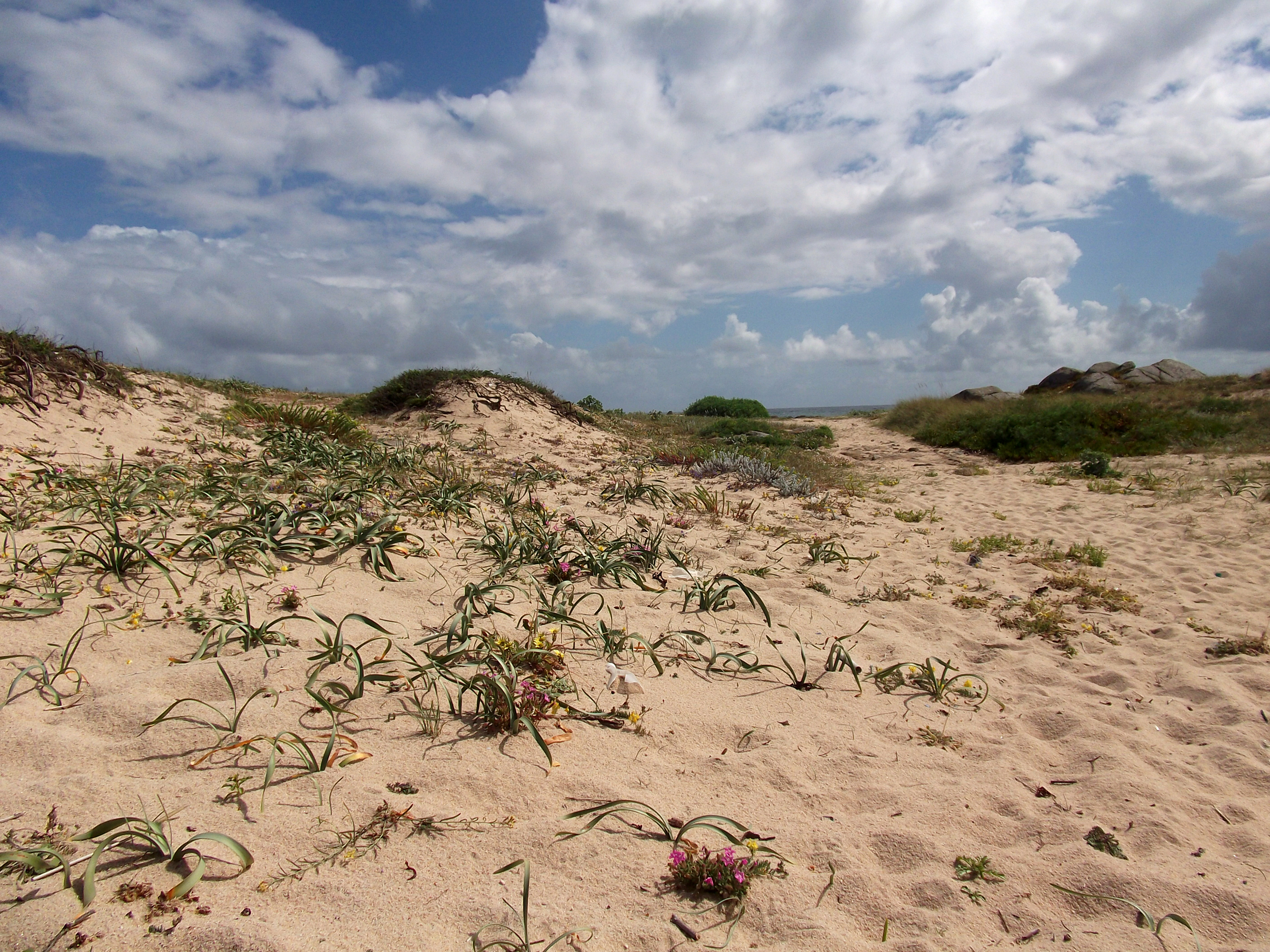
Dunes in the cape

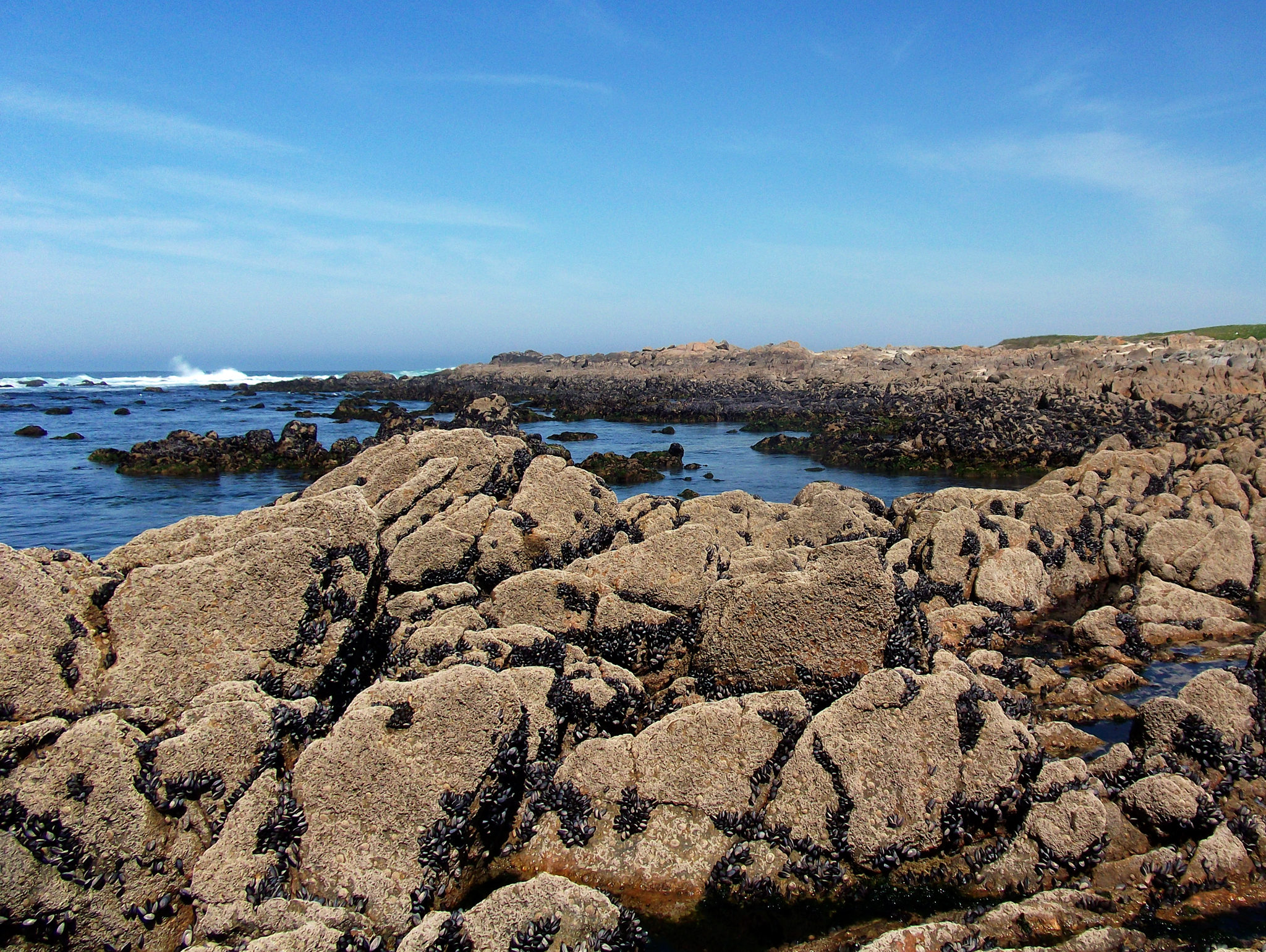
The cape

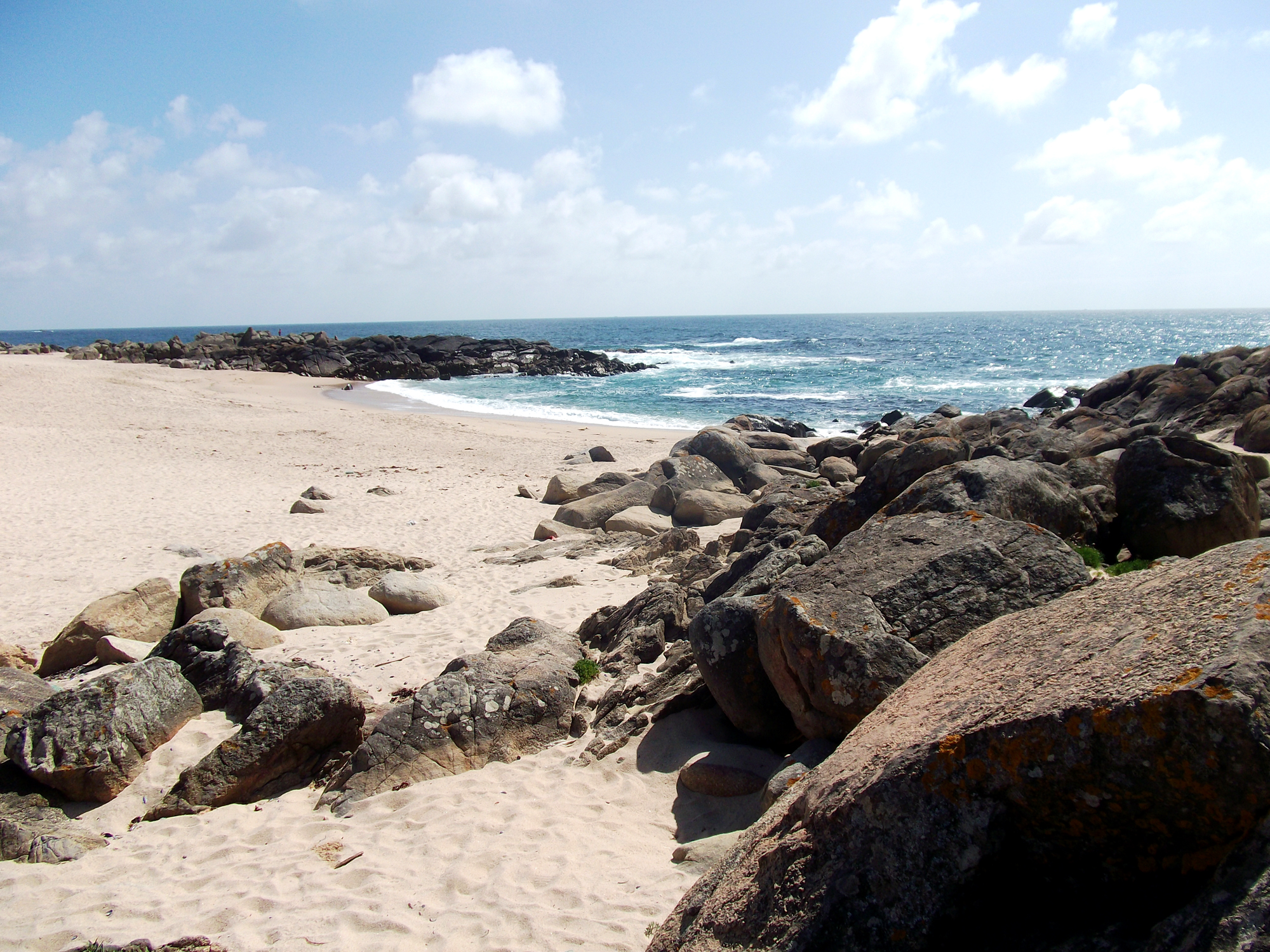
Dois Cabos Beach during high tide

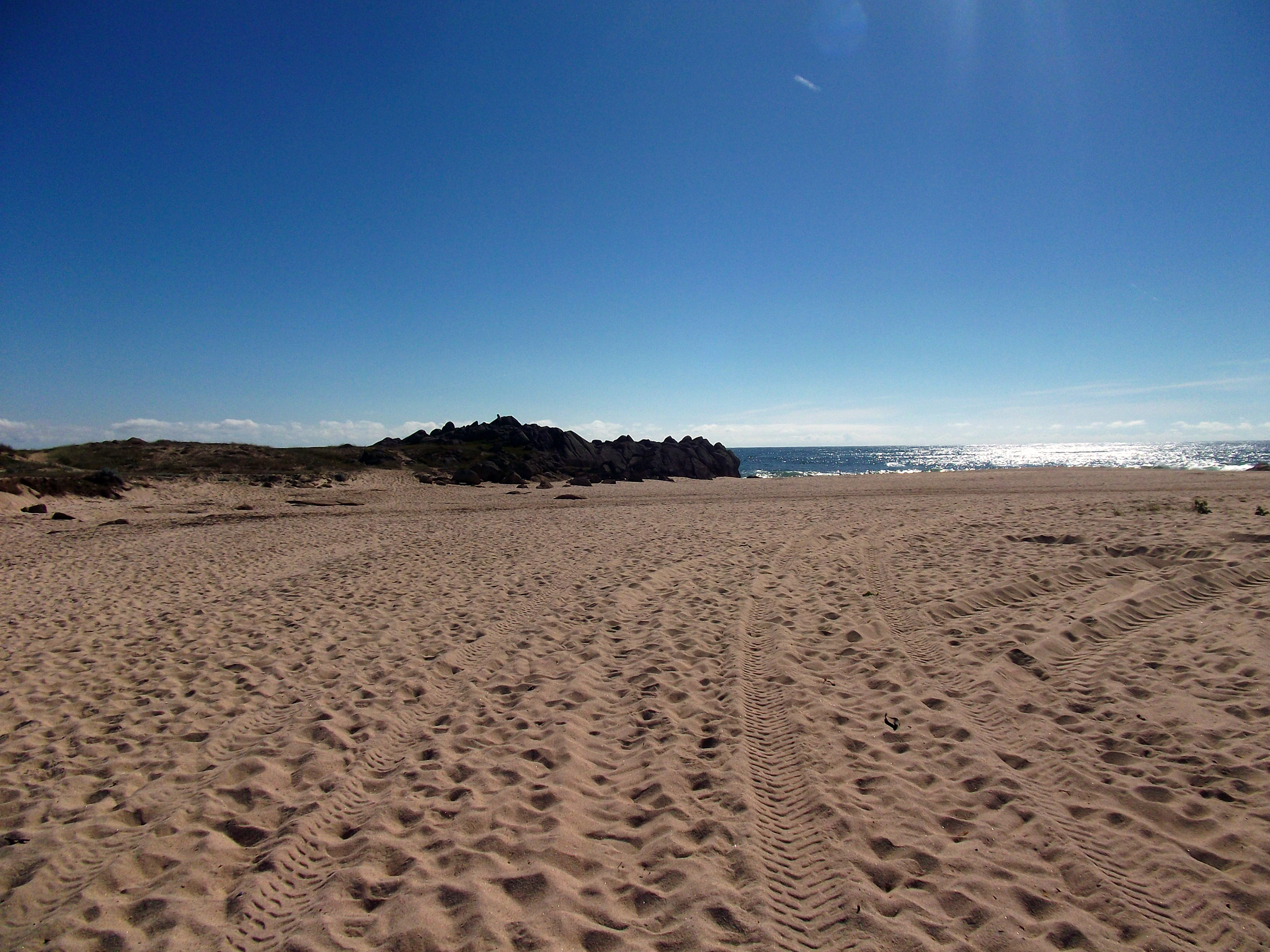
The Cape as seen from Santo André Beach

== Flora ==
The cape has a native dune flora, including Honckenya peploides, Otanthus maritimus, Eryngium maritimum, Ammophila arenaria, Juncus acutus, Silene littorea, and several other species, although most of the cape is dominated by the invasive species Carpobrotus edulis.

== Religion and beliefs ==
Near the cape are Saint Andrew's chapel and Rock, to which Povoan fishermen dedicate a night pilgrimage along the beach on the last day of November. The sandy pilgrimage way is also part of the demarcated Coastal Way of Saint James, that goes along the beaches and it is increasingly popular. Pilgrims reach an easier-to-cross beach walkway in Quião, towards the cape and Santo André Beach. The cape presents impressive scenery with numerous tide pools during low tide. The chapel is of probable medieval origin, early references are found in a document from 1546 and in other earlier ones. The chapel was built using vernacular architecture, however its art is mostly neoclassical. The icons from the chapel date to the 17th century; a 15th-century icon from the chapel is preserved in Braga's Pius XII Museum.

There was ancient cult activity in Póvoa de Varzim, shown by hints of Stone Age paintings and Roman activity at the site. Superstition regarding this site remains strong in the local populace, as can be seen in the placement of tiny rocks in a niche sculpted in the rocks or in the chapel itself, or in the ceremonial burning of candles used by mainstream Catholic rituals or white magic. The people believe the chapel's saint helps in fisheries and arranging marriages. In order to get married girls threw a tiny stone to the roof of the chapel; if the stone didn't fall from it, a marriage would occur soon. According to local legends, Saint Andrew is the boatman of souls, and fishes cadavers from shipwrecks. Several victims found near the cape were buried below the chapel.
