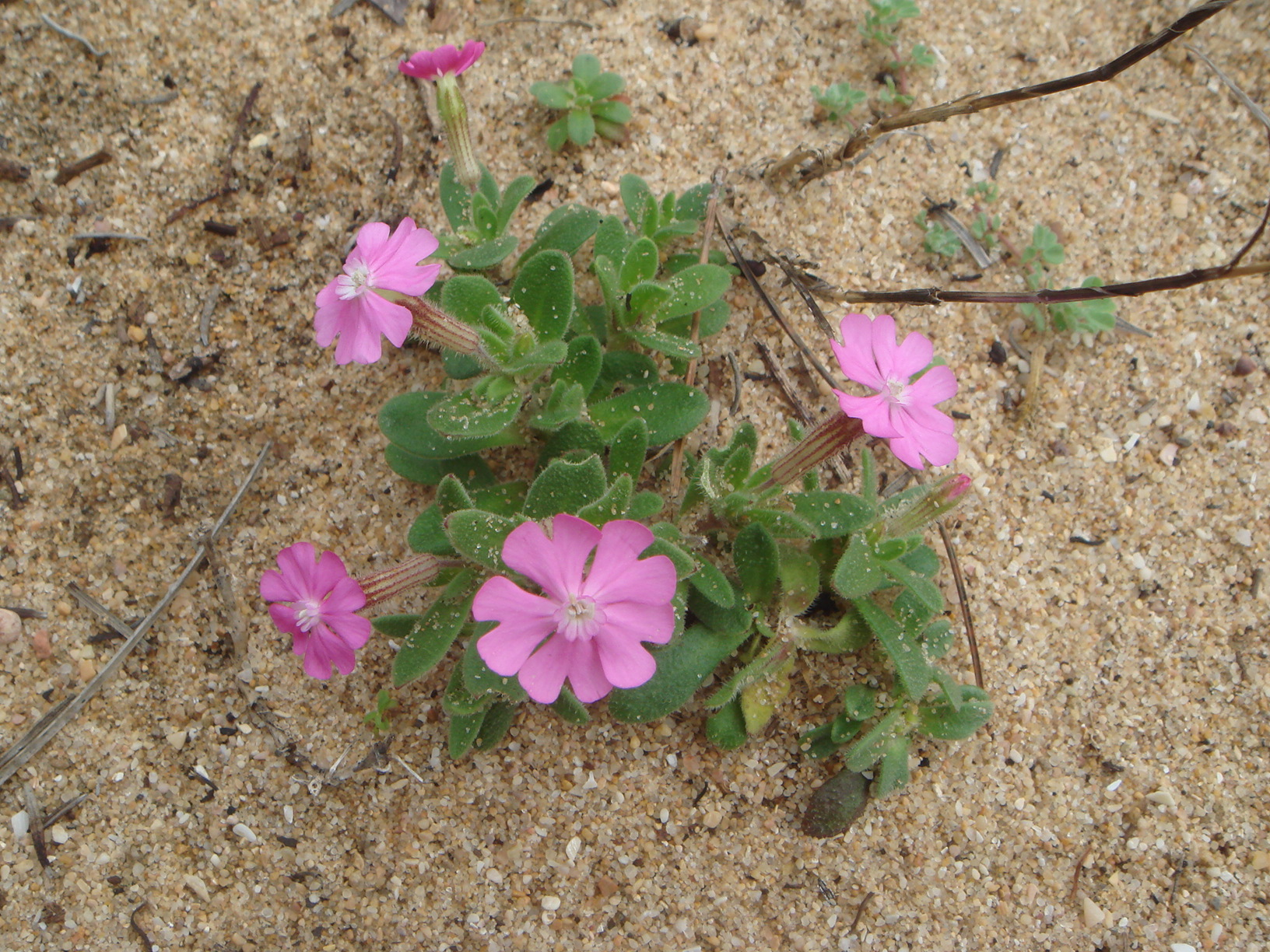

Scientific classification
- Kingdom: Plantae
- Clade: Tracheophytes
- Clade: Angiosperms
- Clade: Eudicots
- Order: Caryophyllales
- Family: Caryophyllaceae
- Genus: Silene
- Species: S. littorea

Binomial name
- Silene littorea Brot.

Synonyms
- Silene allophila; Silene halophile; Silene halophila; Silene hispanica; Silene littorea; Silene nana; Silene prostrata

= Silene littorea =

Species of flowering plant

Silene littorea is a species of flowering plant within the family Caryophyllaceae. The species has the gynodioecy–gynomonoecy sexual system. It is one of the most studied species with this sexual system.

== Description ==
Silene littorea is a low growing annual plant reaching heights of around 15 cm tall. The plant is covered in sticky hairs known as trichomes.

=== Flowers ===
Silene littorea flowers are about 2 cm in diameter and possess five petals. The species exhibits flower colour polymorphism: with light pink, dark pink and white flowered colour morphs being present within Silene littorea populations. The flowers of Silene lottorea can either be female or hermaphordite. An individual plant can possess any three sexual phenotypes, with plants possessing either female only flowers, hermaphorodite only flowers or even a mix of both.

== Distribution ==
The species is native to Morocco, Portugal, Spain. The population of this species has been observed to be declining in Spain. The species is rare in Gibraltr and restricted to eastern sandy slopes.

== Habitat ==
Silene littorea grows in sandy soils on coastal locations. It can often be found inhabiting coastal sand dunes.

== Subspecies ==
The following subspecies are recognised:

- Silene littorea adscendens
- Silene littorea littorea
