= Northern Littoral Natural Park =

Protected area in Portugal

Litoral Norte Natural Park
- IUCN category V (protected landscape/seascape)
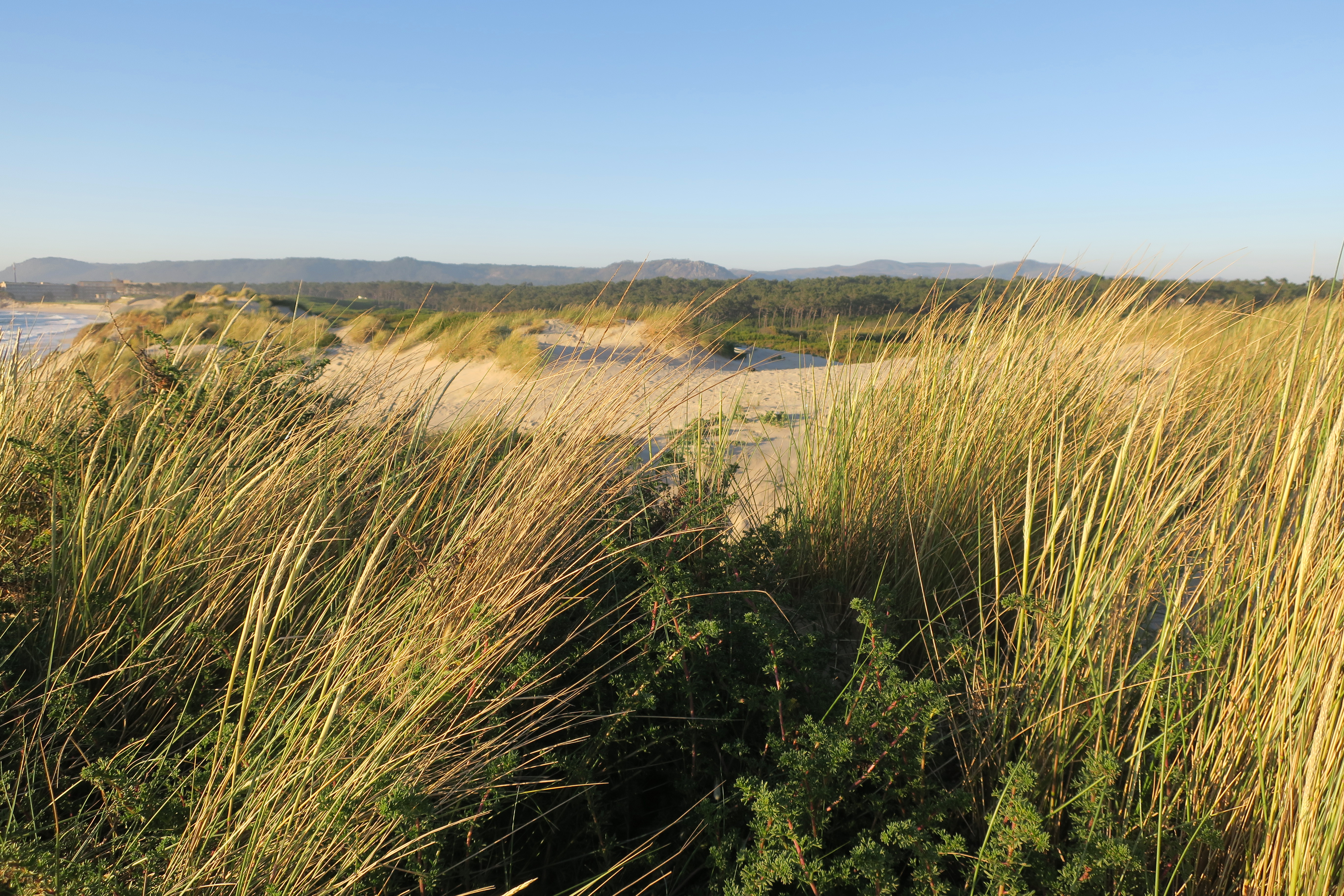

- Location within Portugal
- Location: Braga & Porto districts, Portugal
- Nearest city: Esposende
- Coordinates: 41°31′36″N 8°47′7″W
- Length: 16 km (9.9 mi)
- Area: 87.62 km^{2} (33.83 sq mi) (85% aquatic)
- Created: November 17, 1987
- Governing body: ICNF

The Northern Littoral Natural Park (Portuguese: Parque Natural do Litoral Norte) is one of the thirteen natural parks of Portugal. It encompasses the shores of the Atlantic Ocean in the municipality of Esposende. The park was created to preserve the dunes and the wildlife in the area, mainly birds and fish.

The park has the longest and best preserved stretch of Atlantic dunes in northern Portugal. The estuaries of Cávado and Neiva are home to some of the most significant habitats in the park. It has around 240 species of plant. 140 species of birds can be observed in the terrestrial area alone. The estuarine zone is an important area for food and rest during migrations and in winter. It has 19 species and 8 potential species of mammals.

It is an area of intense agricultural activity, namely in masseiras, also called troughs, cultivated fields dug in the sand next to the dunes until very close to the water table, which thus ensure water and protection from the winds to the crops. This coast is one of the traditional places for gathering sargassum, which was collected in June and dried in the sun. Indeed, the sands of the Minho coast were fertilized thanks to the use of seaweed and pilado (small crustacean), for many years the main fertilizers used. The festa dos sargaceiros of Apulia, with their typical costumes, is just one of the many festivities that take place here.

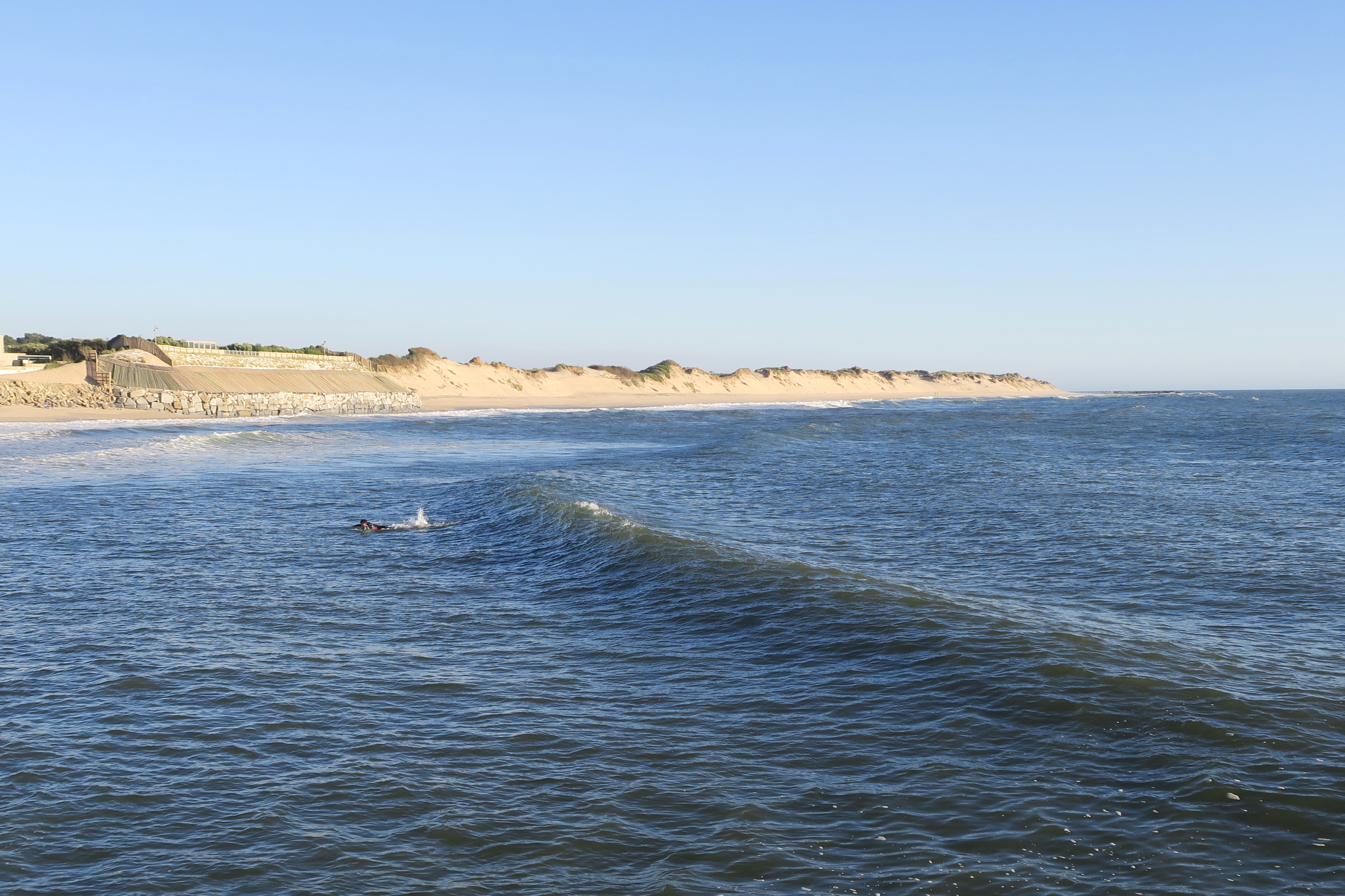

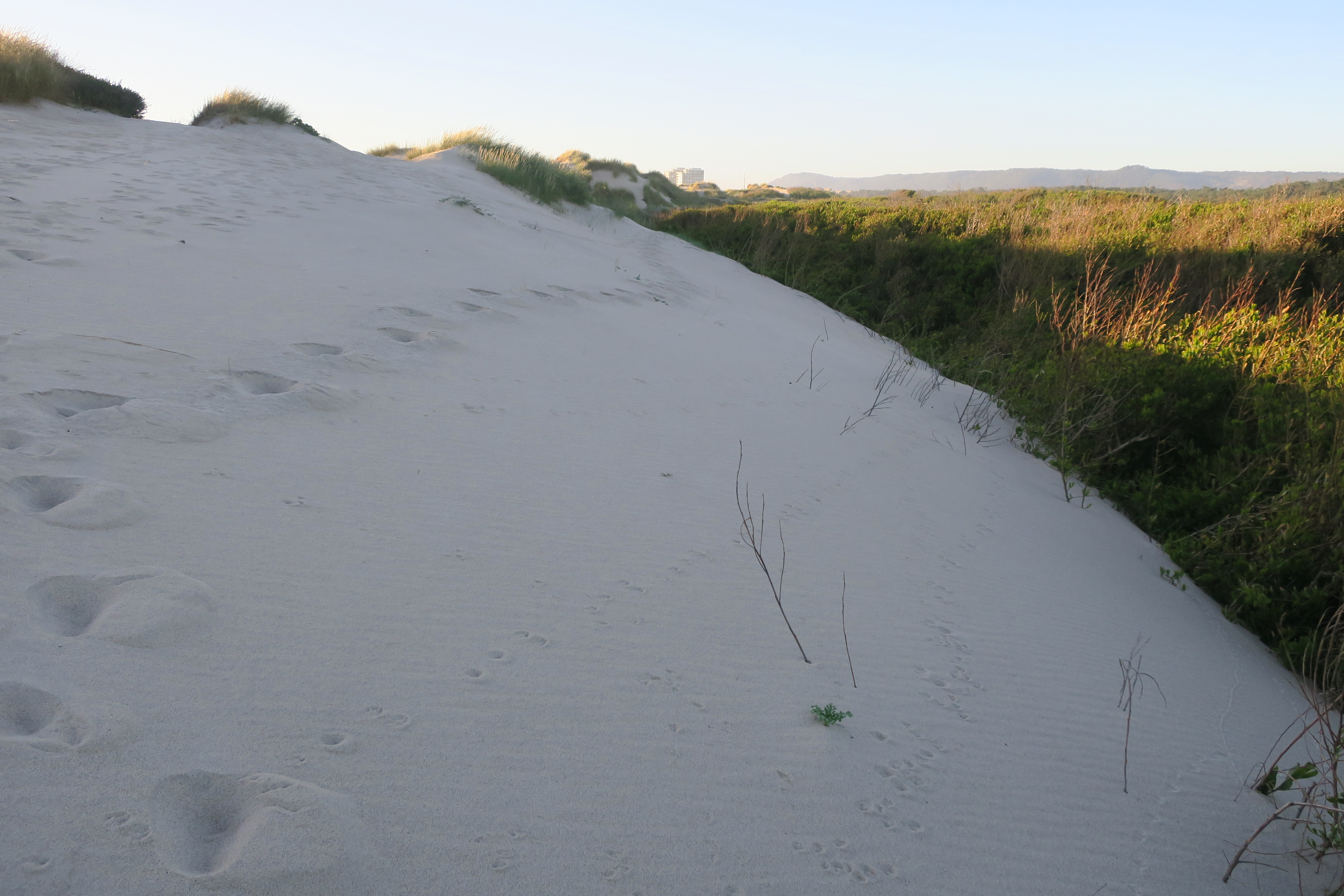

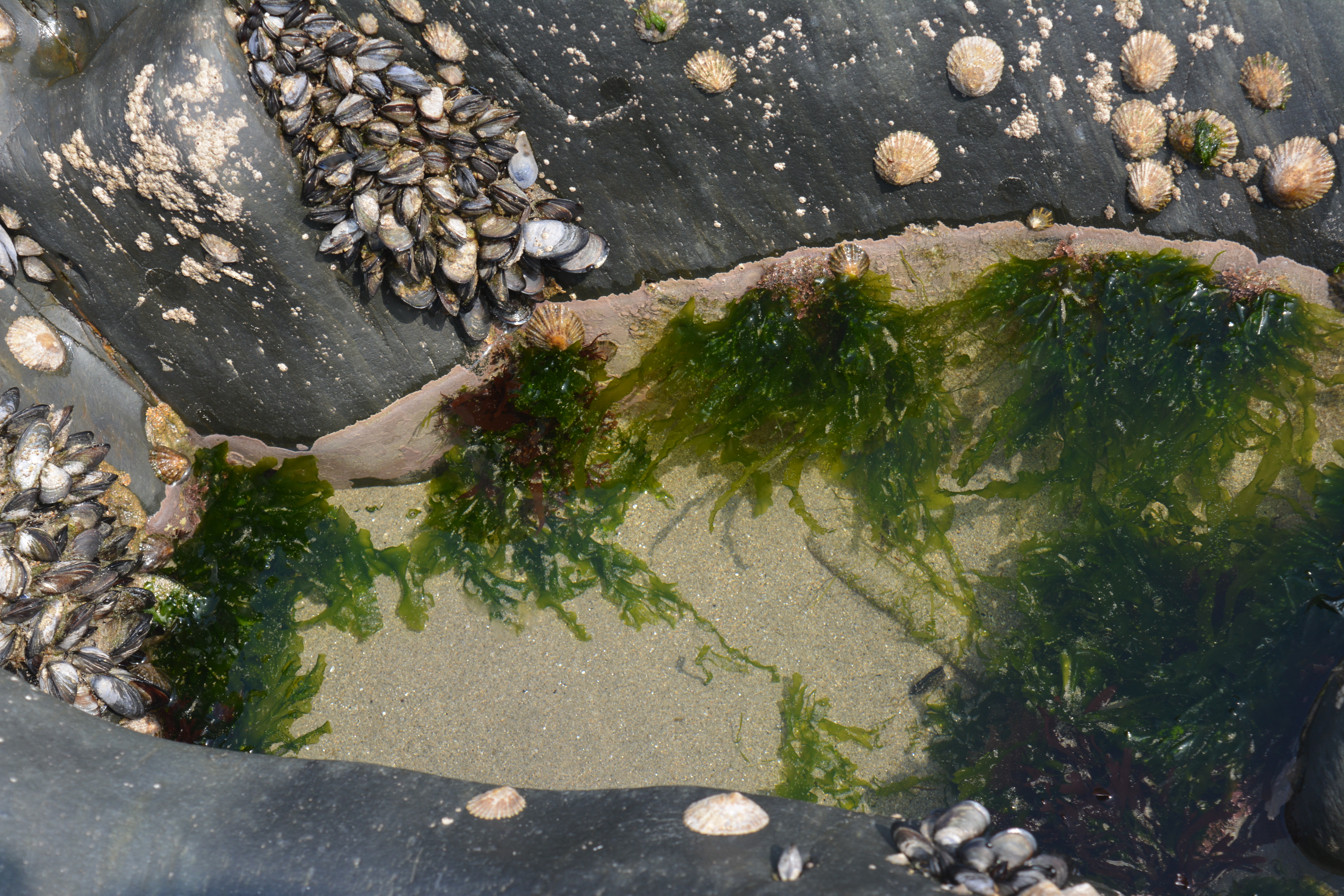

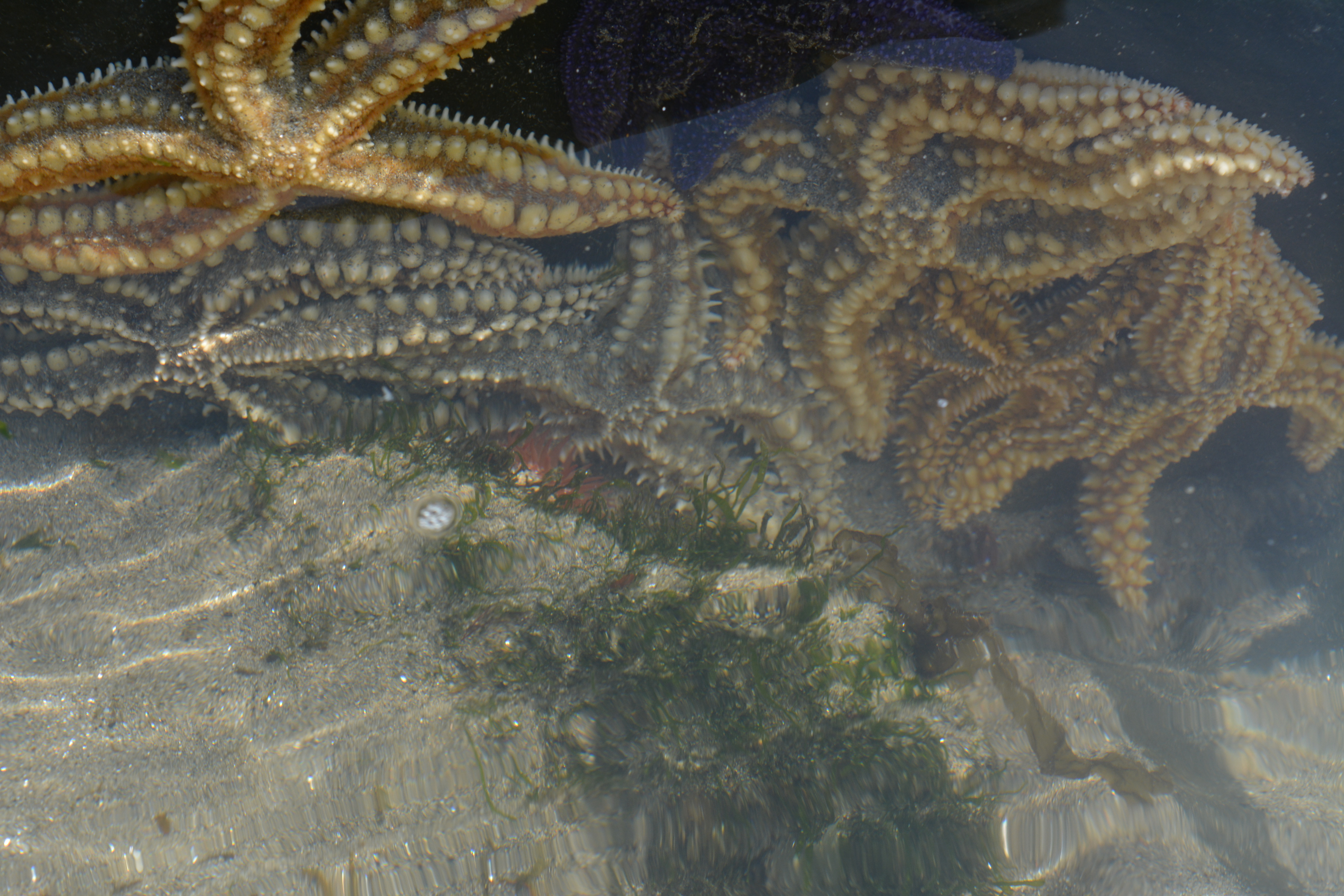

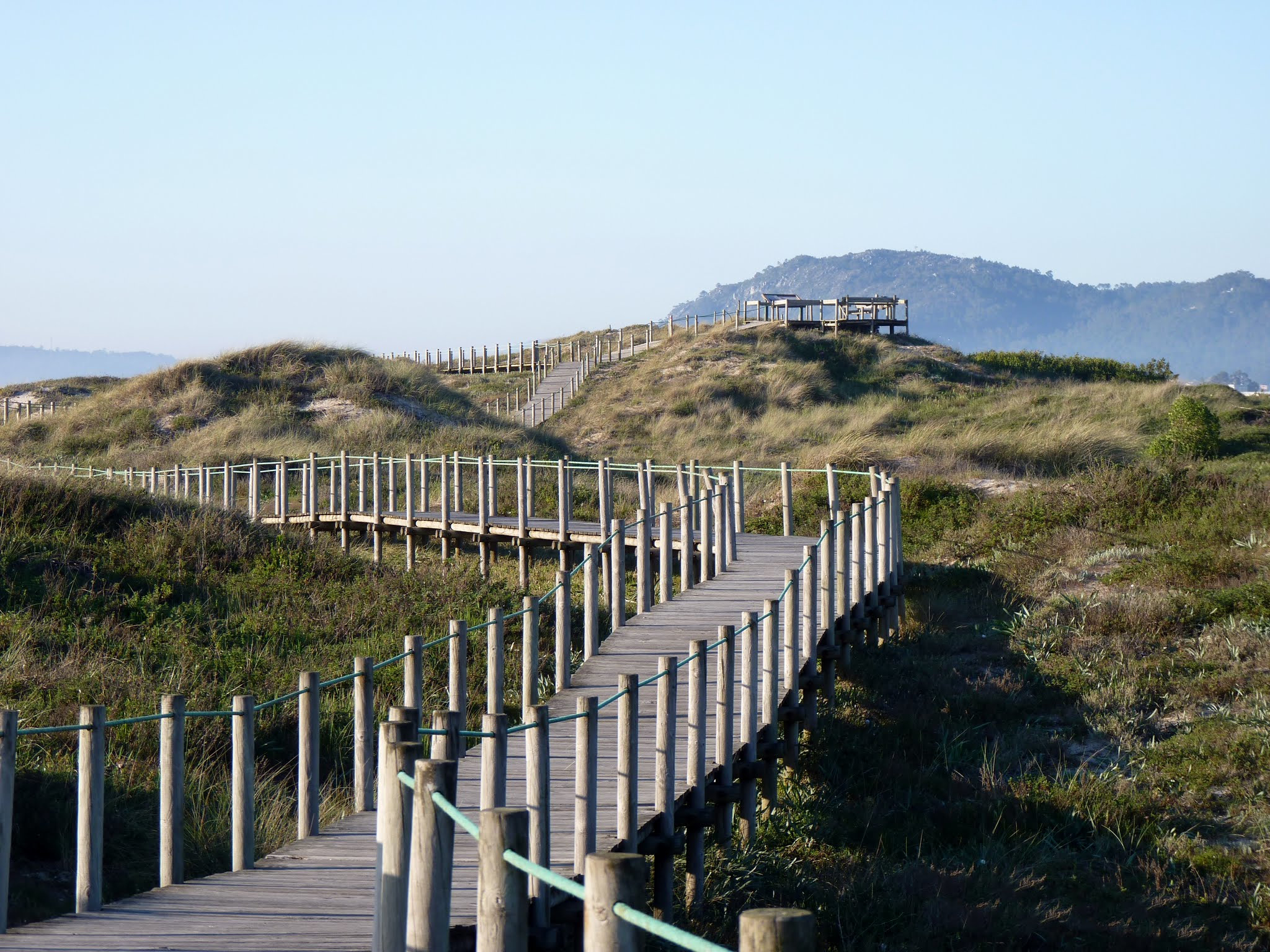

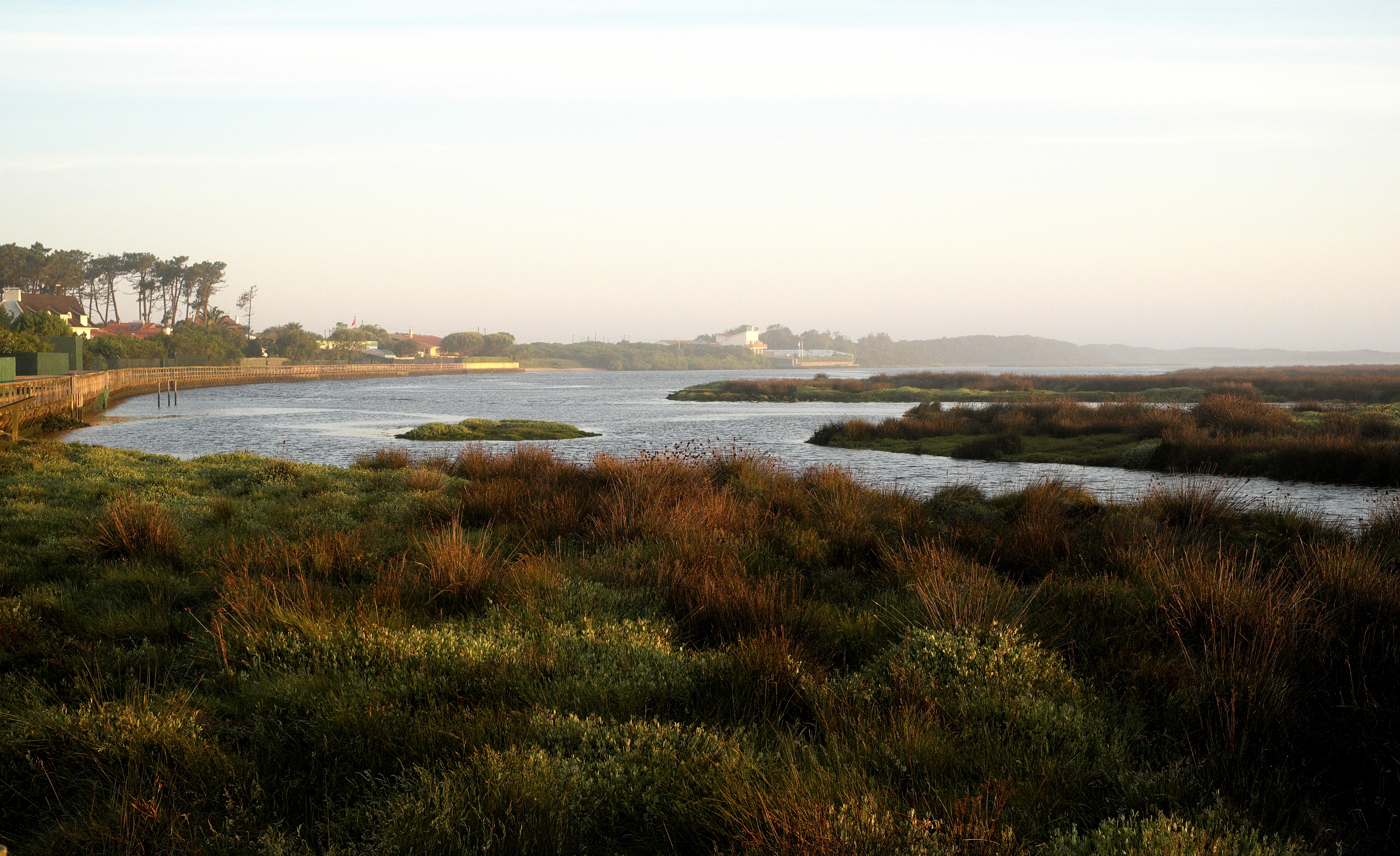

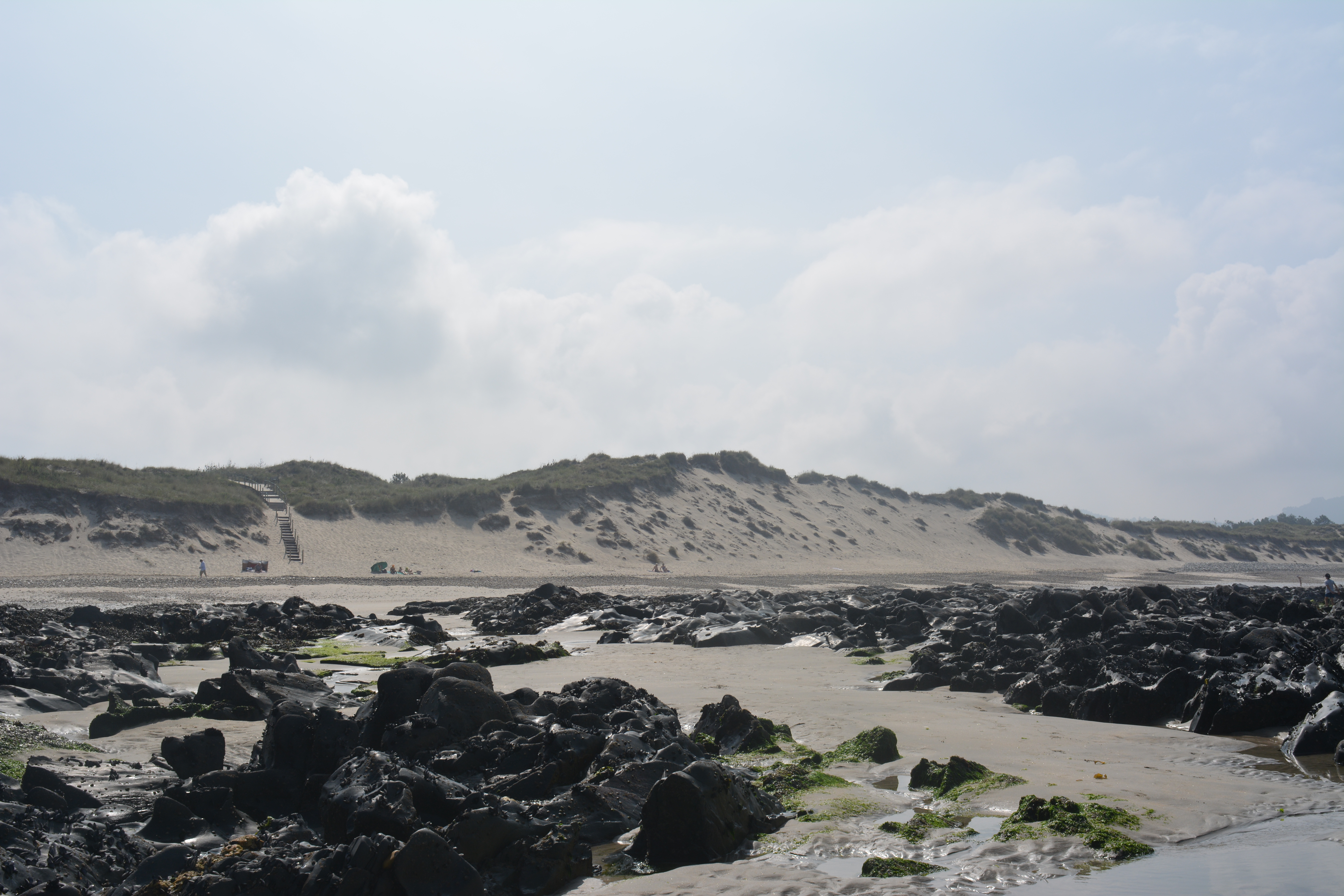

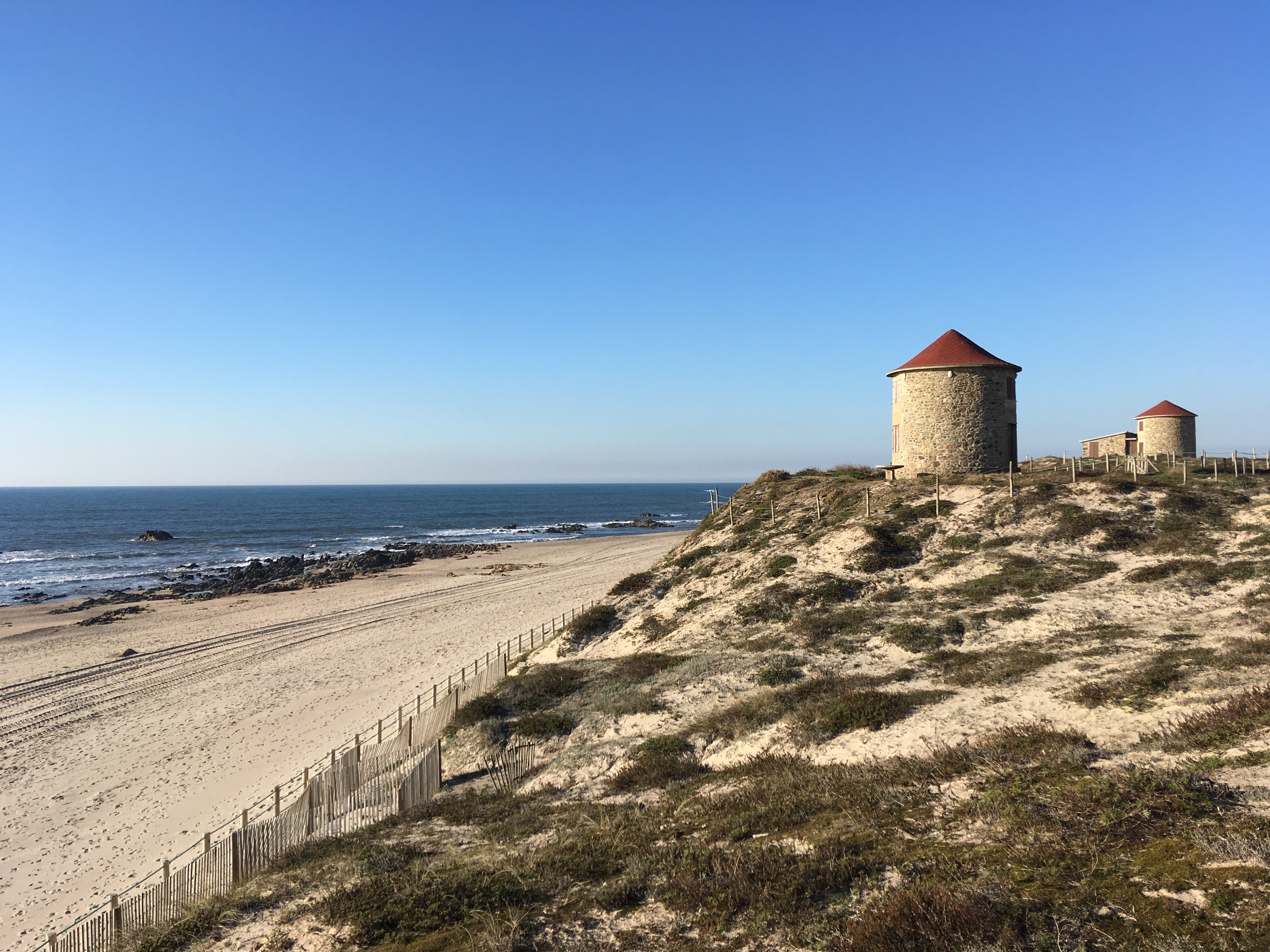

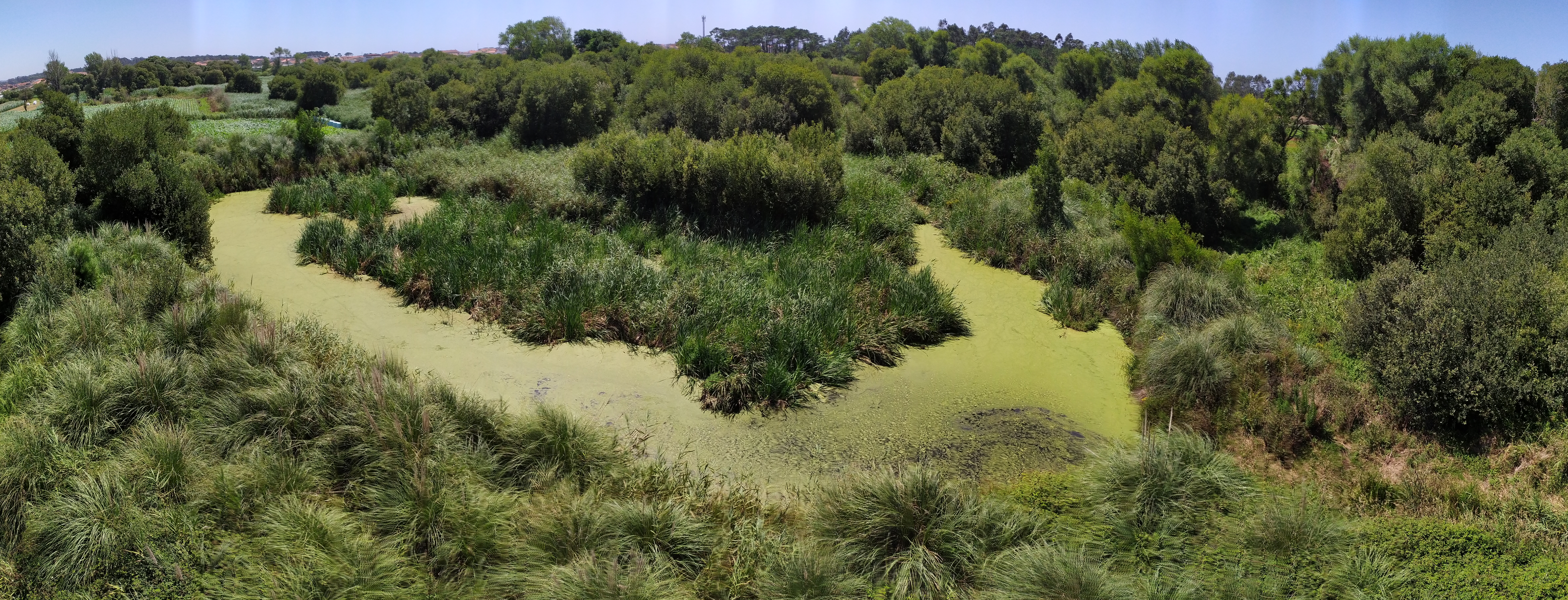

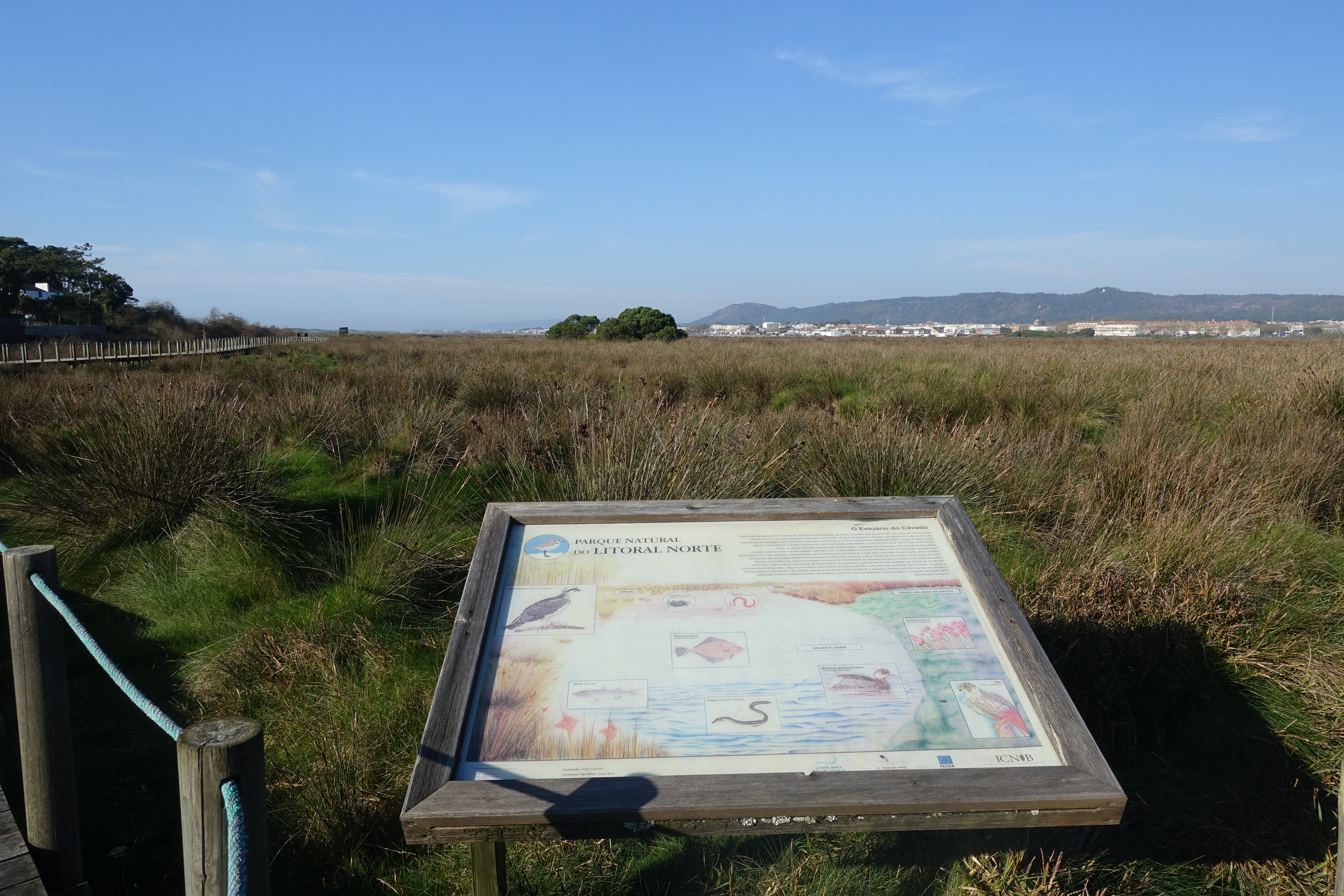
