= Vila Nova de Gaia Municipal Chamber =

Legislative body of Vila Nova de Gaia

Coordinates: 41.13001°N 8.60663°W

Vila Nova de Gaia Municipal Chamber Câmara Municipal de Vila Nova de Gaia
- Coat of arms of the city of Vila Nova de Gaia

Type
- Type: Câmara municipal
- Term limits: 3

History
- Founded: 16 May 1832; 193 years ago

Leadership
- President: Eduardo Vítor Rodrigues, PS since 20 October 2021
- Vice President: Patrocínio Azevedo, PS since 20 October 2021

Structure
- Seats: 11
- Political groups: Municipal Executive (9) PS (9) Opposition (2) PSD (2)
- Length of term: Four years

Elections
- Last election: 26 September 2021
- Next election: Sometime between 22 September and 14 October 2025

Meeting place
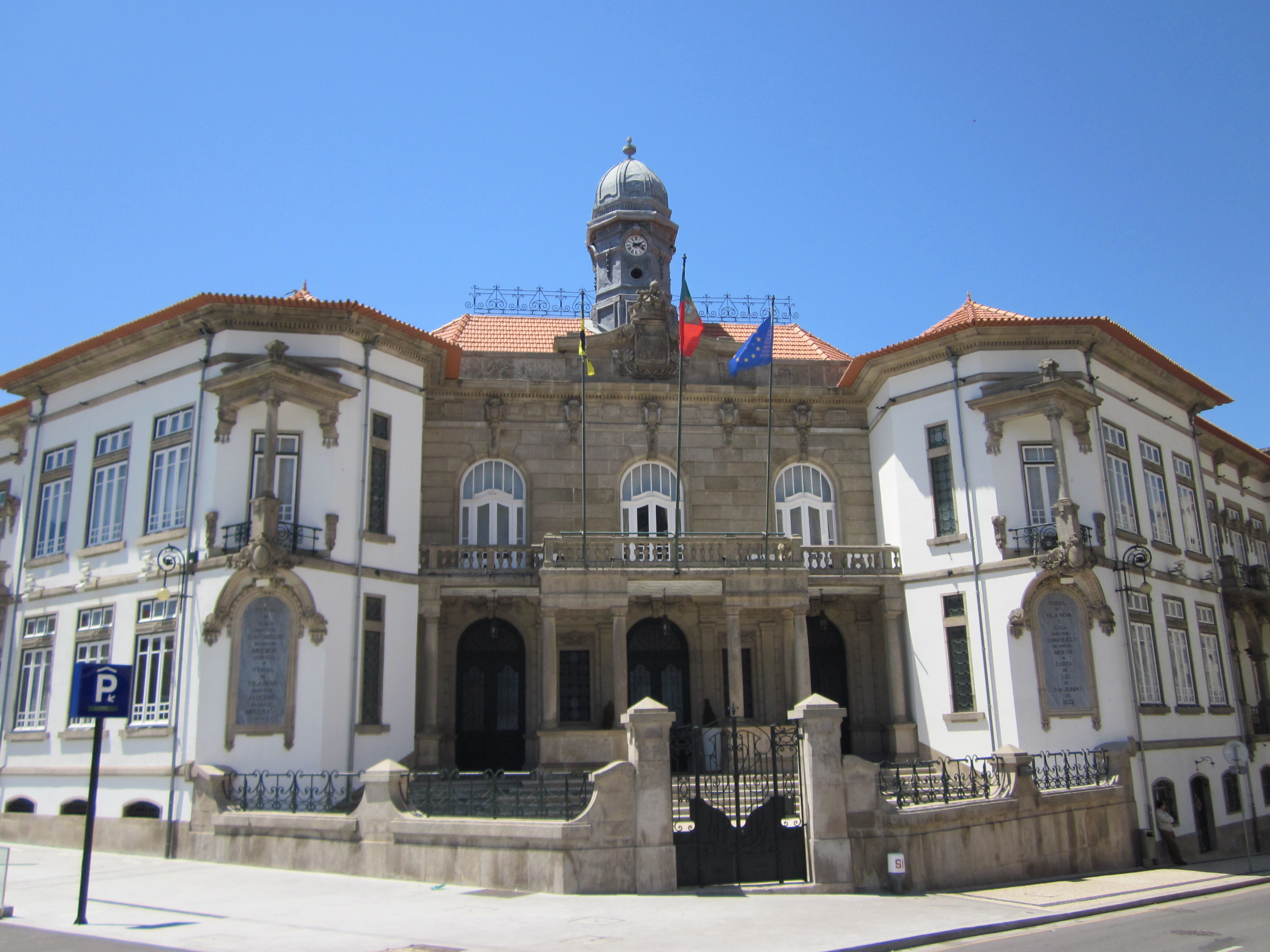
- Paços do Concelho de Vila Nova de Gaia

Website
- www.cm-gaia.pt/pt//

The Vila Nova de Gaia Municipal Chamber (Portuguese: Câmara Municipal de Vila Nova de Gaia) is the administrative authority in the municipality of Vila Nova de Gaia. It has 15 freguesias in its area of jurisdiction and is based in the city of Vila Nova de Gaia, on the Porto District. These freguesias are: Arcozelo, Avintes, Canelas, Canidelo, Grijó e Sermonde, Gulpilhares e Valadares, Madalena, Mafamude e Vilar do Paraíso, Oliveira do Douro, Pedroso e Seixezelo, Sandim, Olival, Lever e Crestuma, Santa Marinha e São Pedro da Afurada, São Félix da Marinha, Serzedo e Perosinho and Vilar de Andorinho.

The Vila Nova de Gaia City Council is made up of 11 councillors, representing, currently, two different political forces. The first candidate on the list with the most votes in a municipal election or, in the event of a vacancy, the next candidate on the list, takes office as President of the Municipal Chamber.

== List of the Presidents of the Municipal Chamber of Vila Nova de Gaia ==
- António da Rocha Leão – (1834)
- António Ribeiro da Costa – (1834–1836)
- Félix Bernardo França Pereira de Castro – (1836–1837)
- António Ribeiro da Costa – (1837–1838)
- Manuel Gonçalves de Castro – (1838–1839)
- Viscount of Oliveira – (1839–1840)
- Joaquim da Cunha Lima de Oliveira Leal – (1840–1841)
- Miguel Joaquim de Moura Coutinho de Lacerda Abreu e Lima – (1841–1845)
- Viscount of Santo António do Vale da Piedade – (1845–1846)
- Joaquim Veloso da Cruz – (1846)
- Manuel Gonçalves de Castro – (1846–1847)
- Manuel Pereira Soares – (1847)
- José Plácido Campeão – (1847)
- Antero Albano da Silveira Pinto – (1847–1851)
- Baron of Corvo – (1851–1852)
- Joaquim Veloso da Cruz – (1852–1856)
- Viscount of Devesas – (1856–1858)
- Joaquim Veloso da Cruz – (1858–1864)
- Viscount of Proença Vieira – (1864–1868)
- Antero Albano da Silveira Pinto – (1868–1870)
- Viscount of Devesas – (1870–1876)
- Luís António Pingo de Aguiar – (1876–1878)
- Diogo Leite Pereira de Melo de Sousa Teixeira Alcoforado – (1878–1880)
- Caetano de Melo Menezes e Castro – (1880–1882)
- Diogo Leite Pereira de Melo de Sousa Teixeira Alcoforado – (1882–1886)
- Caetano de Melo Menezes e Castro – (1886–1890)
- António Joaquim dos Reis Castro Portugal – (1890–1892)
- António Narciso de Azevedo Magalhães – (1892–1893)
- Jaime Teixeira da Mota e Silva – (1893–1896)
- António Narciso de Azevedo Magalhães – (1896–1899)
- Agostinho de Almeida Rego – (1899–1902)
- Joaquim Augusto da Silva Magalhães – (1902–1908)
- Agostinho de Almeida Rego – (1908)
- Joaquim Augusto da Silva Magalhães – (1908–1910)
- Manuel Ferreira de Castro – (1910)
- Inocêncio Osório Lopes Gondim – (1910–1911)
- Francisco José Ferreira Guimarães – (1911–1912)
- Alfredo Torcato de Seixas Bandeira – (1912–1914)
- António Teixeira Pinto – (1914–1916)
- Miguel Joaquim da Silva Leal Júnior – (1916–1918)
- Ernesto Rodolfo Alves de Castro – (1918–1919)
- Agostinho de Almeida Rego – (1919)
- Alberto Júlio Pereira – (1919)
- Alberto da Conceição Teixeira – (1919–1920)
- João Pinto de Azevedo – (1920–1922)
- José Soares de Oliveira – (1923)
- Ângelo Mendonça da Cunha Morais – (1823–1925)
- Miguel Joaquim da Silva Leal Júnior – (1926)
- Augusto António de Macedo Pinto – (1926–1929)
- Venceslau Fernandes de Figueiredo – (1929–1931)
- José Maria da Silva – (1931–1932)
- Jorge Faria Vieira de Araújo – (1932–1933)
- Joaquim Francisco Correia – (1933)
- José da Fonseca Meneres – (1933–1937)
- Abel Pego Fiúza – (1937–1945)
- Fernando Jorge de Azevedo Moreira – (1945–1955)
- João de Brito e Cunha – (1955–1960)
- Joaquim Alves da Silva – (1960–1963)
- Ramiro Ferreira Marques de Queirós – (1964–1974)
- Alberto Augusto Martins da Silva Andrade – (1974–1975)
- António Coutinho Gonçalves da Fonseca – (1975–1980)
- Hermenegildo José da Silva Tavares – (1980–1983)
- António Coutinho Gonçalves da Fonseca – (1983–1986)
- Mário Pinto Simões – (1986–1990)
- José Heitor Meireles Carvalheiras – (1990–1998)
- Luís Filipe Menezes – (1998–2013)
- Maria Amélia Traça Machado – (2013)
- Eduardo Vítor Rodrigues – (2013–2025)
- Marina Mendes - (2025-2025)
- Luís Filipe Menezes – (2025–2029)
