= Comércio do Porto =

Portuguese daily newspaper

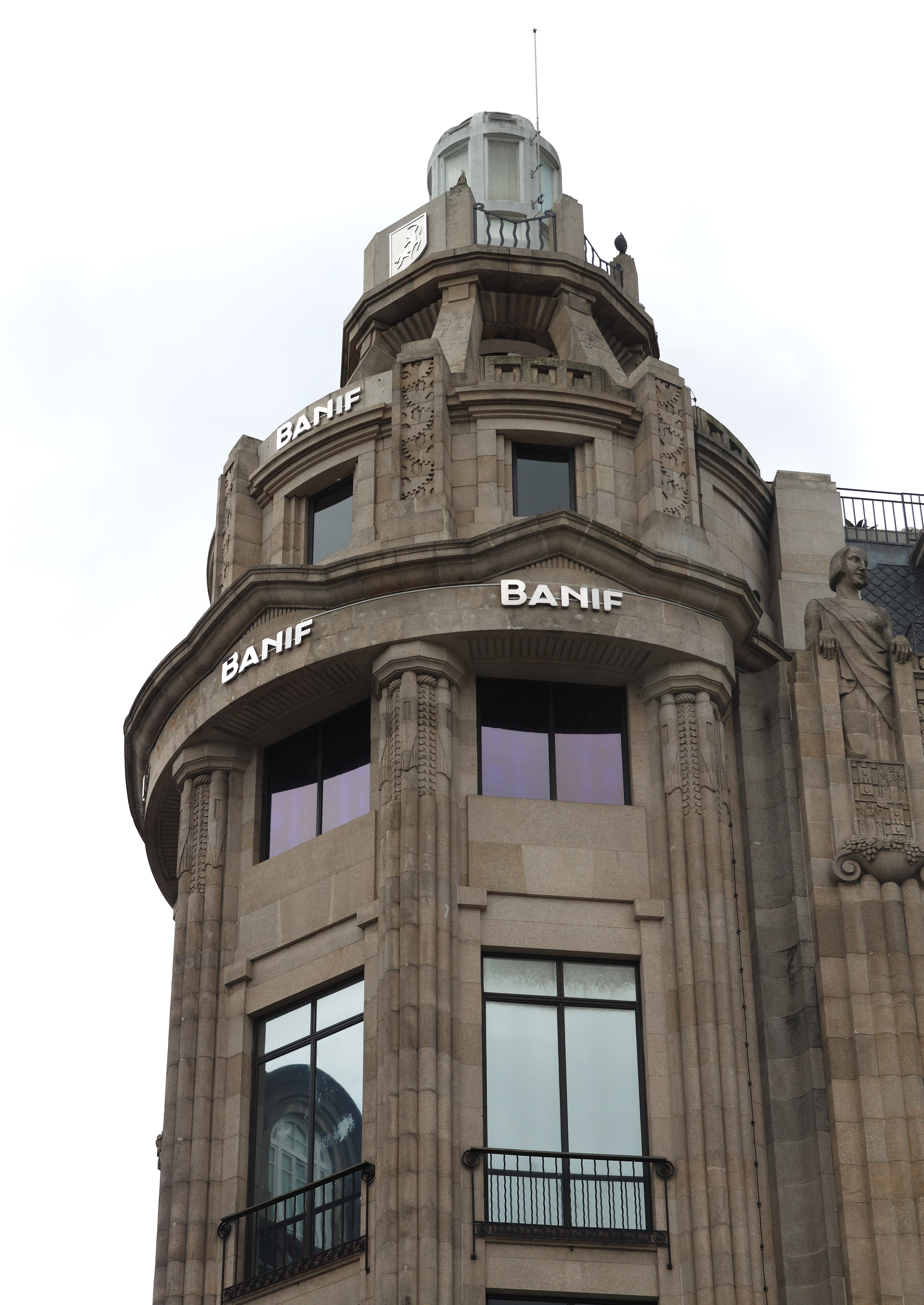
Edifice of the journal's building Avenida dos Aliados, by architect Rogério de Azevedo.

O Comércio do Porto (lit. Porto Trade) was a Portuguese daily newspaper. First appearing in Porto under the title O Commercio in 1854, (Note: Sources differ on the month of the newspaper's first edition. The date of 2 June is given by the Porto Municipal Chamber and by the Lusa News Agency in 2008, whereas a date of 2 July was given by the Lusa News Agency in 2005.) the newspaper folded in 2005 after more than 150 years of continuous publication. At the time of its closure, it was the second-oldest newspaper published in Portugal after O Açoriano Oriental.

== General ==
In the aftermath of the Carnation Revolution in 1974, circulation of O Comércio do Porto reached 120,000 copies before declining during the 1990s, prompting its sale to Spanish media company Prensa Ibérica in 2001. It was published in its later years as a regional newspaper only. The last edition was printed on 30 July 2005. In 2008 an agreement was made between Prensa Ibérica and the city authorities of Vila Nova de Gaia, allowing physical copies of O Comércio do Porto and a collection of several thousand photographs and engravings published in the newspaper over its history to be displayed at the city's Municipal Archive.

Its last director was António Matos.

The estate of the newspaper is expected to be handed over to the Vila Nova de Gaia City Council in November 2008, after the completion of all necessary legal procedures. The protocol stipulates that the estate of O Comércio do Porto will be entrusted to the Municipal Archive of Gaia, remaining the property of the Spanish group Prensa Ibérica (whose main title is the Galician newspaper Faro de Vigo), the owner of O Comércio do Porto.
