= Miramar, Portugal =

Small seaside village

Coordinates: 41°04′N 8°39′W

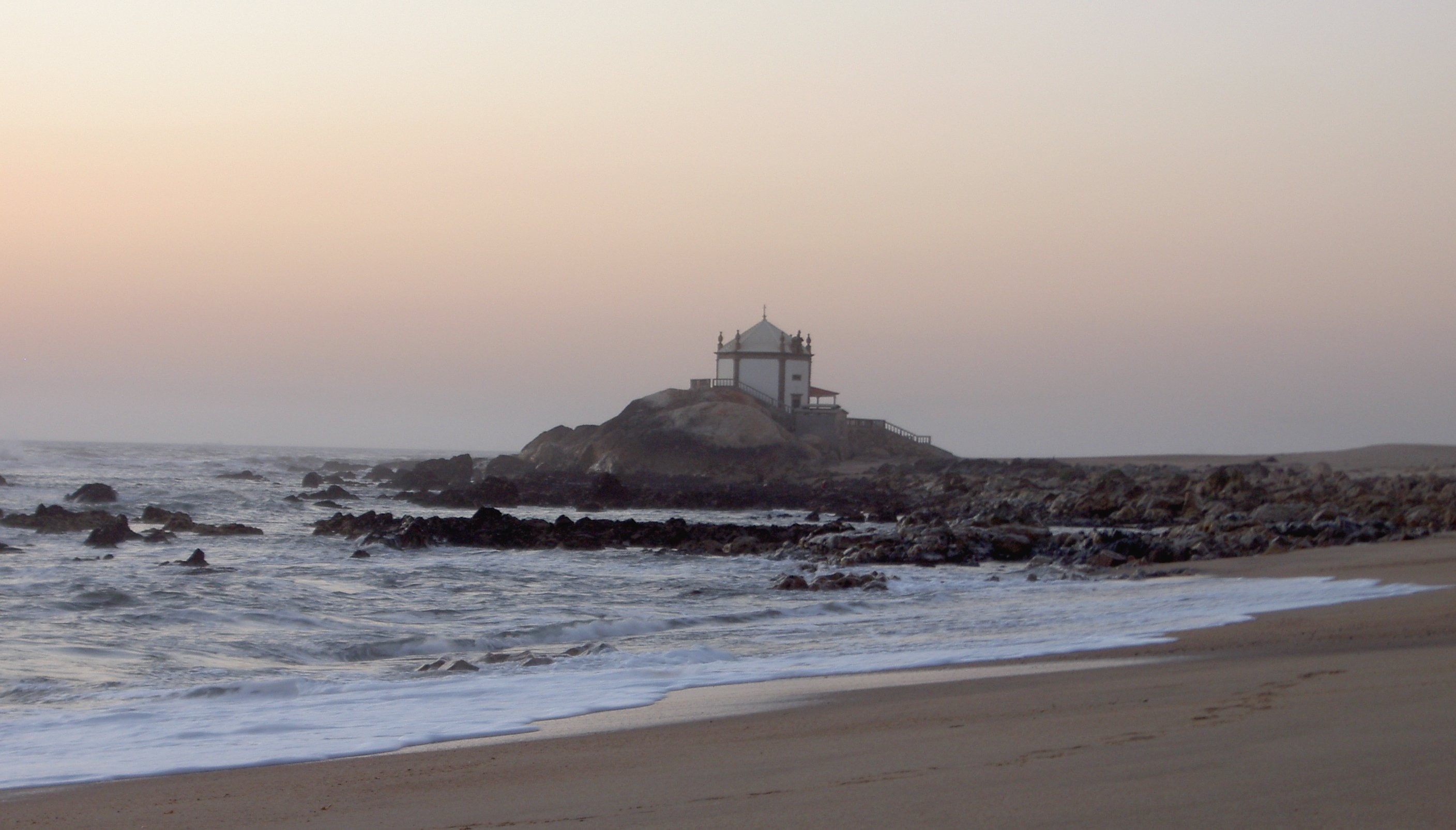
Senhor da Pedra

Miramar is a small seaside village near the towns of Gulpilhares and Arcozelo, in the municipality of Vila Nova de Gaia, in the subregion of Greater Porto, Portugal (Grande Porto).

== About ==
It is an upmarket residential area south of the river Douro, most known for its beach – Praia de Miramar (Miramar Beach) – and the small chapel called Senhor da Pedra (Lord of the Rock), which forms the central attraction of a yearly festival. This chapel is also featured in the film clip "San Simon", directed by Richard Tomes with music by the Pikoul Sisters. Indeed, Miramar is home to a number of artists and intellectuals, including Marina Pikoul and David Wyn Lloyd among others. There are many large houses and mansions in Miramar, as well as in the nearby Praia da Aguda and Praia da Granja. Along the beach, there are several cafés ("esplanadas"). Despite its pleasant location, Miramar is not an international tourist destination. However, during the warm summer months, many Portuguese from the surrounding areas of Porto, Gaia and Espinho spend their days at the beach of Miramar, and also at neighbouring beaches of the Costa Verde.

Although renowned for being a getaway for the elites of Porto during the 20th century, mainly the first half, it has been falling in disarray in the last few decades with unkept roads and sidewalks, a lack of entertainment and leisure, including restaurants, bars and clubs, many abandoned mansions and a decrepit hotel, Hotel Mirassol, the only one serving the municipality, that has been closed and deteriorating since the early 90s.

Recently, a tunnel was built on the main street, Avenida Vasco da Gama, to drive traffic under the railroad, rather than rail crossing, allegedly in compliance with EU directive's, much to public's disapproval and opposition. More than a dozen plane trees, that were close to a hundred years old, were cut down, and the still mostly original train halt, built in the early 20th century, was reduced to just the main building. To this day the roadworks is still yet to be completed with the residents left to deal with damaged dirt roads, basically nonexistent sidewalks, precarious temporary utility poles that are set in the middle of the road and manhole covers left above grade. Excessive road traffic is now the common complaint of the residents which had preferred for the rail crossing to simply be shutdown, since there are two other tunnels that have been recently built nearby already.

== Sports ==
Along the beach of Miramar, there is a small 9-hole golf course called Clube de Golf de Miramar, one of the oldest in the country.

In 1931, Frank Gordon, together with Cláudio Martins and Mário Martins of Vila Nova de Gaia, initiated the creation of a Portuguese golf club at a time when the sport in Portugal was played almost exclusively by the large British community based in Porto. Scottish architect Mackenzie Ross was chosen to design the golf course.

Praia de Miramar, located approximately 10 kilometres south of the Douro River, was selected as the site for the course due to its suitability for golf. The chosen land extended along the coastal dunes, from the northern dune near the chapel of Senhor da Pedra to the beginning of Praia da Aguda in the south.

To the east, the area was bounded by the railway line and the main road, with the terrain extending from the pine forests of Mira down to the sandy beachfront along the Atlantic Ocean.

There is also a private sports club called Sport Clube Alberto de Sousa, locally known as Parque da Gandara, best known for its tennis courts and upscale ambiance, founded in 1930.

The club's early facilities were established on land loaned by Inácio de Sousa, located on Avenida Vasco da Gama in Miramar. The name attributed to the project was reportedly chosen as a gesture of gratitude toward Sousa, in honour of his son, who had died at a young age.

Manuel Menéres, one of the main driving forces behind the project and chairman of the administrative committee, later requested permission from the widow of Alberto Pereira, a returning emigrant from Brazil, to construct a court on land owned by the family, known as Parque da Gândara. The request was approved, and a restaurant was later established in a former caretaker's house on the site.

The club's leadership initially faced difficulties securing funding for the construction of a formal headquarters. On 16 November 1930, the foundation stone for the building was laid, as recorded in the official documentation of the event. Architect Júlio Teixeira Lopes was commissioned to design the planned clubhouse, while builders Fortunato and Henrique agreed to carry out the construction work without upfront payment.

To finance the project, the club's administration combined personal loans from members with a series of fundraising initiatives, including São João festivals, "arraiais minhotos", and social dances. Following the completion of the headquarters, the club increasingly developed into a local centre for social activity and community gatherings.

== Restaurants and Cafés ==
The biggest café/restaurant along the beach of Miramar is the "Areal", which had a café and kiosk facing away from the sea and a restaurant with a view of the beach. In its last iteration it was converted exclusively to a restaurant. The business has undergone several changes of ownership in the last couple decades and even some structural changes. Has been closed for a few years and is currently up for sale.

The other two cafés are Neca's Bar and Bar do Bano, both a main staple of the local beach for more than fifty years.

== Train ==
Miramar (short walk to the village and the beach); suburban trains to Valadares, Vila Nova de Gaia, Porto to the North and Granja, Espinho, Esmoriz, Ovar, Estarreja and Aveiro to the South.

== See also ==
- Tourism in Vila Nova de Gaia
