= Serzedo =

Serzedo may refer to the following places in Portugal:

- Serzedo (Guimarães), a parish in the municipality of Guimarães
- Serzedo, Vila Nova de Gaia, a parish in the municipality of Vila Nova de Gaia
