= Olival =

Olival may refer to the following places in Portugal:

- Olival (Ourém), a civil parish in the municipality of Ourem
- Olival (Vila Nova de Gaia), a civil parish in the municipality of Vila Nova de Gaia
- Olival Basto, a civil parish in the municipality of Odivelas
