= Oliveira do Douro =

Oliveira do Douro may refer to the following places in Portugal:

- Oliveira do Douro (Cinfães), a parish in the Cinfães Municipality
- Oliveira do Douro, Vila Nova de Gaia, a parish in the Vila Nova de Gaia municipality
