= Canidelo =

Canidelo may refer to the following places in Portugal:

- Canidelo, Vila do Conde, a parish in the municipality of Vila do Conde
- Canidelo, Vila Nova de Gaia, a parish in the municipality of Vila Nova de Gaia
