= Praia da Aguda =

Village in Portugal

Coordinates: 41.049°N 8.653°W

Aguda Beach (Praia da Aguda in Portuguese) is a small fishermen village located at about 13 km south of the city of Porto, in Arcozelo, a parish of Vila Nova de Gaia Municipality. It is known for its wide sandy beach (FEE Blue Flag beach) and for its sea waters reach in marine life. Actually its waters are also, highly appreciated for therapeutics due to its high iodine content.

Aguda Beach is one of the most calm and beloved beaches of Porto, and one of the most beautiful beaches of Costa Verde.

== History ==
In mid-nineteenth century Aguda was a small group of wooden barracks that housed the fishermen engaged in the fish capture in this area.

It was the introduction of the railway in 1864, that triggered the development of the small fishing core. With better accessibility the place quickly began to attract more people, especially during the summer, frequenting the beach. Among them, some of the wealthiest families of Porto, that began to build summer mansions on the place.

One of the earliest and most illustrious was Jorge Correia, owner of Vila Palmeira, recently renamed Roses Village (Vila Rosa in Portuguese). Jorge Correia, together with João Gomes da Silva Guerra, a real state builder of the region, were responsible for the urbanization plan of Aguda Beach, that involved the opening of new streets and the replacement of the wooden barracks for stone houses for the fishermen. Thus arose the Rua dos Pescadores (Fishermen Street), the first cluster of whitewashed houses. In 1912 the opening of an avenue linking the railway to the beach, definitely marked the development and urbanization of the place. In 1949 this avenue was named Jorge Correia, in his honour.

== See also ==
- Costa Verde (Portugal)
- Vila Nova de Gaia Municipality
- Porto
