= Lever, Portugal =

Coordinates: 41°04′N 8°29′W

Location of Lever in Vila Nova de Gaia.

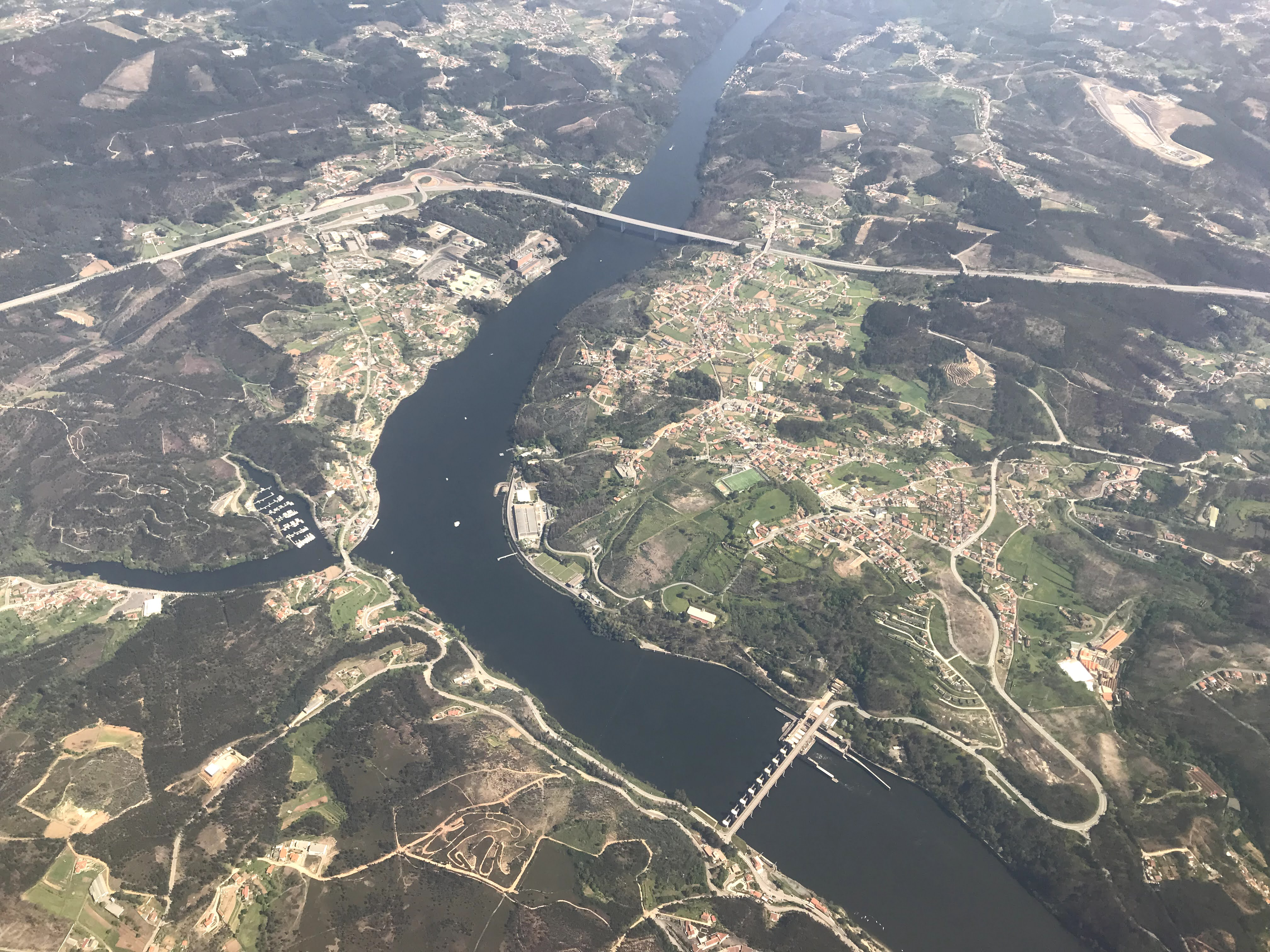
Lever (right hand) and the Douro river

Lever is a former civil parish in the municipality of Vila Nova de Gaia, Portugal. In 2013, the parish merged into the new parish Sandim, Olival, Lever e Crestuma. The population in 2011 was 2,794, in an area of 7.84 km^{2}.
