= Arcozelo (Vila Nova de Gaia) =

- Civil parish
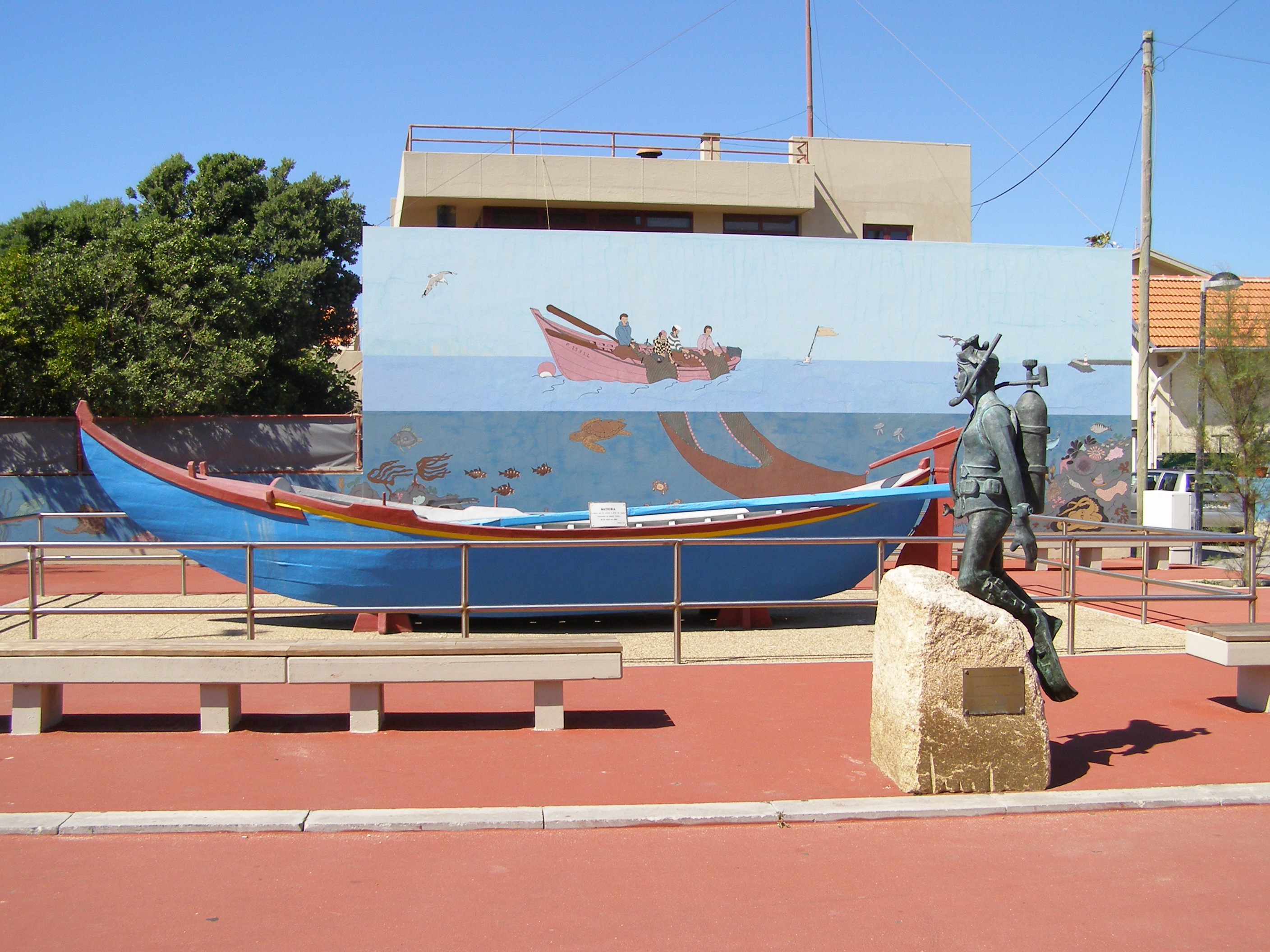
- Traditional fishing boat and a sculpture of a diver, in the beach resort Aguda

- Location in Portugal
- Coordinates: 41.050°N 8.646°W
- Country: Portugal
- Region: Norte
- Metropolitan area: Porto
- District: Porto
- Municipality: Vila Nova de Gaia

Area
  - Total: 8.50 km^{2} (3.28 sq mi)

Population (2011)
  - Total: 14,352
  - Density: 1,690/km^{2} (4,370/sq mi)
- Time zone: UTC+00:00 (WET)
  - Summer (DST): UTC+01:00 (WEST)
- Postal code: 4405
- Patron: São Miguel

Arcozelo is a freguesia in the municipality (concelho) of Vila Nova de Gaia. The population in 2011 was 14,352, in an area of 8.50 km^{2}.

== History ==
Arcozelo's name derives from the Latin words arcoze or arcu celus, both meaning small arch, from the period of the first century.

The parish was a construct of four settlements, Arcozelo, Enxomil, Mira and Vila Chã, which initially went by the name of Santa Maria de Arcozelo, and only much later adopted the name São Miguel de Arcozelo.

Arcozelo is a progressive parish of the municipality of Vila Nova de Gaia, losing many of its origins over time; it is assumed that in 1113, before the founding of the nation, there were references to a settlement of Arcuzello. It was Manuel I of Portugal that first issued a foral (charter), on 30 September 2021, from records in the Forais Novos da Estremadura.

== Geography ==
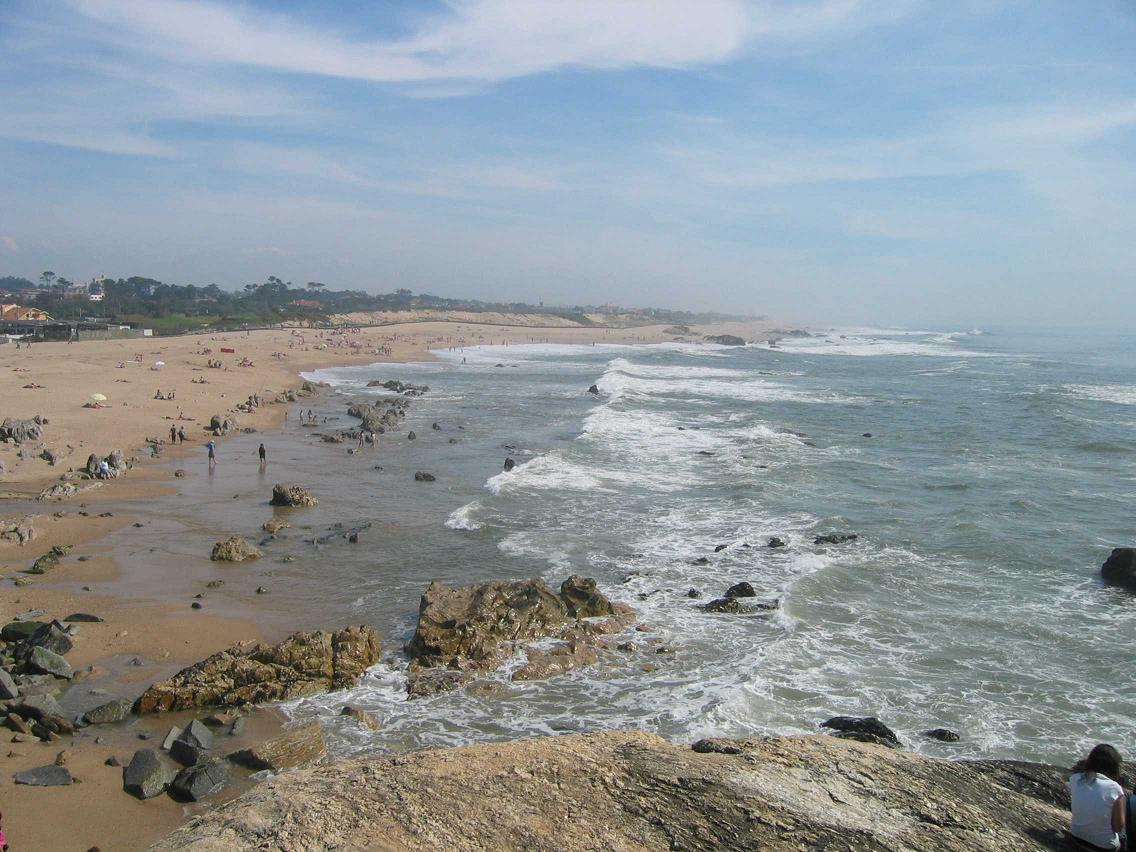
The beach of Praia de Miramar, showing the white fine sand areal

Arcozelo is located 10 kilometres (6.2 mi) from the centre of the municipality of Vila Nova de Gaia, 12 kilometres (7.5 mi) from Porto and about 5 kilometres (3.1 mi) from Espinho, with roadways and raillines providing access to many of the centres of northern and central Portugal, and former province of Douro Litoral. With the ocean on its western frontier, the parish is surrounded in the north by the parish of Gulpilhares, Serzedo in the east and São Félix da Marinha in the south.

The beach of Praia da Aguda is one of the areas most important features, traditionally used by the artesanal fishing fleet, using techniques commonly used during older generations. In order to conserve these older traditions and protect the local marine flora and fauna, the municipal council of Vila Nova de Gaia realized project unheard of in the north: the creation of a Estação Litoral da Aguda (Aguda Coastal Station), that included a Museu das Pescas (Fishing Museum), a public aquarium and departmente responsible for research into marine ecology, aquaculture and fishing (Departamento de Educação e Investigação).

Several of the regions beaches, include Praia da Aguda, Praia de Miramar, Praia das Rosas many of that have long lost their origins, have been converted into Blue Flag-designated beaches, attracting tourists during the summer.

In addition to the civil parish seat, the parish includes several other towns and villages, specifically: Aguda, Aldeia, Boavista, Boavista da Estrada, Chão Velhos, Corga, Corvo, Eirado, Enxomil, Espírito Santo, Fartinha, Fonte, Granja, Igreja, Marinha, Mergunhos, Mira, Miramar, Morangal, Pedra Alva, Pedrinhas Brancas, Porril, Sá, Sobreiro, Vale, Vila Chã e Vila Nova da Telha.

== Economy ==
Situated along the southern coast, Arcozelo's economy had for a long time been influenced by its ties to the sea, with the development of agriculture, commerce and industry developing later, while handicrafts and local goods produced for subsistence, then later, export markets.

== Architecture ==
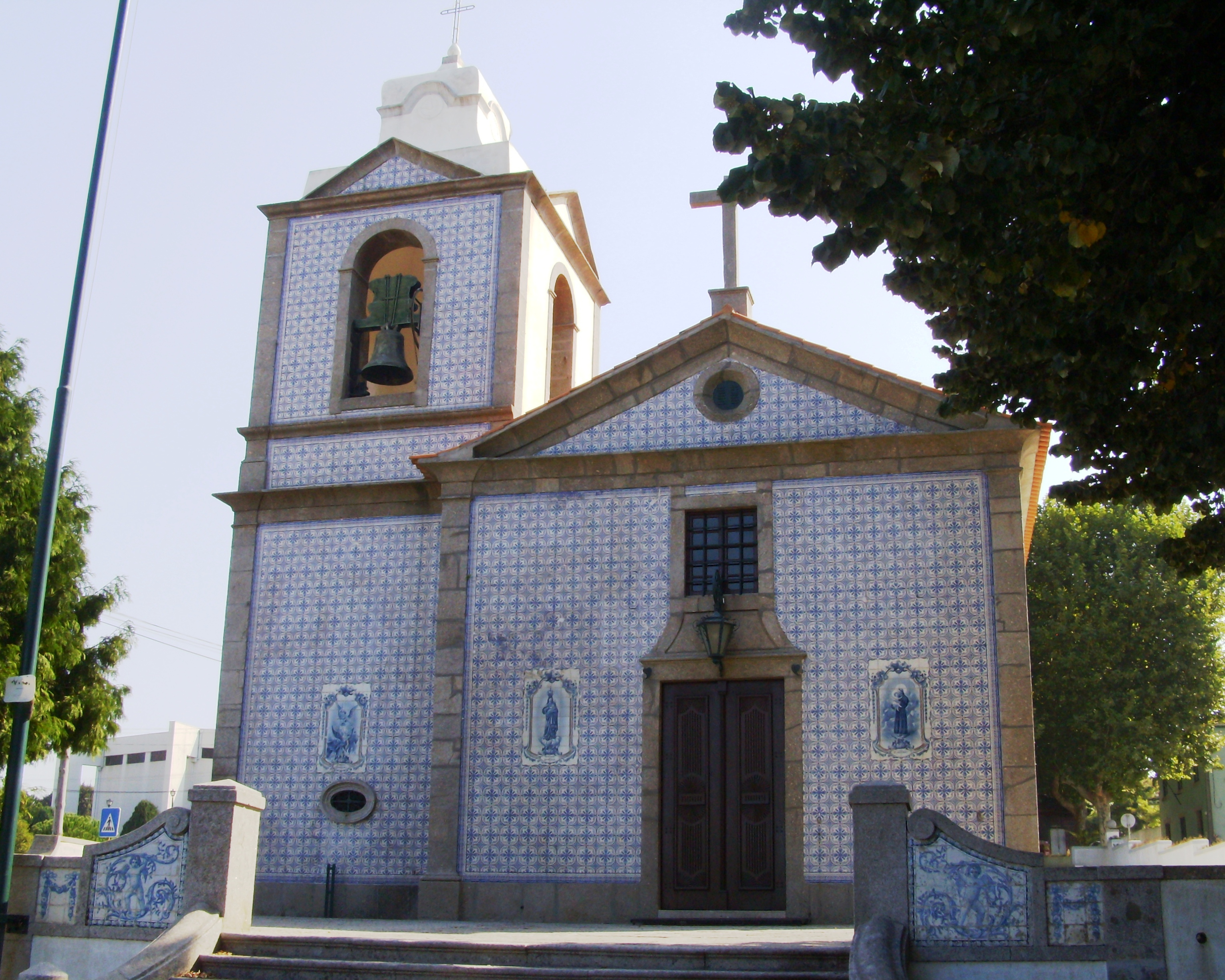
The parochial Church of Arcozelo covered in blue and white azulejo tile

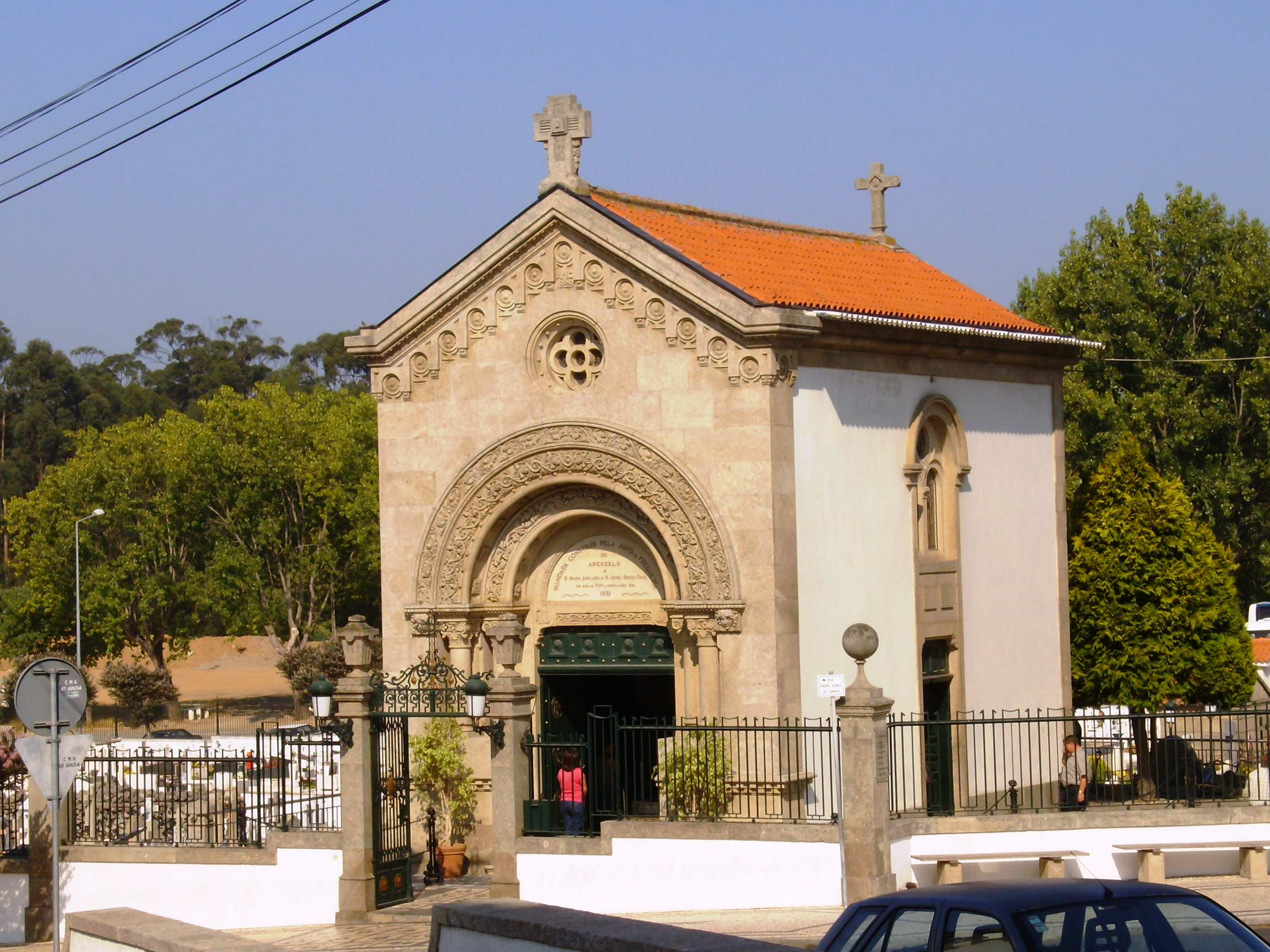
The Chapel-Vault of Maria Adelaide de Sam José e Sousa, also known as Santa Maria Adelaide or Santinha de Arcozelo

With an eye for patrimony, many of the reasons older buildings have been maintained in order to provide a link to the parish's past and/or used as tourist points: the Igreja Matriz (parochial church), constructed in the 17th century; the chapels dedicated to the Holy Spirit and Nossa Senhora da Nazaré, the buildings of Vila Chã and Miramar and the neo-Roman/Byzantine vault of the Santinha, in addition to the estates and burghers homes.

- Chapel of Miramar (Capela de Miramar)
- Chapel of Nossa Senhora da Nazaré (Capela de Nossa Senhora de Nazaré)
- Chapel of Santa Maria Adeleide (Capela de Santa Maria Adelaide), under study at the end of the 20th century, Santa Maria Adelaide, a native Porto, worked in the Convent of Corpus Christi, where she contracted tuberculosis, and moved to Arcozelo to convalesce, where she dedicated herself to a religious life of charity. Following her death miracles were reported, leading to her beatification, meanwhile her body was placed on display so that religious peoples visit on pilgrimages;
- Chapel of Vila Chã (Capela de Vila Chã)
- Chapel of Vila Chã (Capela de Vila Chã)

== Culture ==
Arcozelo is part of religious and devotional pilgrimages annually. There are offerings and supplications to the image of the Santinha de Arcozelo, Maria Adelaide de Sam José e Sousa, who died and was later venerated by the people for her sanctity. On exhibition in her reliquary chapel, the site has been included in annual pilgrimages in the North.

Included in the traditions and folklore of the region of Minho and Douro Litoral, the As Lavradeiras de Santa Maria Adelaide and A Rusga de Arcozelo. In addition there are the popular festivals that maintain the traditional dances and popular songs of the parish, the cantar das janeiras, annual events associated with the matança do porco (slaughtering of the pig), the escapelada do resto, the rusgas ao Senhor da Pedra and other activities that occur throughout the year, and maintain local customs.
