= Sermonde =

Coordinates: 41.049°N 8.586°W

Location of Sermonde in Vila Nova de Gaia.

Sermonde is a former civil parish in the municipality of Vila Nova de Gaia, Portugal. In 2013, the parish merged into the new parish Grijó e Sermonde. The population in 2011 was 1,360, in an area of 1.66 km².
