= Sandim =

Coordinates: 41.037°N 8.514°W

Location of Sandim in Vila Nova de Gaia.

Sandim is a civil parish in the municipality of Vila Nova de Gaia, Portugal. In 2013, the parish merged into the new parish Sandim, Olival, Lever e Crestuma. However, on March 14, 2025, the merged parishes were restored to their original characteristics by Law No. 25-A/2025, and therefore the parish of Sandim was reinstated. The population in 2011 was 5,938. Sandim has a total area of 15,97 km².

== Heritage ==
- Church of Nossa Senhora da Expectação
- Mosteiro das Donas (Monastery of the Ladies)
- Chapels of Senhora da Penha
- Chapel of Nossa Senhora das Neves
- Chapel of Senhor Aflitos
- Section of the Uima River
- Square of Sá
- Archaeological remains of Castros
- Megalithic burial mound of Gestosa
- Chapel of Senhor do Horto
- Chapel of São Gonçalo

== Notable Figures ==
- Gondezinho de Eres
- Martim Mendes de Mogudo (1150–?), Lord of Sandim and of the House of Ermelo.
- Count of Sandim
- Manuel Coelho dos Santos
- Arlindo de Sousa

== Community Organizations ==
These are some institutions that drive cultural, sporting, and social activities for the people of the town:

- Musical Academy of Santa Maria de Sandim
- Casa da Eira Cultural Association
- Mutual Aid Association of Nossa Senhora da Esperança
- Society of Saint Vincent de Paul
- Padre Saúde Foundation
- Modicus
- Columbófila Society
- S.C. Dragões Sandinenses
- Sandim Amateur Theater
- University Union

== Primary Schools ==
- EB1 Gestosa
- EB1 No. 1 Igreja (Church)
- EB1 No. 2 Igreja (Church)
- EB1 Sá
- EB1 Santa Marinha

== Festivals and Pilgrimages ==
- Saint Blaise – celebrated in February in the Mosteiro locality
- São João do Cabo – in the Cabo locality, on the weekend preceding Saint John's Day (June 24), coinciding with the summer solstice
- Nossa Senhora da Saúde – in the Mosteiro locality, celebrated on the weekend preceding the Feast of Nossa Senhora da Saúde (August 15)
- Community Organizations Festival – organized by the local associations in July. Nossa Senhora das Neves in the locality of Calvário is celebrated on the first Sunday of August.
- Senhor dos Aflitos e S. Gonçalo in the locality of Gestosa/Gende are celebrated in May.
