= Perosinho =

Coordinates: 41°04′N 8°35′W

Location of Perosinho in Vila Nova de Gaia.

Perosinho is a former civil parish in the municipality of Vila Nova de Gaia, Portugal. In 2013, the parish merged into the new parish Serzedo e Perosinho. The population in 2011 was 6,359, in an area of 5.29 km².
