= Crestuma =

Coordinates: 41.050°N 8.500°W

Location of Crestuma in Vila Nova de Gaia.

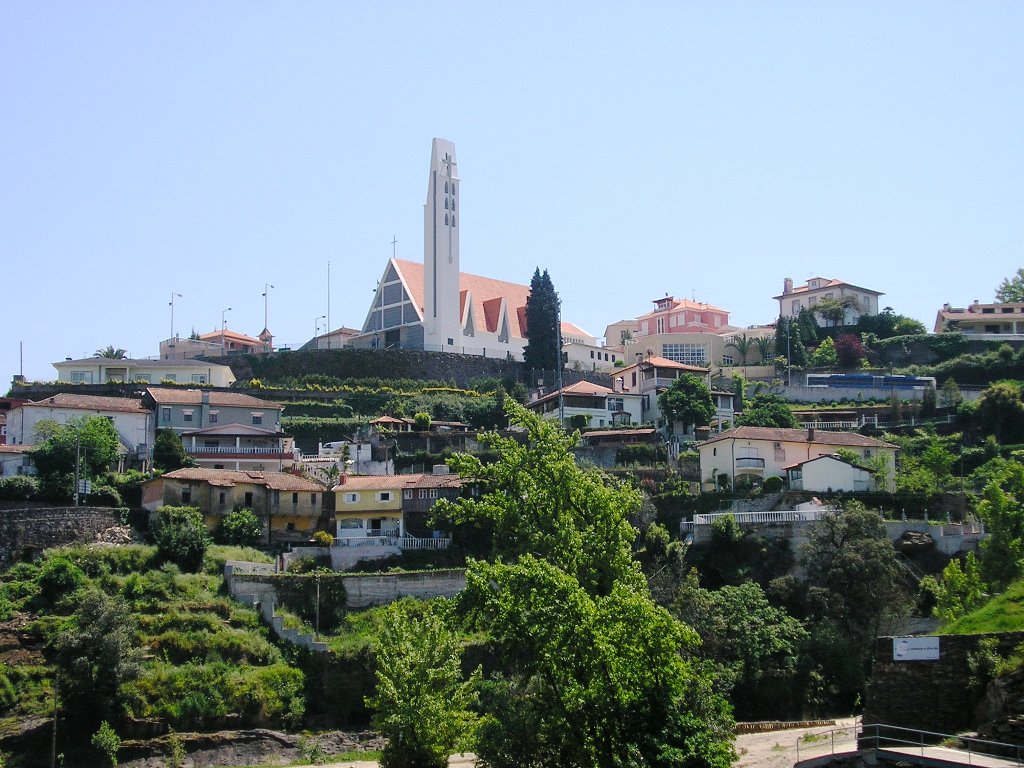
Crestuma church.

Crestuma is a former civil parish in the municipality of Vila Nova de Gaia, Portugal. In 2013, the parish merged into the new parish Sandim, Olival, Lever e Crestuma. The population in 2011 was 2,621, in an area of 4.68 km².
