= Sónia Rocha =

Portuguese cell and molecular biologist

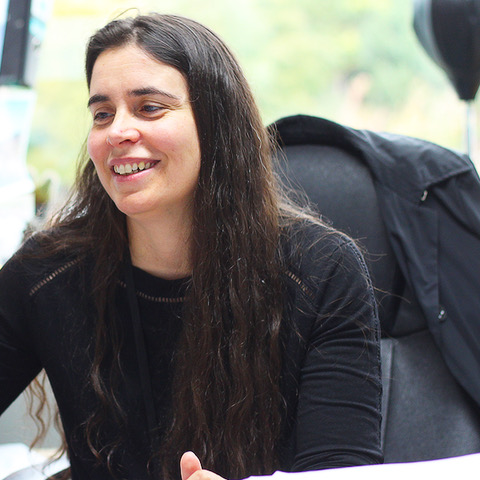
Professor Sonia Rocha

Sónia Maria Campos Soares da Rocha, usually referred to as Professor Sónia Rocha, is a Portuguese cell biologist who holds a personal chair in Biochemistry at the University of Liverpool, where she is a former head of the Department of Biochemistry and was the Founding Dean of the Institute of Systems, Molecular and Integrative Biology. Rocha runs an active multidisciplinary cell signaling research group studying hypoxia, and focused around transcription factors such as Hypoxia-inducible factors and NF-κB. Her laboratory is currently based in the Department of Biochemistry, Cell and Systems Biology, University of Liverpool. In 2024, Professor Rocha was the first female recipient of the Sir Philip Randle Award of the Biochemical Society

== Early life and education ==
Rocha was born in Vila Nova de Gaia, Portugal, and was educated at the University of Porto, where she received the equivalent of a UK first-class honours degree in biology from the Faculty of Science. She subsequently studied for a PhD at the Swiss Federal Institute of Technology ETH Zurich in Zurich, Switzerland, graduating in 2000 after working alongside Martin Pruschy and K. H. Winterhalter.

== Career and research highlights ==
Following her PhD, Rocha took up a postdoctoral research position in the Centre for Gene Regulation and Expression, in the School of Life Sciences at the University of Dundee, where she was supervised by Neil Perkins. In 2005, she was awarded an Independent RCUK Fellowship to continue her work in the molecular basis of transcription, taking up a position as a RCUK fellow and tenure-track principal investigator. She then became a Principal Investigator in 2011, and in the same year, was awarded a prestigious Cancer Research UK senior research fellowship, which was taken up in the Centre for Gene Regulation and Expression, in Dundee between 2011 and 2017. She was deputy director of the Centre for Gene Regulation and Expression, between 2012 and 2017, and was then promoted to professor of molecular and cellular biology in 2016. In July 2017, she took up the position of Head of the Biochemistry Department in the Faculty of Health and Life Sciences at the University of Liverpool, and from 2020 was promoted to become Executive dean of the newly formed Institute of Systems, Molecular & Integrative Biology

Rocha is an experienced undergraduate and postgraduate teacher and convenor, and has delivered courses on cell signalling, genes and cancer module, genes and proteins, and was a lecturer in gene regulation and expression modules at the University of Dundee, including module coordination. As of 2025, she has published >100 peer-reviewed research articles, co-authored multiple peer-reviewed research reviews and contributed to one book chapter. Amongst her most-cited work is the discovery that Hypoxia-Inducible Factor is regulated by NF-κB and a recent paper in Science that demonstrates Hypoxia modulates histone methylation and reprograms chromatin. This paper was published back-to-back with a study co-authored by 2019 Nobel Prize in Physiology or Medicine winner for Medicine William Kaelin Jr. These papers were highlighted in an independent editorial. Other relevant publications include a chemical biology approach to analysing hypoxic signalling, analysis of the targeted degradation of regulation of the oxygen-regulated prolylyl hydroxylase enzyme, also known as Procollagen-proline dioxygenase, and molecular analysis of the regulation of PHD1 by protein phosphorylation.

== Research networks, scientific service and scientific outreach ==
Rocha's funding portfolio includes a Wellcome Trust Collaborative Award in Science, for which she was lead (2017–2022) and significant further PI funding from CRUK, the MRC, the AICR, the Royal Society and BBSRC equipment funding as part of multi-disciplinary applications. Through her international research group, Rocha has supported the research training of many staff and students, graduating 17 PhD students as of 2025, 11 as primary supervisor. She is active in the promotion of science and research to policy makers and the wider scientific community, as evidenced by her position on several committees, including (2019–present) co-chair of the organising committee for the Genes and Cancer meeting, chair of the organising committee for the UK and Ireland NF-kappaB and IKK workshop 2019. (2019–present chair of the LIFE_16 Molecular and Cellular Biology panel, Finnish Science Academy), 2018–present external reviewer for Newcastle University Tenure Track Fellows. Faculty of Medicine, 2018–present member of the Biomedicines editorial board, 2018–present member of the evaluation team for "Fundacion La Caixa" grants, 2017–present member of the editorial advisory board for FEBS Journal, 2017–present. Member of the North West Cancer Research Centre executive committee, 2017–2018 member of the Health and Science, Molecular and cellular Biology panel, Finnish Science Academy. Since 2016, she has been a member of the Henry Dale Fellowship panel Wellcome Trust, was a member of the CRUK travel award panel (2016–2019) and between 2015 and present is a member of the academic editorial board, Scientific Reports. Between 2015 and 2018 she was a member of the Breast Cancer Now scientific advisory board, and between 2013 and 2017. was the head of the SLS University of Dundee MRC PhD programme. Since 2013 she has been a member of the academic editorial board of the open-access journal PLOS One. Since 2008, she has been a member of the editorial advisory board of the Biochemical Journal. Rocha has given over 50 invited seminars at universities across the world. She has also acted as an external examiner at a number of UK universities, including Belfast University, University of Oulu, Finland, University of Barcelona, Imperial College London, University of Cambridge and Newcastle University.

== Awards and honours ==
Rocha was an invited member of the Research Excellence Framework 2021 sub-panel for UoA5, and an elected Fellow of the Royal Society of Biology. She was the recipient of both an Independent Cancer Research UK senior fellowship and an Independent RCUK Junior Fellowship In 2011, her 2008 Biochemical Journal paper was awarded 'paper of the year' in the Biochemical Journal-Gene section and in 2009, her citation classic on the subject of gene regulation by hypoxia was cited as the most cited paper of the year in the Biochemical Journal. In 2008, Rocha also received the 'outstanding achievement' award, at both the 13th World Congress on Advances in Oncology and the 11th International Symposium on Molecular Medicine. Greece. In 2025, Rocha was awarded the Sir Philip Randle by the Biochemical Society, for her outstanding contribution to the understanding of mammalian metabolism. Rocha has also been selected to be part of REF 2029 UoA5 sub-panel.
