= Vilar de Andorinho =

- Civil parish
- Location in Portugal
- Coordinates: 41.105°N 8.573°W
- Country: Portugal
- Region: Norte
- Metropolitan area: Porto
- District: Porto
- Municipality: Vila Nova de Gaia

Area
  - Total: 7.07 km^{2} (2.73 sq mi)

Population (2011)
  - Total: 18,155
  - Density: 2,570/km^{2} (6,650/sq mi)
- Time zone: UTC+00:00 (WET)
  - Summer (DST): UTC+01:00 (WEST)

Vilar de Andorinho is a Portuguese parish in the municipality of Vila Nova de Gaia. The population in 2011 was 18,155, in an area of 7.07 km^{2}.

== See also ==
- Saint of Vilar
