= Sandim, Olival, Lever e Crestuma =

- Civil parish
- Location in Portugal
- Coordinates: 41.05°N 8.51°W
- Country: Portugal
- Region: Norte
- Metropolitan area: Porto
- District: Porto
- Municipality: Vila Nova de Gaia

Area
  - Total: 34.16 km^{2} (13.19 sq mi)

Population (2011)
  - Total: 17,168
  - Density: 502.6/km^{2} (1,302/sq mi)
- Time zone: UTC+00:00 (WET)
  - Summer (DST): UTC+01:00 (WEST)

Sandim, Olival, Lever e Crestuma is a former civil parish in the municipality of Vila Nova de Gaia, Portugal. It was formed in 2013 by the merger of the former parishes Sandim, Olival, Lever and Crestuma. However, on March 14, 2025, the merged parishes were restored to their original characteristics by Law No. 25-A/2025, and therefore the parish of Sandim was reinstated. The population in 2011 was 17,168, in an area of 34.16 km².
