= Vila Nova de Gaia =

- Municipality
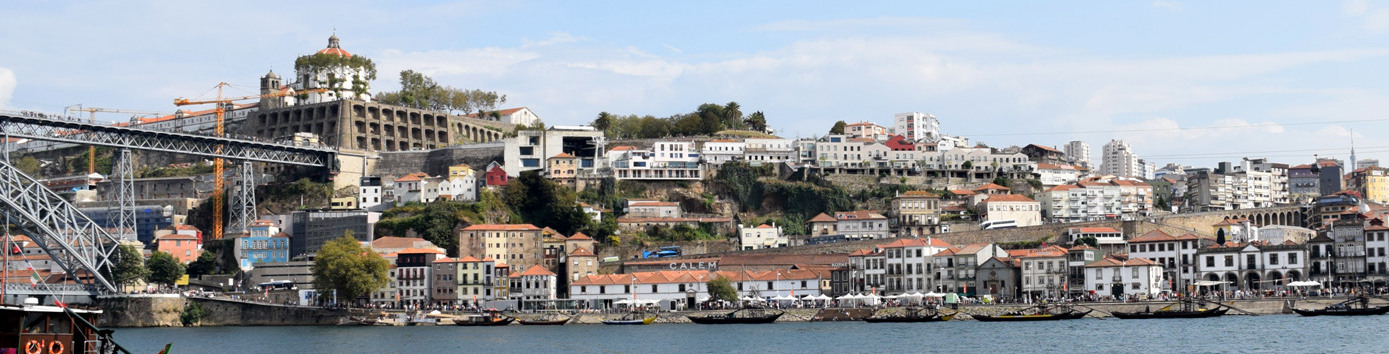
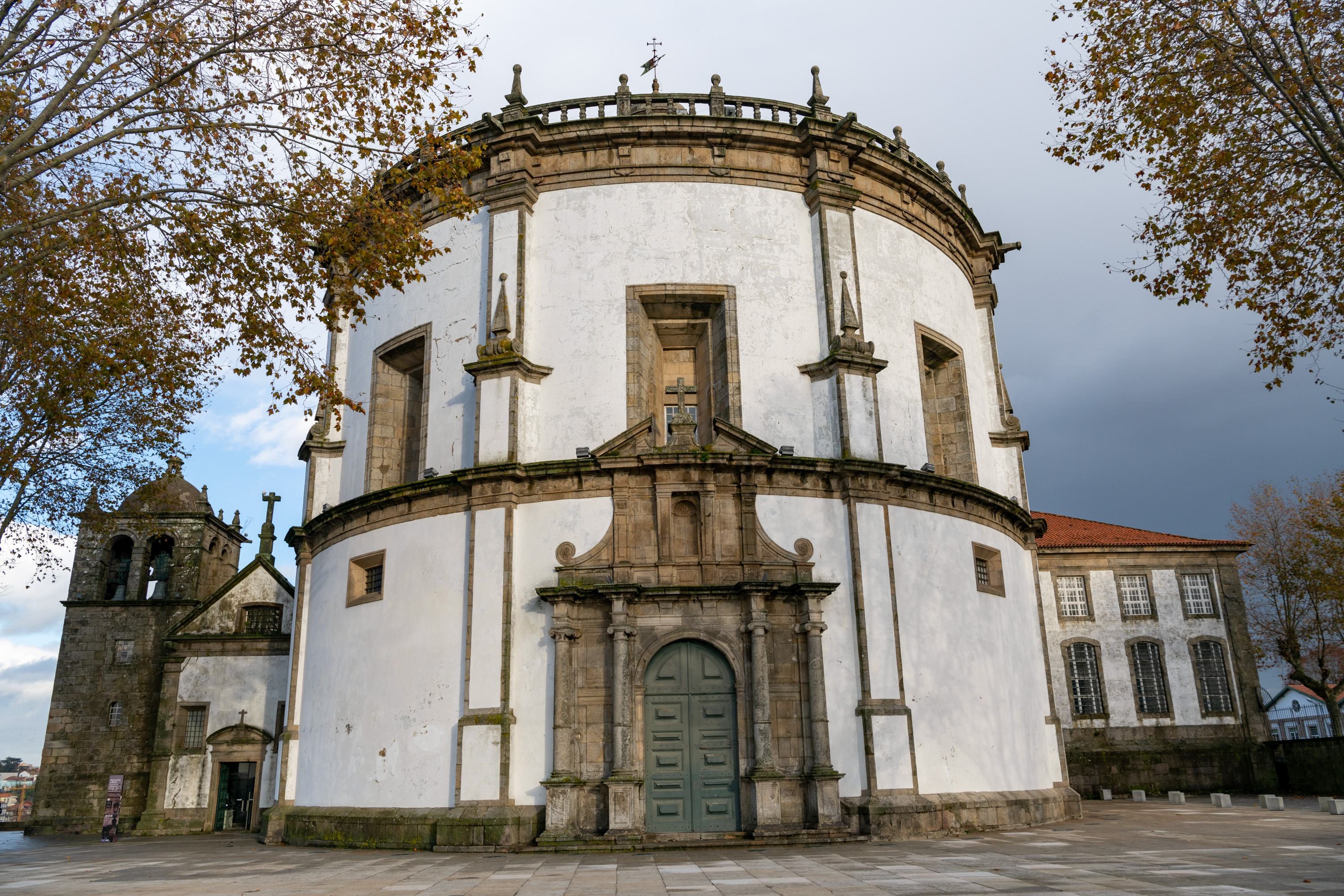
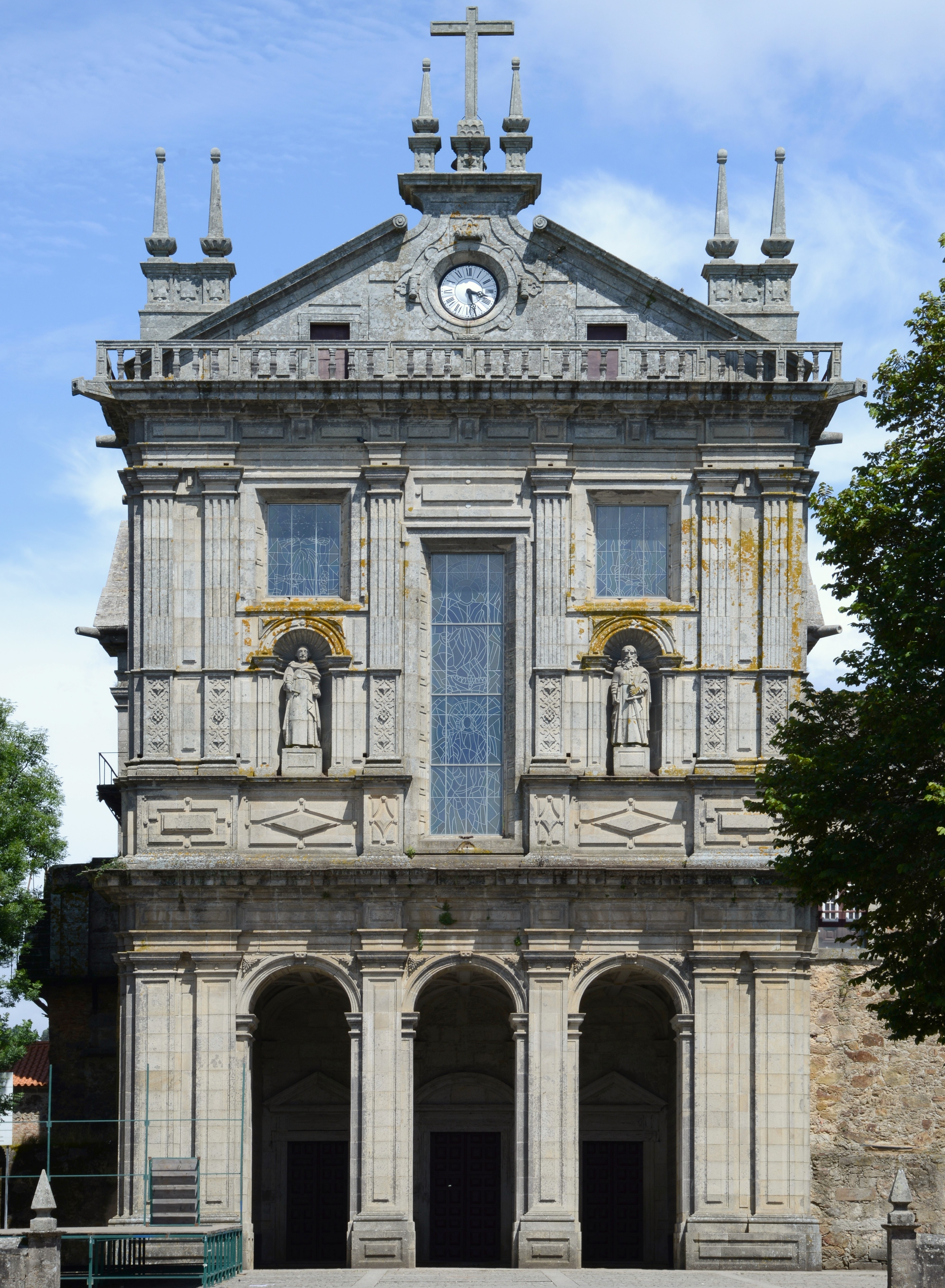
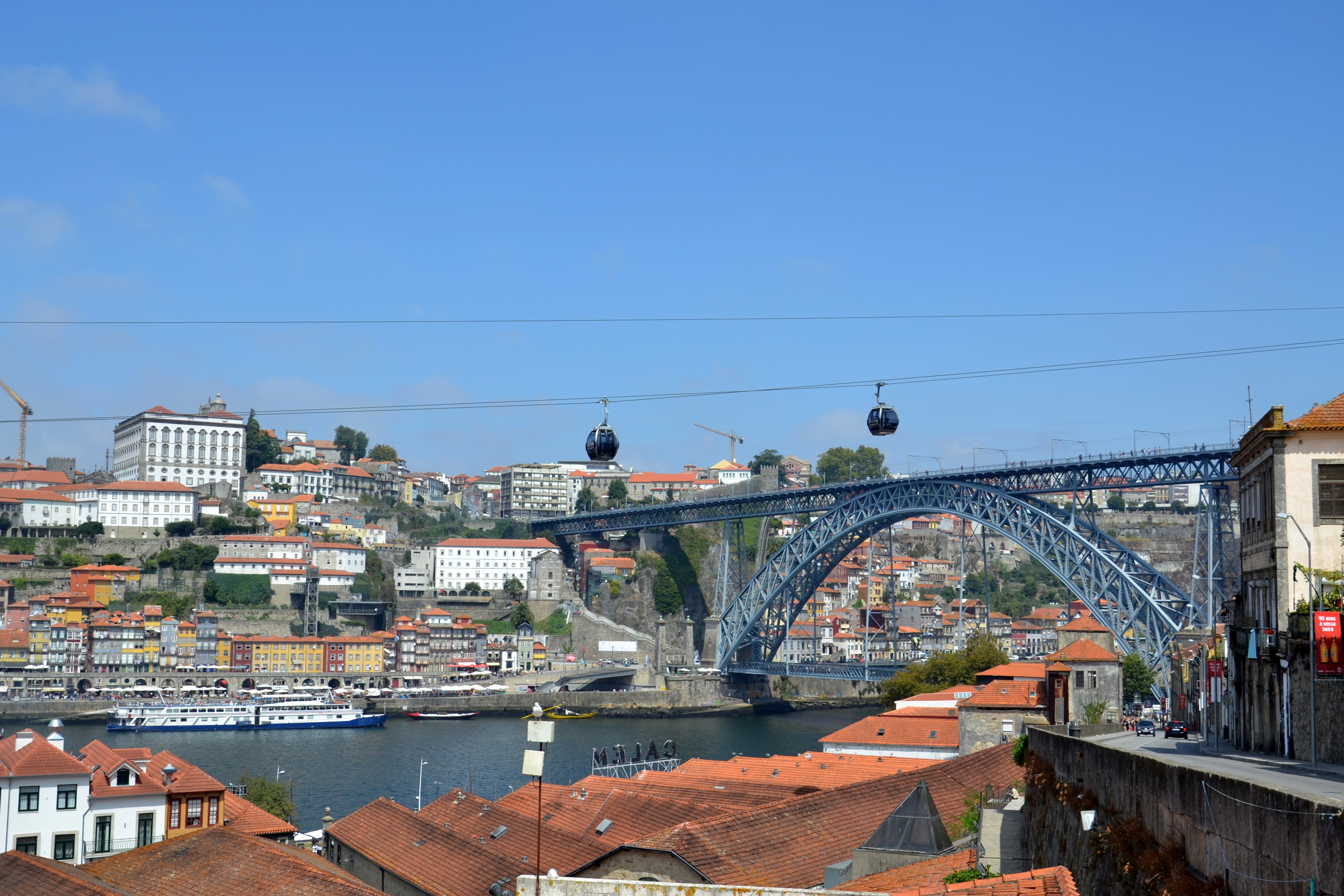
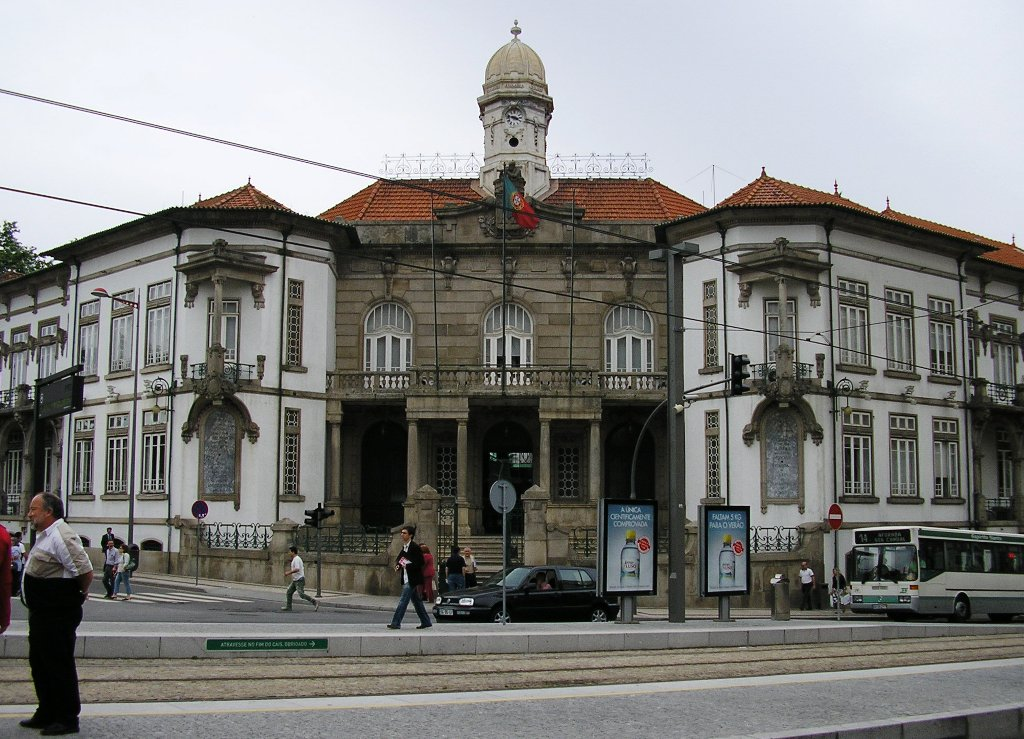
- View from the Douro River Monastery of Serra do Pilar Monastery of São Salvador de Grijó Luiz I Bridge City council

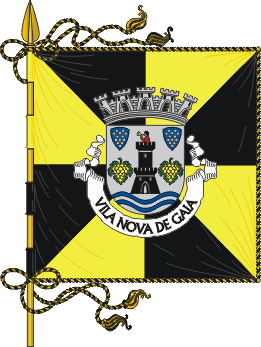
- Flag Coat of arms
- Interactive map of Vila Nova de Gaia
- Location in Portugal
- Coordinates: 41°08′N 8°37′W
- Country: Portugal
- Region: Norte
- Metropolitan area: Porto
- District: Porto
- Seat: Vila Nova de Gaia Municipal Chamber
- Parishes: 24

Government
  - President: Luís Filipe Menezes (PSD)

Area
  - Total: 168.46 km^{2} (65.04 sq mi)

Population (2021)
  - Total: 178,255
  - Rank: 3rd
  - Density: 1,058.1/km^{2} (2,740.6/sq mi)
  - Municipality: 303,824
- Time zone: UTC+00:00 (WET)
  - Summer (DST): UTC+01:00 (WEST)
- Website: www.cm-gaia.pt

Vila Nova de Gaia (European Portuguese: [ˈvilɐ ˈnɔvɐ ðɨ ˈɣajɐ]), or simply Gaia, is a city and a municipality in Porto District in Norte Region, Portugal. It is located south of the city of Porto on the other side of the Douro River. The city proper had a population of 178,255 in 2001. The municipality has an area of 168.46 square kilometres (65.04 mi^{2}) and a population of 303,824 inhabitants in 2021, making it the most populous municipality in Norte Region, and the third most populous in the country, after Lisbon and Sintra. Gaia along with Porto and 16 other municipalities make up the Porto metropolitan area.

The city contains many cellars (locally known as "caves") where port wine is stored and aged. These cellars have become a major tourist attraction.

== History ==
=== Origins and Roman era ===
The territory of Vila Nova de Gaia has been inhabited since at least 100,000 years ago, as evidenced by Middle Paleolithic archaeological findings. This presence continued through the Chalcolithic period, marked by the construction of barrows, and the Bronze Age, as demonstrated by the settlement at Alto da Vela in Gulpilhares. During the Iron Age, hillforts (castros) were established, including the Castro do Monte Murado in Pedroso, where two bronze plaques inscribed with Latin text (tesserae hospitales) were found. These plaques record a hospitality pact between the Turduli Veteres, the local ethnic group and the newly arrived Romans.

Under Roman rule, the area, known as Cale (Proto-Celtic: *Cale), gained strategic importance due to its location near the mouth of the Douro River and the road connecting Olisipo (Lisbon) and Bracara Augusta (Braga). Fortified settlements such as the Castles of Gaia Crestuma were established to control trade along the river. Cale likely originated from a preexistent Celtic settlement.

During this time, most of the population likely resided south of the Douro River, with a smaller settlement on the northern bank around a deep-water port in what is now Porto's Ribeira neighbourhood. This northern settlement, known as Portus Cale (the "port" of Cale, source of the name "Portugal"), grew in prominence over time due to the thriving Douro River trade, attracting the clergy and the merchant class.

=== Middle Ages and early modern period ===
Between the 5th and 7th centuries, under the rule of the Suebi and Visigoths, the region's largest population centers were Portucale Castrum antiqum (Gaia) and Portucale Castrum nuovum (Porto). Christianity became firmly established in the area during this period, particularly after the arrival of Martin of Braga in 550, as evidenced by paleochristian remains found in the castles of Gaia and Crestuma.

In the 8th century, the Moorish invasions shifted the frontier between Islamic and Christian territories to the Douro River. With the constant raids and counter-raids, the town of Cale, or Gaia, was deserted and most of its inhabitants took refuge in Porto in the North side of the river. This era also saw the emergence of the Lenda de Gaia (Legend of Gaia), a late medieval legend set in the 10th century.

Following the Christian reconquest of the Douro's southern bank after 1035, semi-abandoned fertile lands were resettled by colonists from the north, who were drawn by favorable feudal contracts. The combined cities of Porto and Gaia were often referred to in contemporary documents as "villa de Portucale." The Leonese County of Portucale (Condado Portucalense), centered on this region, would eventually expand and gain independence, forming the Kingdom of Portugal.

By the 13th century, Vila Nova de Gaia was an established administrative and judicial territory, known as the jurisdiction (julgado) of Gaia. It encompassed the parishes of Arcozelo, Avintes, Canelas, Canidelo, Grijó, Guetim, Gulpilhares, Madalena, Mafamude, Olival, Oliveira do Douro, Perosinho, Santa Marinha, São Félix da Marinha, Seixezelo, Serzedo, Valadares, Vilar de Andorinho, and Vilar do Paraíso. In 1255, King Afonso III granted a royal charter (foral) to the settlement at the Castle of Gaia, hoping to promote the area as an harbour for cargo entering the river. Later, in 1288, King Denis and Queen Elizabeth issued a charter for the nearby lower settlement, known as Burgo Velho do Porto, renaming it Vila Nova de Rey, with the intent of concentrating the wine trade Gaia. In 1302, King Denis also established a fair in Vila Nova de Rey.

During this period, significant institutions were founded, including the Corpus Christi Convent in 1345 by Maria Mendes Petite. Medieval Gaia also had ties to Portugal's first university, the University of Coimbra, as the abbot of the church of St. Marinha (igreja de Santa Marinha) renounced certain revenues to support its establishment. Additionally, King Pedro I briefly established the municipality of Canidelo in 1363 in honor of his beloved Inês de Castro, though it was dissolved in 1375.

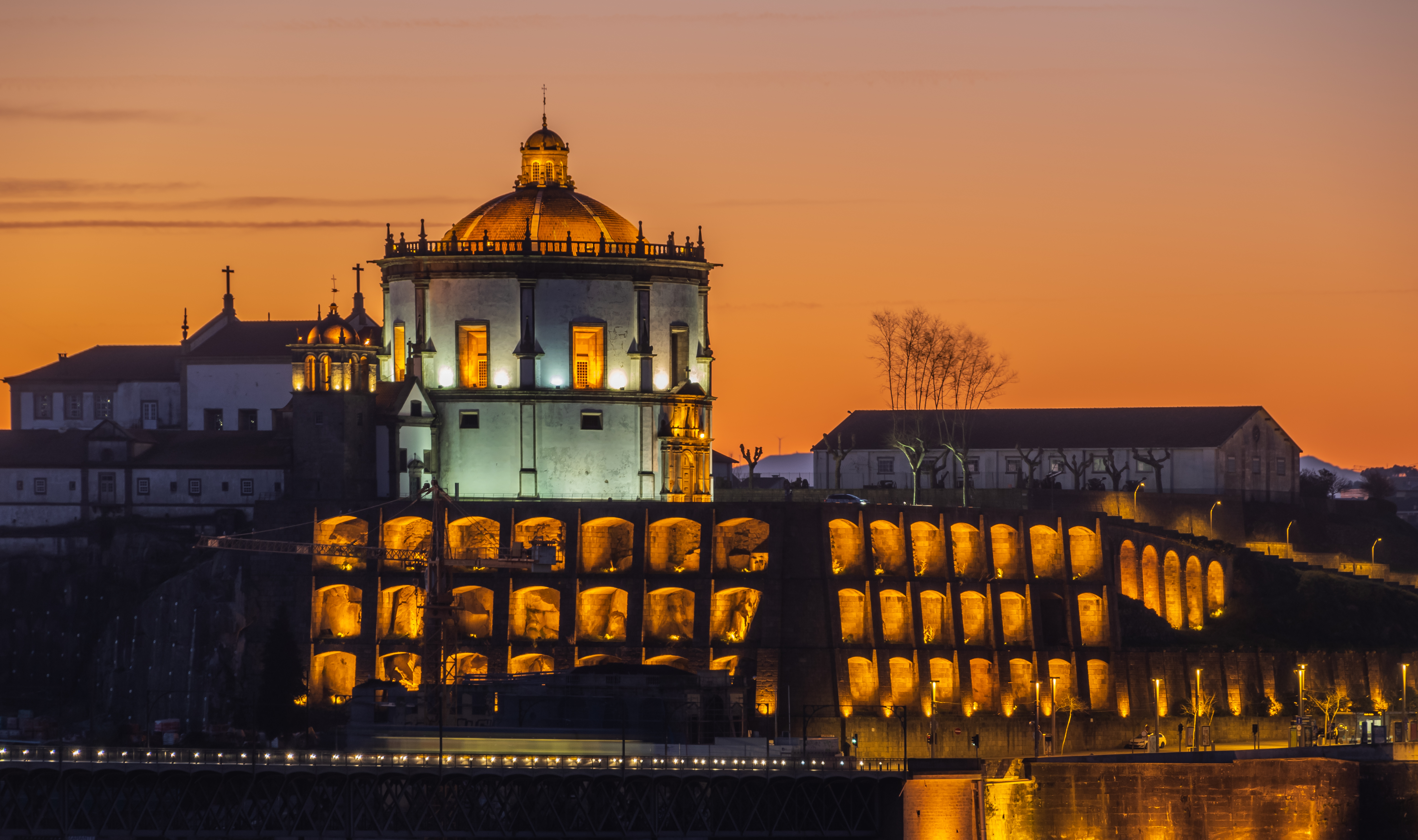
Monastery of Serra do Pilar

Following the 1383–1385 interregnum, the municipalities of Gaia and Vila Nova de Rey were integrated into the broader Porto Territory (Termo do Porto), an administrative division governed from Porto. While the municipalities retained some local governance, much of their administrative, judicial, and ecclesiastical control shifted to Porto. During this period, Gaia would also lose control over the wine trade, to the city of Porto. In 1518, King Manuel I issued a new foral, reaffirming the administrative structure of Vila Nova de Gaia while codifying its municipal privileges and duties. During this period, the territory of the municipality was under the influence of a combination of noble families, such as the Cernaches and the Sás, the king and religious institutions, such as the Diocese of Porto and the Grijó Monastery, which founded the Monastery of Serra do Pilar. This arrangement continued until the reorganization of municipal territories in the 19th century.

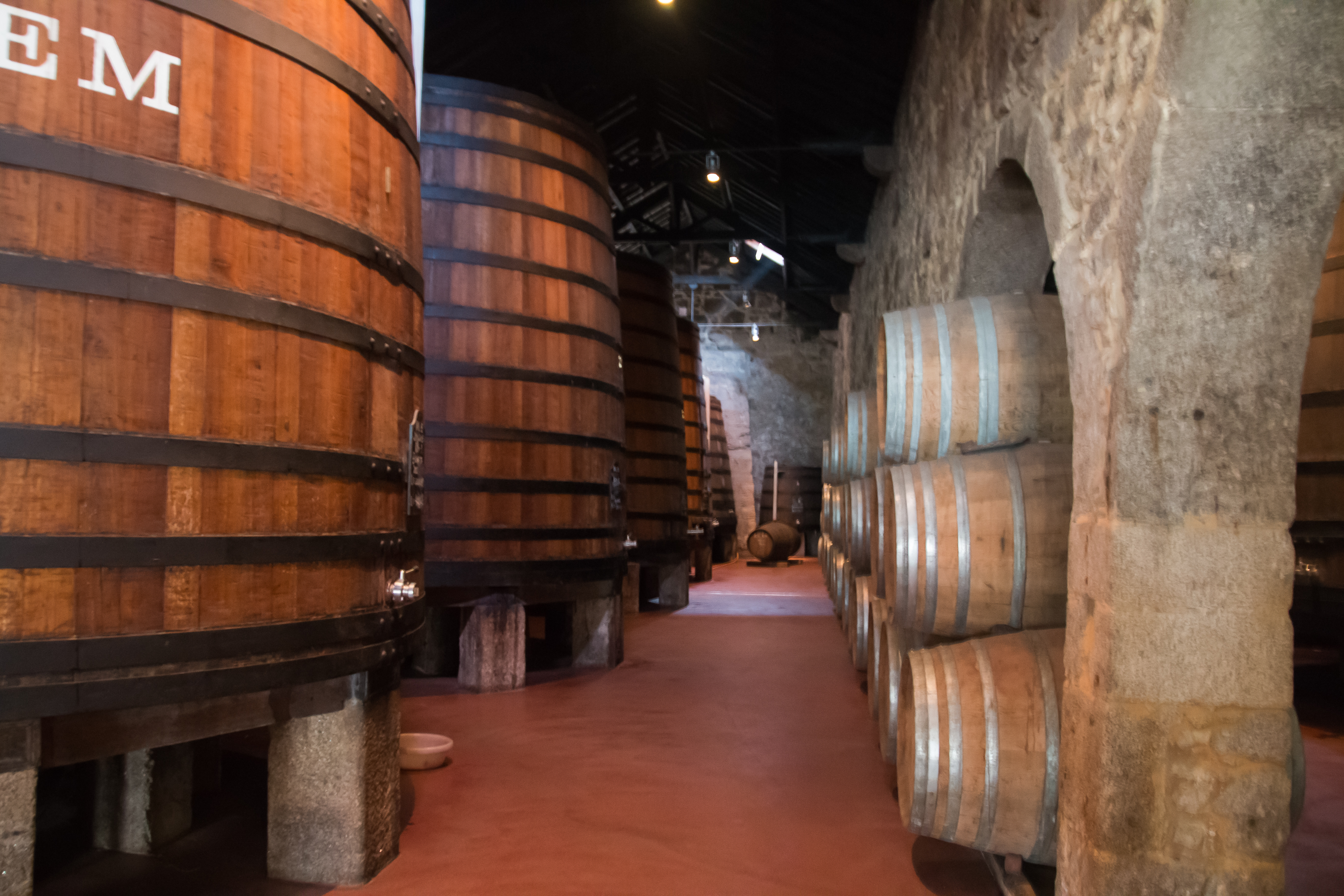
Calem port wine warehouses

Vila Nova de Gaia served as a hub for sailors and merchants involved in Atlantic trade routes and connections with Brazil and North America. Some historians argue that famed explorer Ferdinand Magellan may have been born in Gaia, alongside navigator Nuno da Silva, who played a role in Francis Drake's circumnavigation of the globe. Several exporting companies had warehouses in Gaia and from 1777, Vila Nova de Gaia became the official storage site for all wine and port wine exporters, following the reforms of the Douro Wine Company.

=== 19th century reforms and industrialization ===
In the early 19th century, Vila Nova de Gaia experienced significant upheaval during the French Invasions, particularly the second invasion, which caused widespread damage and hardship. Following the expulsion of the French, British forces exerted influence over Portugal, dominating commerce and connections with the royal court in Brazil. This period of foreign dominance set the stage for the Liberal Revolution of 1820, organized in part within Gaia's wine cellars and erupting in neighboring Porto. In 1832, during the Siege of Porto, the Serra do Pilar Monastery in Gaia played a crucial role in defending the city against Miguelist troops. The monastery's strategic importance persisted, leading to its transformation into a military barracks, a role it continues to fulfill today. In 1836, the Vila Nova de Gaia municipality contained 9,541 households, 1490 of which were in the Vila Nova de Gaia parish.

This period would also lead to significant territorial reforms and the creation of the modern Vila Nova de Gaia municipality in 1832, merging the former Vila Nova de Rey and Gaia municipalities. Vila Nova de Gaia regained municipal autonomy in 1834, following the dissolution of the Porto Territory in 1821. Between 1832 and 1836, Avintes, Grijó, Crestuma and Sandim were raised to municipalities, following the Mouzinho da Silveira territorial reforms, but they were ultimately incorporated to the Gaia municipality. The later two had previously been under Santa Maria da Feira's jurisdiction. The municipality continued to experience reforms in the 20th and 21st centuries. In 1928, the parish of Guetim was transferred to the municipality of Espinho, while Lever was annexed to Vila Nova de Gaia. In 1952, Afurada and its surrounding area were separated from Santa Marinha to form a new parish. In 2013, an administrative reform would reorganize the 24 parish into 15 subdivisions, including the reuniting of the central parishes of Afurada and Santa Marinha.

The 19th century brought significant development, with the emergence of the ceramics, cooperage, textiles, metalworking, and vehicle construction industries and the continuation of traditional activities of shipbuilding and milling. Exports of agricultural goods to Brazil and the Northern Europe increased, such as wine, cork, olive oil, livestock and vegetables. Cultural associations emerged such as business, sports, and musical clubs, as well as local chapters of political parties, syndicates and cooperatives. Educational institutions were founded and museums were inaugurated such as the Azuaga Museum and Casa Museu Teixeira Lopes. Granja beach also became a popular destination, of easy access upon the arrival of the railways.

The transportation network improved significantly, assisting transport of raw goods and exports. The royal road between Coimbra and Vila Nova de Gaia was improved and the Dom Luís I Bridge opened in 1886. In 1864, the Linha do Norte railway reached Devesas and later Porto upon the construction of Maria Pia Bridge in 1877. At the end of the 19th century, the Leixões port was inaugurated.

In the 20th century, urban development transformed Vila Nova de Gaia. The construction of Avenida da República and the new city council (Câmara municipal) building in 1916 redefined the city's center. In 1984, Gaia was raised to city status.

== Geography ==
Vila Nova de Gaia is located on the southern bank at the mouth of the Douro River, directly across from the municipalities of Porto and Gondomar. In the west, the municipality extends towards the Atlantic Ocean, while in the east it includes the valleys of the Febros and Uíma rivers, tributaries of the Douro, by the modest elevations of Serra de Negrelos and Monte Murado. The area's physical geography has remained largely unchanged over time, aside from natural variations in sea and river levels. It is the largest municipality within the Porto Metropolitan Area.

=== Parishes ===
==== 2013 administrative reorganization ====
Following the 2013 administrative reorganization, the municipality was divided into 15 civil parishes (freguesias):

Parish	Population	Area (km^{2})
Arcozelo	15,144	8.50
Avintes	10,836	8.82
Canelas	13,918	6.90
Canidelo	28,054	8.93
Grijó e Sermonde	12,018	12.99
Gulpilhares e Valadares	22,322	10.61
Madalena	10,551	4.69
Mafamude e Vilar do Paraíso	52,844	10.58
Oliveira do Douro	22,615	7.54
Pedroso e Seixezelo	20,226	20.88
Sandim, Olival, Lever e Crestuma	15,956	34.16
Santa Marinha e São Pedro da Afurada	34,032	6.91
São Félix da Marinha	13,560	7.93
Serzedo e Perosinho	13,745	11.97
Vilar de Andorinho	18,003	7.07

The former parish Santa Marinha e São Pedro da Afurada contained the city centre of Vila Nova de Gaia.

As of 2024, the municipality announced it was working to reverse the union of the former parishes of Sandim, Olival, Lever and Crestuma, which had been unified in the 2013 administrative reform. The municipality defended that the disaggregation was fundamental for territorial cohesion, since the current parish encompassed a large territory. This is estimated to cost the municipality €370,000.

==== Restoration of parishes in 2025 ====
Law No. 25-A/2025 of 13 March provided for the dissolution of the municipality's seven unions of parishes and the restoration of their 16 constituent parishes. Under Article 14, the restoration took effect when the newly elected bodies took office following the 2025 Portuguese local elections. The municipality thus returned to a total of 24 civil parishes.

The presidents of the parish councils (juntas de freguesia) and parish assemblies (assembleias de freguesia) for the 2025–2029 term are listed below, based on the official register of local elected representatives and information published by the parish bodies.

Presidents of parish bodies — 2025–2029 term
Parish	President of the parish council	President of the parish assembly	Political party or coalition	Website
Arcozelo	Vasco António de Castro Bezerra	Cristina Maria Ferreira Duarte Brito Lopes	PPD/PSD–CDS-PP–IL	www.jf-arcozelo.pt
Avintes	Nicolino Eduardo da Silva Ribeiro	Domingos Martins de Oliveira	PS	jfavintes.pt
Canelas	Ana Luísa de Oliveira Ferreira	Carla Alexandra de Castro Moita Dias	Council: PS; Assembly: PSD	www.jfcanelas.pt
Canidelo	Manuel António Coutinho Ferreirinha	Dália Miranda Lopes Eira	PS	jfcanidelo.pt
Crestuma	Pedro Miguel Barbosa Moreira	João Carlos da Cunha Silva	PS	jf-crestuma.pt
Grijó	Jorge Filipe Gomes Castro	Andreia Maria de Oliveira Afonso Volta e Sousa Ramos	PPD/PSD–CDS-PP–IL	viladegrijo.pt
Gulpilhares	Alfredo José Ribeiro da Rocha	Salvador Rodrigues Moreira Soares	PPD/PSD–CDS-PP–IL	jf-gulpilhares.pt
Lever	Manuel José Dias Oliveira Gama	José Alves da Cunha	PPD/PSD–CDS-PP–IL	jf-lever.pt
Madalena	Ricardo Miguel da Costa Almeida	Jaime Filipe Moreira de Castro	PS	www.jf-madalena.pt
Mafamude	Gustavo Leite Gama	Paulo Sérgio Costa da Silva	PPD/PSD–CDS-PP–IL	jfmafamude.pt
Olival	António Arlindo Monteiro Pinto	João Evangelista Nunes Teixeira	PPD/PSD–CDS-PP–IL	www.jfolival.pt
Oliveira do Douro	Fábio Emanuel Sá Rocha Oliveira Pinto	Rui Jorge de Almeida Cardoso	PPD/PSD–CDS-PP–IL	www.jfodouro.pt
Pedroso	Joaquim António Dias Tavares	Manuel Maria Paiva Moreira	PS	www.jfpedroso.pt
Perosinho	Manuel Jorge Moreira da Silva	Pedro Miguel Guedes Duarte Fontes	PPD/PSD–CDS-PP–IL	www.jf-perosinho.pt
Sandim	Fernando Constantino Augusto Ramos	António Joaquim Lopes Quelhas	PPD/PSD–CDS-PP–IL	jf-sandim.pt
Santa Marinha	Fernando Ferreira da Silva Duarte	Octávio José Martins Pimentel	PPD/PSD–CDS-PP–IL	santamarinha-gaia.pt
São Félix da Marinha	Luís António Neto Castro de Oliveira	Iliana de Sousa Rodrigues Ramos	PPD/PSD–CDS-PP–IL	www.jf-sfelixmarinha.pt
São Pedro da Afurada	Eduardo José Moreira de Matos	João Paulo da Silva Neto	PPD/PSD–CDS-PP–IL	jf-afurada.pt
Seixezelo	Sérgio Francisco dos Santos Batista	Maria Alice Coimbra de Sousa Lamas Alves	PPD/PSD–CDS-PP–IL	jf-seixezelo.pt
Sermonde	Manuel Joaquim de Sousa Félix	Ana Sofia de Sousa Félix	PPD/PSD–CDS-PP–IL	jf-sermonde.pt
Serzedo	Cláudio Alexandre Pereira Peixoto de Melo	Patrícia Soares dos Santos	Council: PS; Assembly: PPD/PSD–CDS-PP–IL	jf-serzedo.pt
Valadares	José António Soares Ribeiro	Pedro Emanuel Silva Pinto de Sá	PPD/PSD–CDS-PP–IL	jf-valadares.pt
Vilar de Andorinho	Andreia Maria Ferreira Teixeira	Álvaro António Pires de Moura Bastos	Council: PS; Assembly: PPD/PSD–CDS-PP–IL	www.jf-vilardeandorinho.pt
Vilar do Paraíso	Sara Raquel Rodrigues Magalhães	Gil Clemente Teixeira	PS	jfvilardoparaiso.pt

== Demographics ==
Historical population

Year	Pop.	±%
1864	47,631	—
1878	54,456	+14.3%
1890	65,713	+20.7%
1900	74,482	+13.3%
1911	84,994	+14.1%
1920	85,900	+1.1%
1930	102,950	+19.8%
1940	119,697	+16.3%

Year	Pop.	±%
1950	133,760	+11.7%
1960	157,357	+17.6%
1970	180,875	+14.9%
1981	226,331	+25.1%
1991	248,565	+9.8%
2001	288,749	+16.2%
2011	302,295	+4.7%
2021	303,824	+0.5%

Source: INE

== Leisure and tourism ==
=== Beaches ===
Vila Nova de Gaia is the Portuguese municipality with the highest number of Blue Flag beaches in 2009 and in 2010: 17 beaches along 17 km of seaside. Some popular beaches are: Miramar, Granja, Aguda, Valadares, Francelos, Madalena and Canidelo. Praia da Granja is a FEE Blue Flag beach in the parish of São Félix da Marinha. This area was a farm in the 18th century belong to the Grijó Monastery and used as a rest place of monks and priests.

=== Parks and gardens ===
- Gaia Biological Park (Portuguese: Parque Biológico de Gaia) is the largest park in the city, with an area of 35 hectares. The Park established in 1983 as an environmental education center, features a 3 km walkway along with hundreds of species of animals and plants.
- Opened in August 2005, the Lavandeira Park (Portuguese: Parque da Lavandeira) is a place for leisure activities with a lake, pedestrian walks, picnic areas and theme gardens. It has an area of 11 hectares located in Oliveira do Douro.
- Jardim do Morro ("Garden of the Hill") is a garden located in the parish of Santa Marinha, near the Sera do Pilar Monastery. It was established in 1927. There is a lake, a number of plant species including Tilias.
- The Littoral Station of Aguda (Portuguese: Estação Litoral da Aguda) is a show aquarium opened in 1999 on the beach of Aguda (Portuguese: Praia da Aguda) in Arcozelo. The building designed by the architect João Paulo Peixoto includes 3 main sections: Fisheries Museum displaying fishery equipment; Aquarius demonstrating local aquatic fauna and flora, and the Department of Environmental Education and Scientific Research on marine ecology, fishery and aquaculture.
- Local Nature Reserve of the Douro Estuary (Portuguese: Reserva Natural Local do Estuário do Douro) is a small nature reserve established in 2007 with the aim of the protection of birds and landscape. There can be seen cormorants, herons, white egrets, tortoises, sea turtles, plovers, red knots, various species of seagulls, kingfishers among many other birds throughout a year. São Paio Bay is a popular spot for bird watchers.

There are also Dunes Park (Portuguese: Parque de Dunas), Botanical Park of Castelo (Portuguese: Parque Botânico do Castelo), Camelias Garden (Portuguese: Jardim das Camélias), Streams of Gaia (Portuguese: Ribeiras de Gaia), Maria Pia Bridge Park (Portuguese: Parque Ponte Maria Pia) in Vila Nova de Gaia.

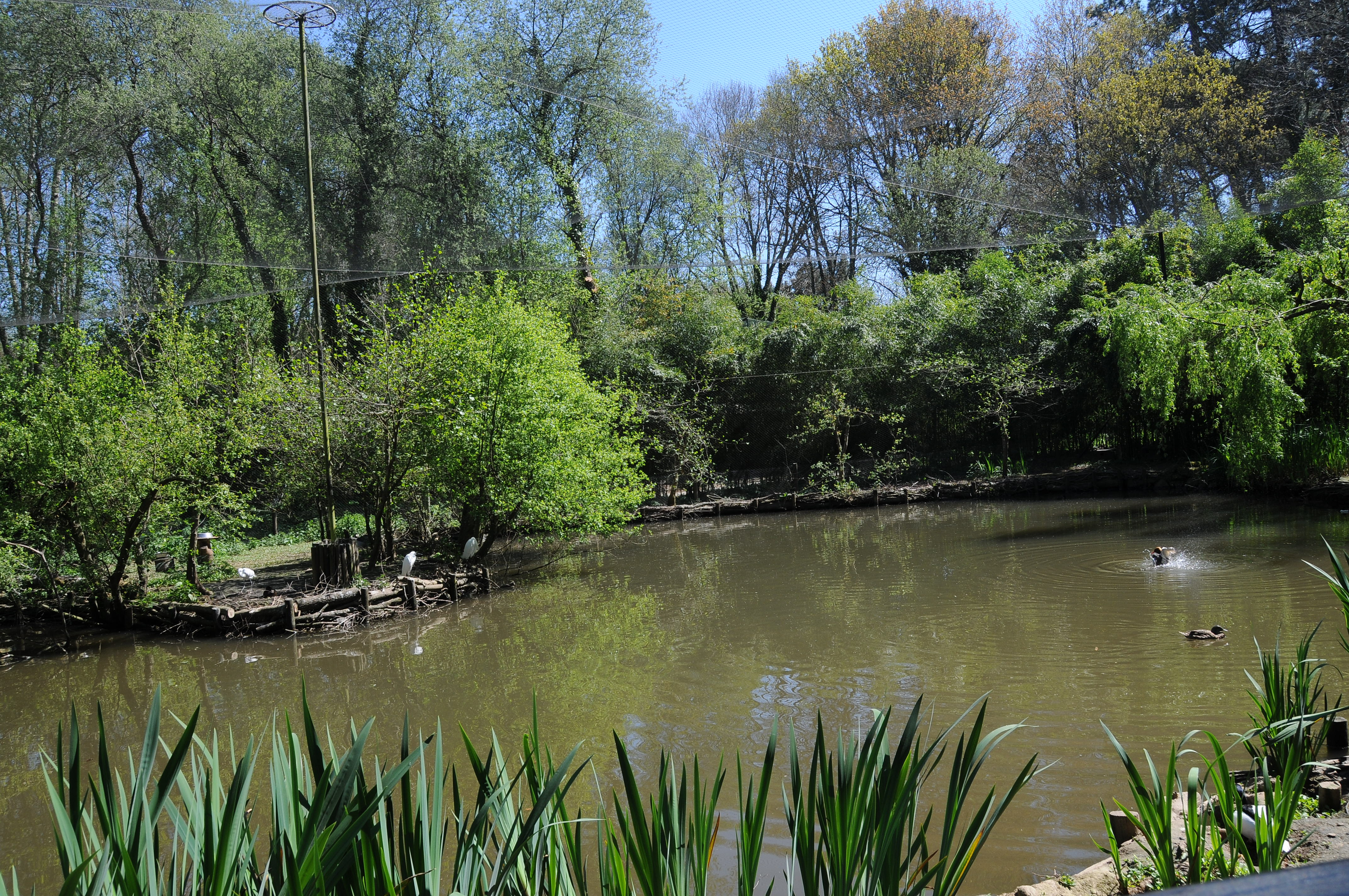
Gaia Biological Park

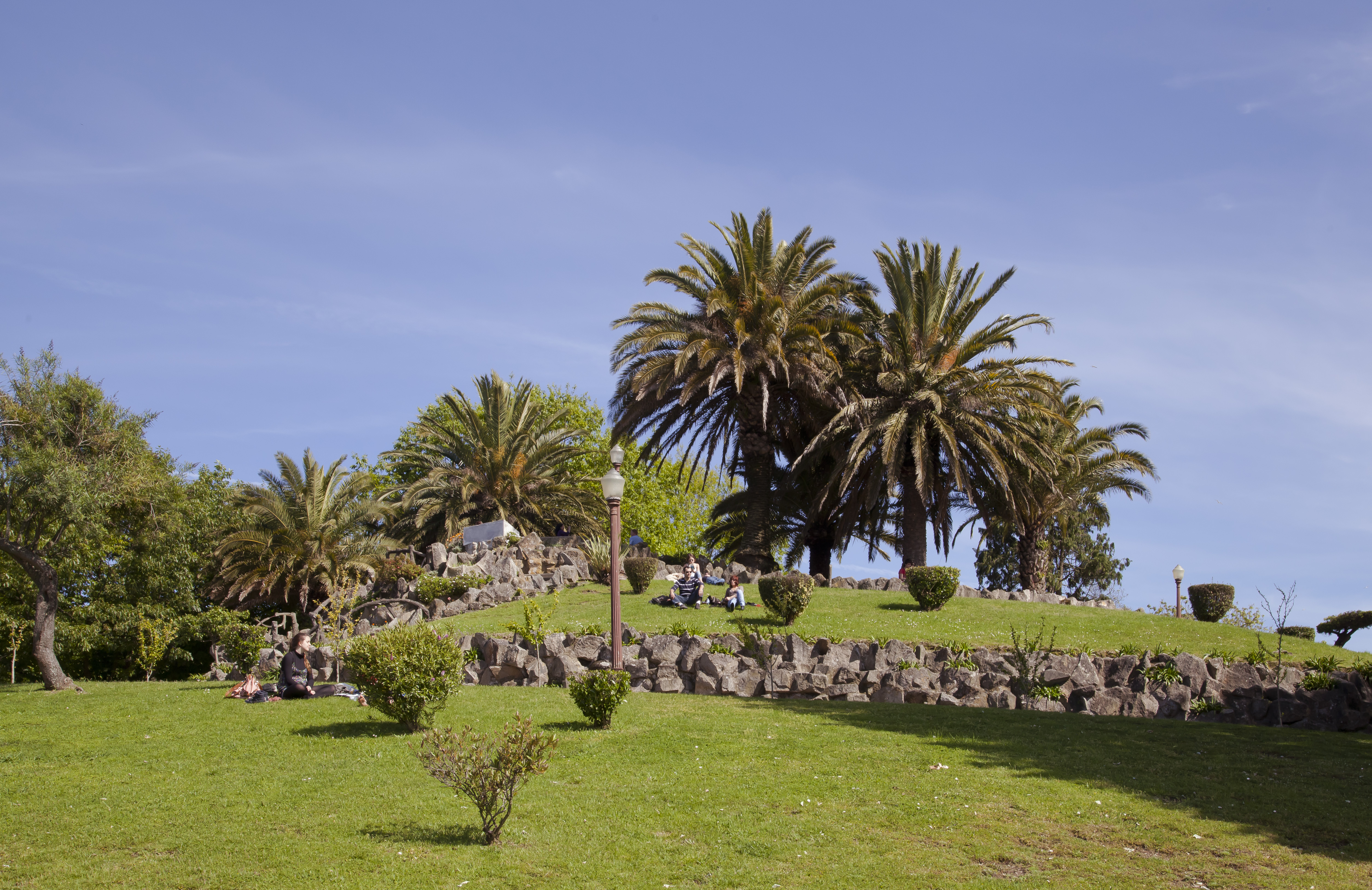
Jardim do Morro

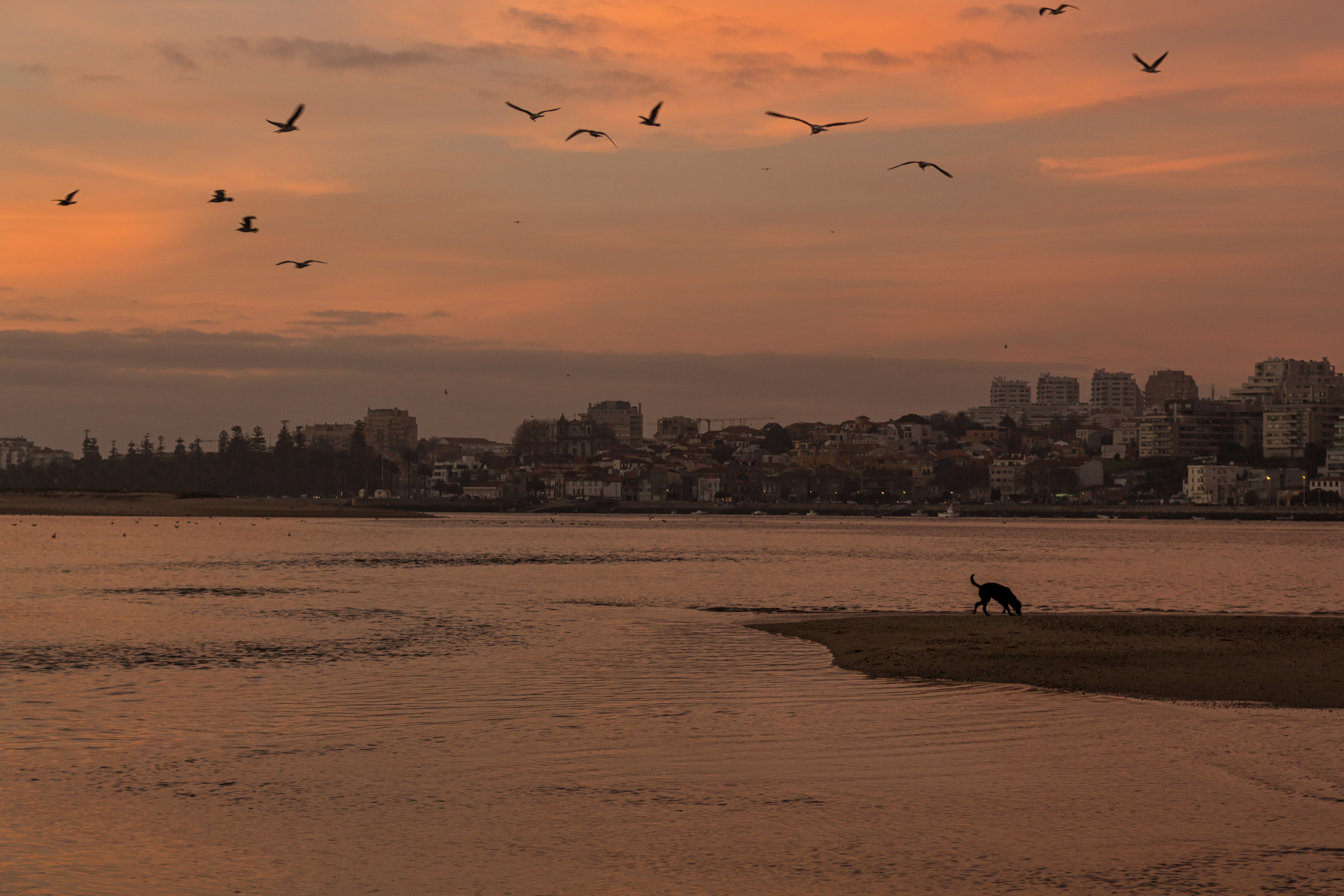
Nature Reserve of the Douro Estuary

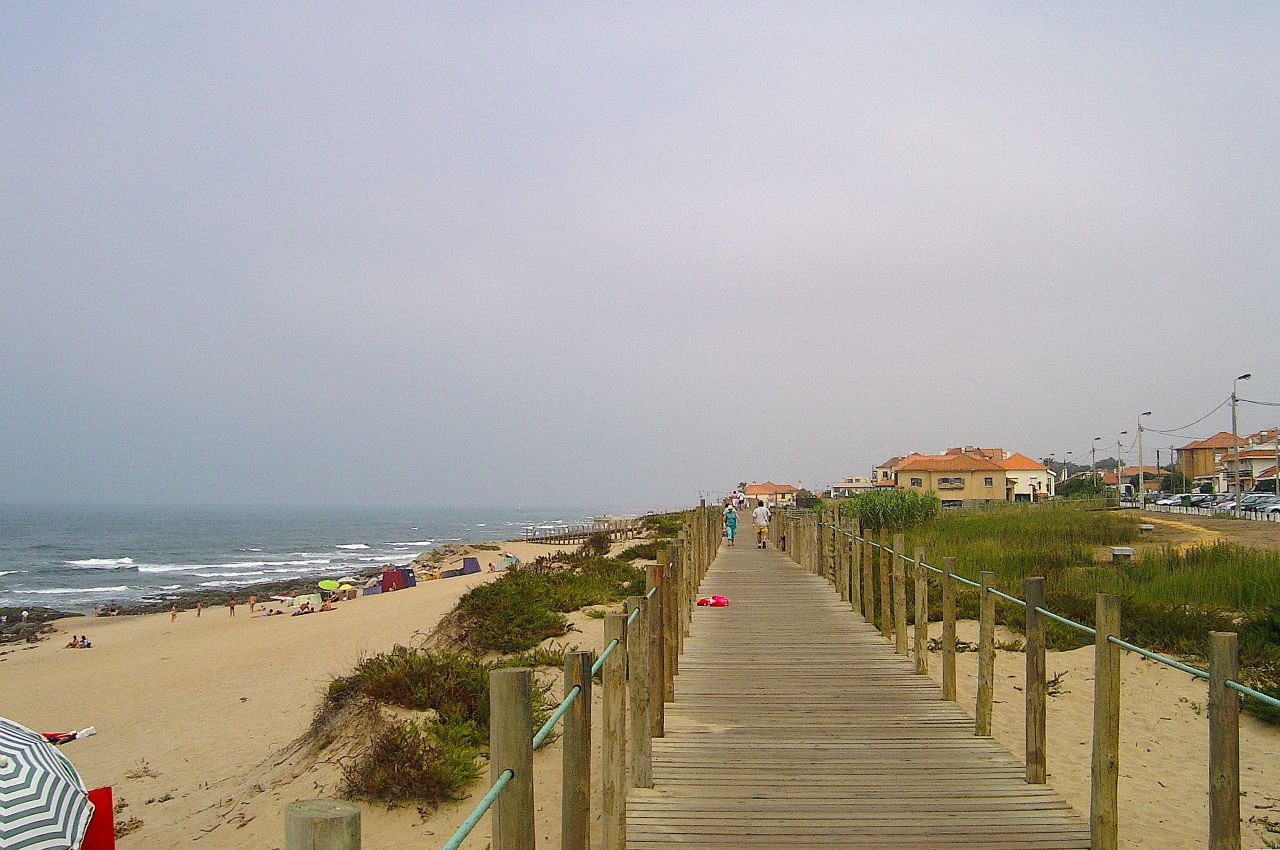
Granja beach

=== Museums ===
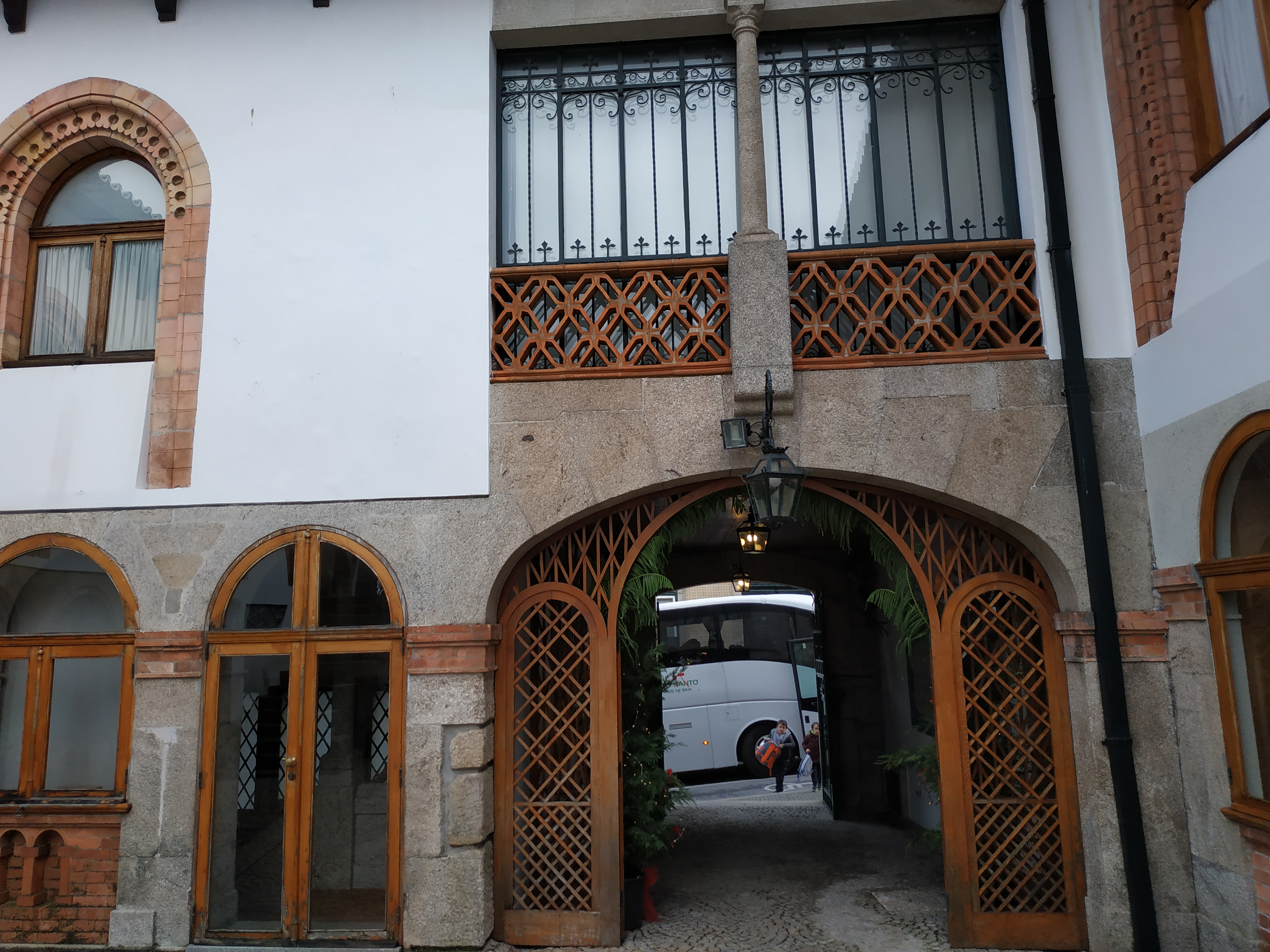
House-Museum of Teixeira Lopes

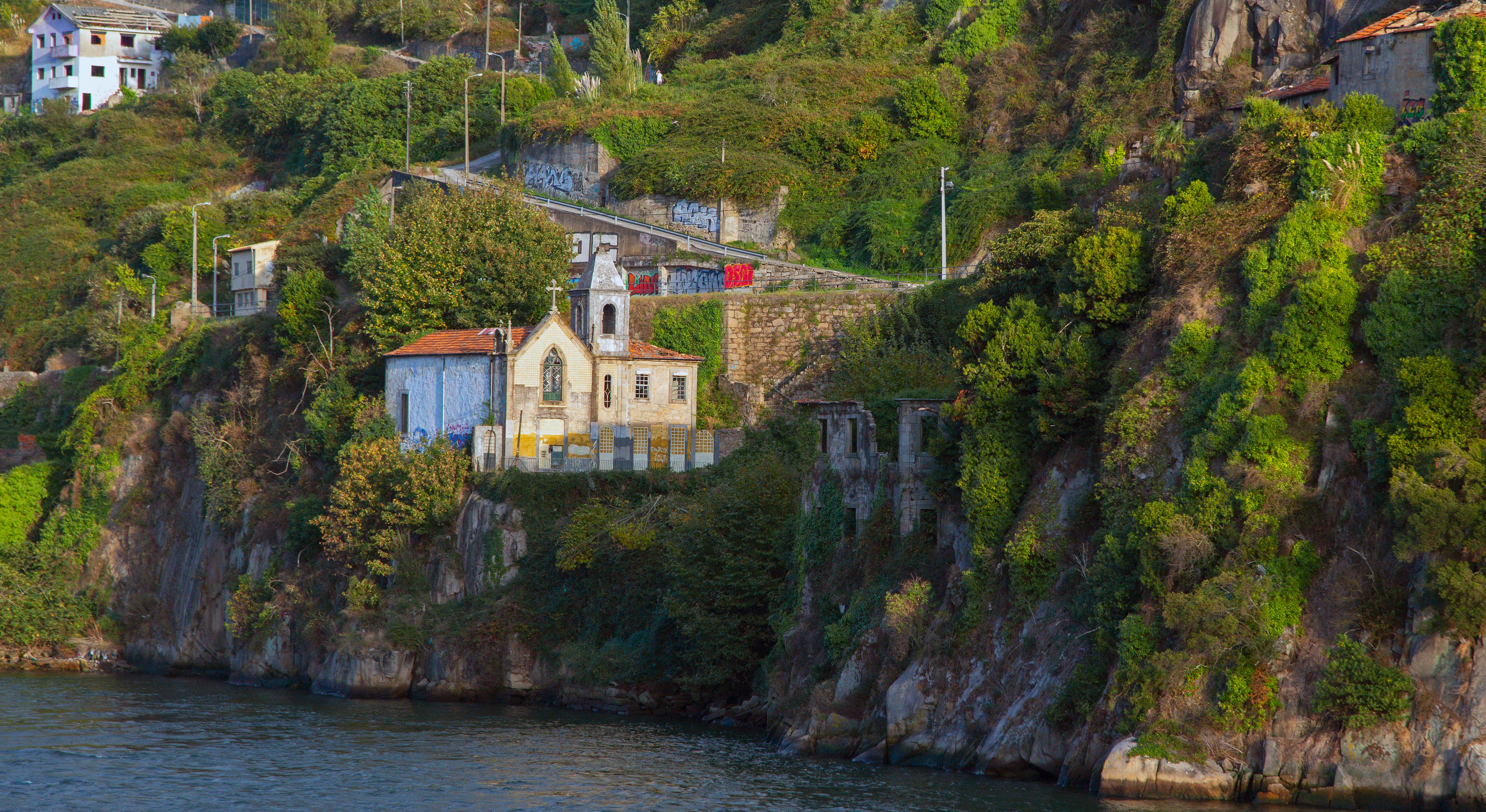
The historic section on the river

House-Museum Teixeira Lopes| Diogo de Macedo Gallery (Portuguese: Casa-Museu Teixeira Lopes| Galerias Diogo de Macedo) is a cultural center consisting of the house of the sculptor António Teixeira Lopes and recently built Diogo de Macedo Galleries located in Vila Nova de Gaia. The building of the museum was constructed in 1895 by António Teixeira Lopes and his brother José Teixeira Lopes as a residence and an atelier. The Master donated this property to the municipality of Vila Nova de Gaia, and it was opened to the public as a house-museum in 1933. Diogo de Macedo Gallery was established in 1975 in a building annexed to Teixeira Lopes' atelier. The Art Galleries in the House-museum demonstrates works of Portuguese painters and sculptors, as well as pieces of pottery factories of Gaia, while Diogo de Macedo Galleries display the sculptural works of Diogo de Macedo and his art collection consisting of decorative art examples from 16th-20th centuries.

Solar dos Condes de Resende is a former manorial property which is now the headquarter of the Municipal House of Culture located in the village of Negrelos. Its construction dates back to the Medieval Ages. In the 16th century, the property belonged to Tomé da Costa, a nobleman from Vila Nova de Gaia who served for the Kingdom during the period of the Philippine dynasty. The building was also known as Quinta da Costa. The building has a semi-public chapel dedicated to São Tomé, a Baroque garden with camellias and a large tank of stonework that receives water from the source of São Mamede in Serra de Canelas. There is also a statue dedicated to the writer Eça de Queiroz who fell in love with the daughter of the owner (4th Count of Resende) and married her (Emília de Castro Pamplona). After the City Council of Gaia purchased the property in 1984, it has been operating as Municipal House of Culture. There is a Documentation Center for History, Archaeology, Art and Anthropology, as well as a museum site with Azuaga Marciano Collection.

== Transport ==
Vila Nova de Gaia is traversed from north to south by the Linha do Norte railway, along which there a number of stations including the main Gaia station.

Local public transport is operated by the Metro do Porto, who serve Gaia with a single line (D) that crosses the upper deck of the Dom Luís I Bridge, and the Sociedade de Transportes Colectivos do Porto and UNIR, which provides bus service. Suburban train services are provided by the CP Urbanos do Porto.

The tourist oriented Teleférico de Gaia connects the bank of Douro river with the upper deck of the Dom Luís I Bridge. The upper station is located next to Jardim do Morro station of the Porto Metro and the Serra do Pilar Monastery. The lower station is on the riverside promenade of Cais de Gaia.

== Coat of arms and flag ==
The current coat of arms was proposed by the Portuguese Institute of Heraldry and officially adopted in June 28, 1934. The shield consists of a silver crest featuring a black tower, which represents "regional effort". Emerging from the top of the tower is a man dressed in red, blowing a golden horn. This sentinel, representing "heroic significance" and "fidelity". Flaking the tower are two old Portuguese escutcheons, and two bunches of golden grapes with green leaves. Representing the region's "local wealth", the grapes highlight the city's historic connection to the wine industry. At the bottom of the shield, two wavy blue bands represent the Douro River.

The coat of arms is topped with a silver mural crown. Following Vila Nova de Gaia's elevation to city status in 1984, the crown was updated to feature five towers.

The municipal flag features the coat of arms centered on a gyronny field (divided into eight wedges) alternating gold and black, beginning with the north-northeast octant.

== Sister cities ==
Vila Nova de Gaia is twinned with:

- Concord, Massachusetts, United States of America
- Dunavarsány, Hungary

== Notable people ==
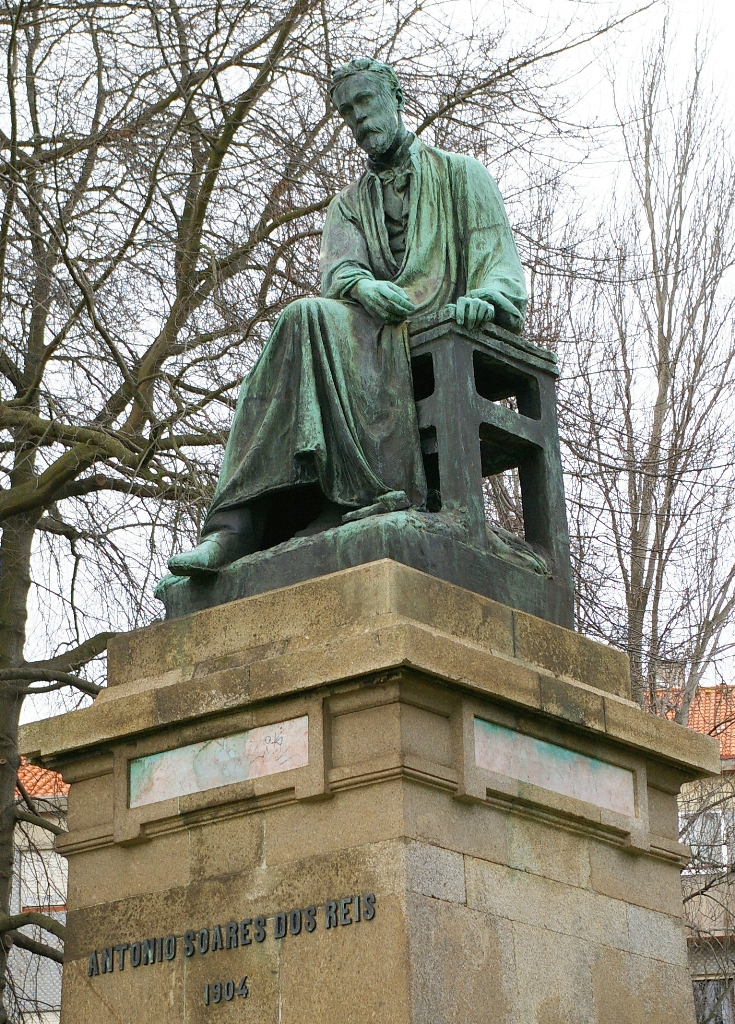
Soares dos Reis

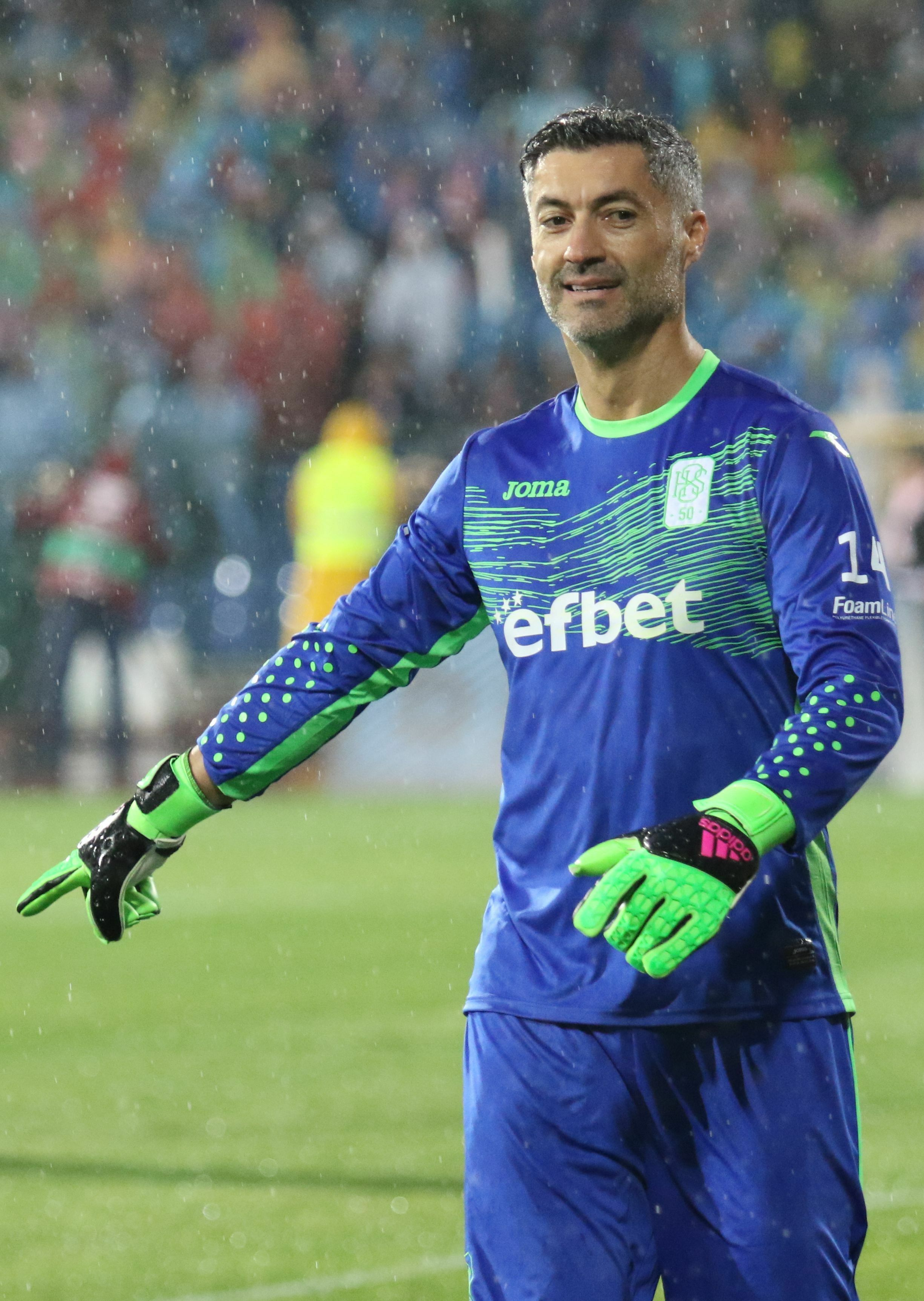
Vitor Baía

- Maria Isabel Wittenhall van Zeller (1749–1819), a pioneer in the use of vaccination against smallpox
- Antónia de Sousa (1940–2025), a Portuguese journalist and feminist
- António Soares dos Reis (1847–1889), a Portuguese sculptor
- António Teixeira Lopes (1866–1942), a Portuguese sculptor
- Daniel Pina Cabral (1924–2008), an Anglican bishop, Bishop of Lebombo, Mozambique, 1968 to 1976
- António Pires Veloso (1926–2014), an Army General, overseas Governor & political candidate
- António Reis (1927–1991), a film director, screenwriter and producer, poet, sculptor and ethnographer
- Maria Alberta Menéres (1930–2019), a Portuguese author, children's writer, journalist and poet
- Bruce Duncan Guimaraens (1935–2002), a Portuguese-British port wine maker
- António Pinho Vargas (born 1951), a jazz and contemporary music composer and pianist
- Paulo Rangel (born 1968), a Portuguese jurist, politician and MEP since 2009
- Dalila Carmo (born 1974), a Portuguese actress
- Sónia Rocha (born c. 1975), a cell biologist and academic at University of Liverpool

=== Sports ===
- João Pinto (born 1961), a retired footballer with 408 club caps and 70 for Portugal
- José Tavares (born 1966), a retired footballer with 294 club caps and 8 for Portugal
- Vítor Baía (born 1969), a retired football goalkeeper with 447 club caps and 80 for Portugal
- Basílio Almeida (born 1971), a footballer with 499 club caps
- António Folha (born 1971), a footballer with 337 club caps and 26 for Portugal and current manager
- Rui Jorge (born 1973), a retired footballer with 324 club caps and 45 for Portugal
- Fernando Jorge Tavares de Oliveira (born 1975), known as Bock, a retired footballer with 635 club caps
- Artur Soares Dias (born 1979), a football referee with FIFA & UEFA since 2010
- Ricardo Costa (born 1981), a footballer with 458 club caps and 22 for Portugal
- Lenine Cunha (born 1982) a Paralympic athlete, competed in the 2000 Summer Paralympics
- Luís Monteiro (born 1983), a former free-style swimmer, competed at the 2004 Summer Olympics
- Bruno Vale (born 1983), a retired football goalkeeper with 476 club caps and one for Portugal
- Vanessa Fernandes (born 1985), a triathlete and silver medallist at the 2008 Summer Olympics
- André Gomes (born 1993), with over 200 club caps and 29 for Portugal
- Ivo Oliveira & Rui Oliveira (twins, born 1996), Portuguese racing cyclists
- Martim (born 2002) and Francisco Costa (born 2005), handballers for Sporting CP and the Portuguese national team.
