= Praia da Granja =

Beach in Vila Nova de Gaia, Portugal

- Beach
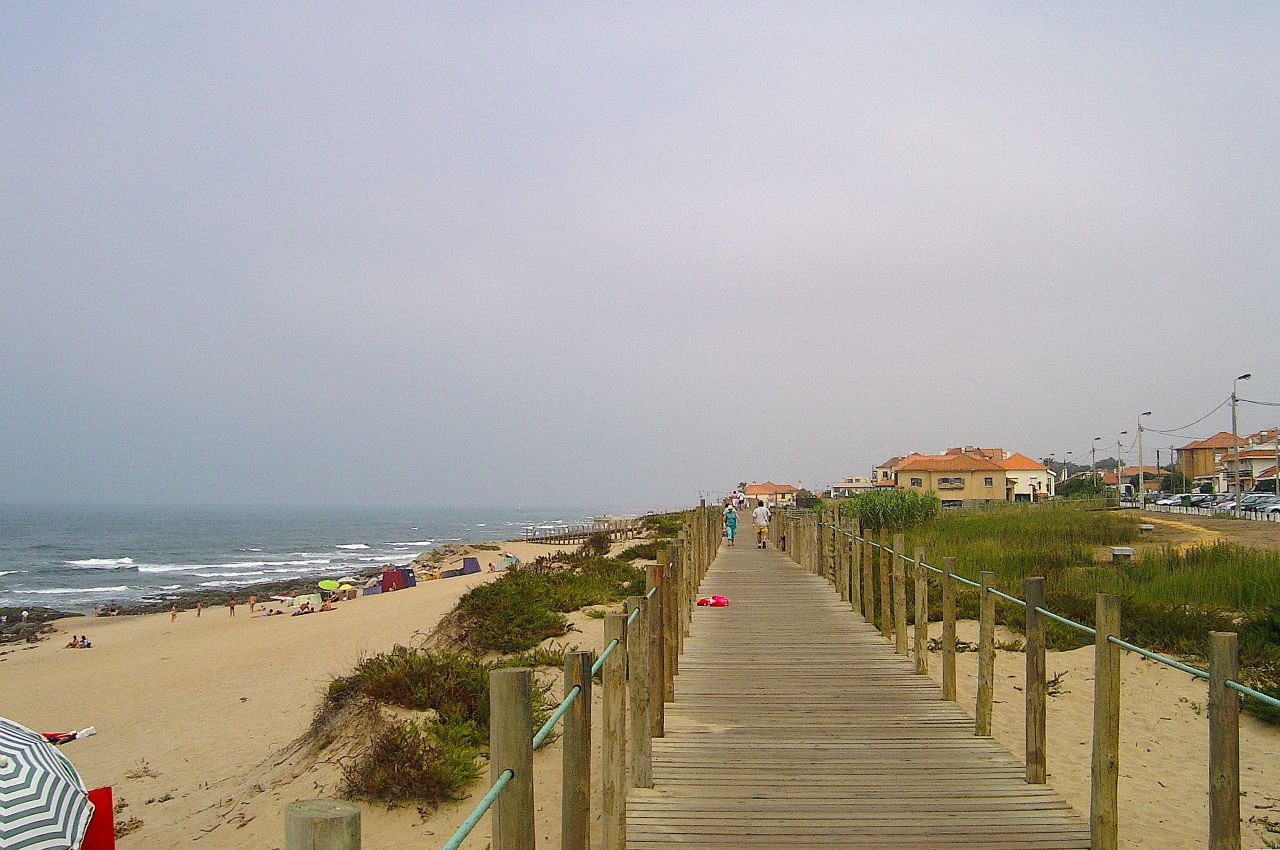
- Praia da Granja

- Location within Portugal
- Coordinates: 41°02′10.6″N 8°38′54.0″W
- Location: Vila Nova de Gaia, Norte, Portugal

Praia da Granja is a FEE Blue Flag beach located in the Northwest of Portugal, and belongs to the Vila Nova de Gaia municipality, Porto District. This place is also located in the town of São Félix da Marinha. The northern boundary of the beach is bordered by the Ribeira da Granja.

== Name origin ==
The word Granja means Farm. The geographical location of Granja came from a Bishop Farm situated there in 1758. It belonged at that time to the "Crúzios" Monks and Priests. They used it on hot days as a place to rest and introspect. Portuguese poet Sophia de Mello Breyner Andresen, who was from Porto, spent the summertime there with her family in their beach house mansion by the sea. The city of Espinho can be found to the south, while the cities of Porto and Gaia can be found to the north.

== Facilities ==
During the summer months Praia da Granja is patrolled by lifeguards. There are several licensed bar, restaurant concessions along the beach. there are toilet and shower facilities and there are opportunities to hire parasols and sun loungers.

== See also ==
- Grande Porto
- Beaches in Portugal
