= Olival, Vila Nova de Gaia =

Coordinates: 41.071°N 8.527°W

Location of Olival in Vila Nova de Gaia.

Olival is a former civil parish in the municipality of Vila Nova de Gaia, Portugal. In 2013, the parish merged into the new parish Sandim, Olival, Lever e Crestuma. The population in 2011 was 5,812, in an area of 8.07 km².
