= Canidelo, Vila Nova de Gaia =

Canidelo
- Civil parish
- Location in Portugal
- Coordinates: 41.135°N 8.651°W
- Country: Portugal
- Region: Norte
- Metropolitan area: Porto
- District: Porto
- Municipality: Vila Nova de Gaia

Area
  - Total: 8.93 km^{2} (3.45 sq mi)

Population (2011)
  - Total: 27,769
  - Density: 3,100/km^{2} (8,100/sq mi)
- Time zone: UTC+00:00 (WET)
  - Summer (DST): UTC+01:00 (WEST)

Canidelo is a Portuguese parish in the municipality of Vila Nova de Gaia. The population in 2011 was 27,769, in an area of 8.93 km^{2}. It is located along the mouth of Douro river and the Atlantic Ocean, across from Foz do Douro, Porto.
