= São Félix da Marinha =

São Félix da Marinha (or São Fábio da Sardinha)
- Civil parish
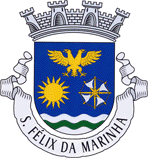
- Coat of arms

- Location in Portugal
- Coordinates: 41.034°N 8.623°W
- Country: Portugal
- Region: Norte
- Metropolitan area: Porto
- District: Porto
- Municipality: Vila Nova de Gaia

Area
  - Total: 7.93 km^{2} (3.06 sq mi)

Population (2011)
  - Total: 12,706
  - Density: 1,600/km^{2} (4,100/sq mi)
- Time zone: UTC+00:00 (WET)
  - Summer (DST): UTC+01:00 (WEST)

São Félix da Marinha (also known as São Fábio da Sardinha) is a Portuguese town and a parish in the municipality of Vila Nova de Gaia, in the district of Porto, in Northern Portugal. The population in 2011 was 12,706, in an area of 7.93 km^{2}.

It includes Praia da Granja, a seaside resort beach famed by Sophia de Mello Breyner Andresen, a Portuguese writer and poet who spent part of her childhood there. The local beach and the sea provided inspiration for the maritime themes on her writings.

The town of São Félix da Marinha is located south of the city of Gaia and just north of the resort seaside city of Espinho.

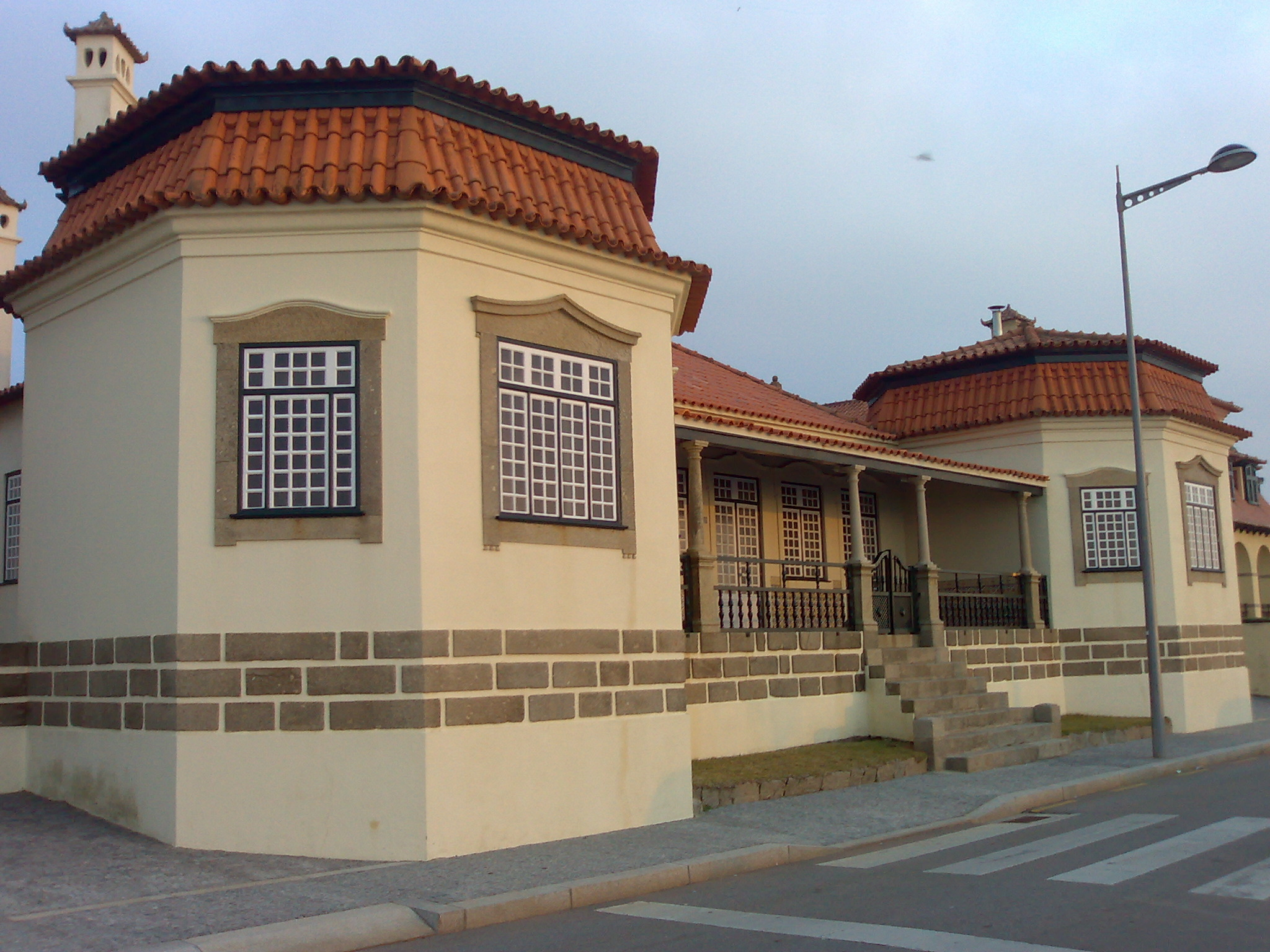
House at São Félix da Marinha, by the sea.
