= Serzedo, Vila Nova de Gaia =

Coordinates: 41.051°N 8.629°W

Location of Serzedo in Vila Nova de Gaia.

Serzedo is a former civil parish in the municipality of Vila Nova de Gaia, Portugal. In 2013, the parish merged into the new parish Serzedo e Perosinho. The population in 2011 was 7,891, in an area of 6.68 km². The distance to Center of Vila Nova de Gaia (Main City) is 10 km.
