= Oliveira do Douro, Vila Nova de Gaia =

Oliveira do Douro
- Civil parish
- Location in Portugal
- Coordinates: 41.133°N 8.588°W
- Country: Portugal
- Region: Norte
- Metropolitan area: Porto
- District: Porto
- Municipality: Vila Nova de Gaia

Area
  - Total: 7.54 km^{2} (2.91 sq mi)

Population (2011)
  - Total: 22,383
  - Density: 3,000/km^{2} (7,700/sq mi)
- Time zone: UTC+00:00 (WET)
  - Summer (DST): UTC+01:00 (WEST)

Oliveira do Douro is a Portuguese parish in the municipality of Vila Nova de Gaia. The population in 2011 was 22,383, in an area of 7.54 km².
