= List of freguesias of Portugal: V =

The freguesias (civil parishes) of Portugal are listed in by municipality according to the following format:

- concelho
  - freguesias

== Vagos ==
- Calvão
- Covão do Lobo
- Fonte de Angeão
- Gafanha da Boa Hora
- Ouca
- Ponte de Vagos
- Santa Catarina
- Santo André de Vagos
- Santo António de Vagos
- Sosa
- Vagos

== Vale de Cambra ==
- Arões
- Cepelos
- Codal
- Junqueira
- Macieira de Cambra
- Roge
- São Pedro de Castelões
- Vila Chã
- Vila Cova de Perrinho

== Valença ==
- Arão
- Boivão
- Cerdal
- Cristelo Covo
- Fontoura
- Friestas
- Gandra
- Ganfei
- Gondomil
- Sanfins
- São Julião
- São Pedro da Torre
- Silva
- Taião
- Valença
- Verdoejo

== Valongo ==
- Alfena
- Campo
- Ermesinde
- Sobrado
- Valongo

== Valpaços ==
- Água Revés e Crasto
- Algeriz
- Alvarelhos
- Barreiros
- Bouçoães
- Canaveses
- Carrezedo de Montenegro
- Curros
- Ervões
- Fiães
- Fornos do Pinhal
- Friões
- Lebução
- Nozelos
- Padrela e Tazem
- Possacos
- Rio Torto
- Sanfins
- Santa Maria de Emeres
- Santa Valha
- Santiago da Ribeira de Alhariz
- São João da Corveira
- São Pedro de Veiga de Lila
- Serapicos
- Sonim
- Tinhela
- Vales
- Valpaços
- Vassal
- Veiga de Lila
- Vilarandelo

== Velas (Azores) ==
- Manadas
- Norte Grande
- Rosais
- Santo Amaro
- Urzelina
- Velas

== Vendas Novas ==
- Landeira
- Vendas Novas

== Viana do Alentejo ==
- Aguiar
- Alcáçovas
- Viana do Alentejo

== Viana do Castelo ==
- Afife
- Alvarães
- Amonde
- Anha
- Areosa
- Barroselas
- Cardielos
- Carreço
- Carvoeiro
- Castelo do Neiva
- Chafé
- Darque
- Deão
- Deocriste
- Freixieiro de Soutelo
- Geraz do Lima (Santa Leocádia)
- Geraz do Lima (Santa Maria)
- Lanheses
- Mazarefes
- Meadela
- Meixedo
- Montaria
- Moreira de Geraz do Lima
- Mujães
- Neiva
- Nogueira
- Outeiro
- Perre
- Portela Susã
- Portuzelo
- Serreleis
- Subportela
- Torre
- Viana do Castelo (Monserrate)
- Viana do Castelo (Santa Maria Maior)
- Vila de Punhe
- Vila Franca
- Vila Fria
- Vila Mou
- Vilar de Murteda

== Vidigueira ==
- Pedrógão
- Selmes
- Vidigueira
- Vila de Frades

== Vieira do Minho ==
- Anissó
- Anjos
- Campos
- Caniçada
- Cantelães
- Cova
- Eira Vedra
- Guilhofrei
- Louredo
- Mosteiro
- Parada do Bouro
- Pinheiro
- Rossas
- Ruivães
- Salamonde
- Soengas
- Soutelo
- Tabuaças
- Ventosa
- Vieira do Minho
- Vilar do Chão

== Vila da Praia da Vitoria ==
- Agualva
- Biscoitos
- Cabo da Praia
- Fonte do Bastardo
- Fontinhas
- Lajes
- Porto Martins
- Praia da Vitória (Santa Cruz)
- Quatro Ribeiras
- São Brás
- Vila Nova

== Vila de Rei ==
- Fundada
- São João do Peso
- Vila de Rei

== Vila do Bispo ==
- Barão de São Miguel
- Budens
- Raposeira
- Sagres
- Vila do Bispo

== Vila do Conde ==
- Arcos
- Árvore
- Aveleda
- Azurara
- Bagunte
- Canidelo
- Fajozes
- Ferreiró
- Fornelo
- Gião
- Guilhabreu
- Junqueira
- Labruge
- Macieira da Maia
- Malta
- Mindelo
- Modivas
- Mosteiró
- Outeiro Maior
- Parada
- Retorta
- Rio Mau
- Tougues
- Touguinha
- Touguinhó
- Vairão
- Vila Chã
- Vila do Conde
- Vilar
- Vilar de Pinheiro

== Vila do Porto (Azores) ==
- Almagreira
- Santa Bárbara
- Santo Espírito
- São Pedro
- Vila do Porto

== Vila Flor ==
- Assares
- Benlhevai
- Candoso
- Carvalho de Egas
- Freixiel
- Lodões
- Mourão
- Nabo
- Roios
- Samões
- Sampaio
- Santa Comba de Vilariça
- Seixo de Manhoses
- Trindade
- Val de Torno
- Vale Frechoso
- Vila Flor
- Vilarinho das Azenhas
- Vilas Boas

== Vila Franca de Xira ==
- Alhandra (Portugal)
- Alverca do Ribatejo
- Cachoeiras
- Calhandriz
- Castanheira do Ribatejo
- Forte da Casa
- Póvoa de Santa Iria
- São João dos Montes
- Sobralinho
- Vialonga
- Vila Franca de Xira

== Vila Franca do Campo (Azores) ==
- Água de Alto
- Ponta Garça
- Ribeira das Tainhas
- Ribeira Seca
- São Miguel
- São Pedro

== Vila Nova da Barquinha ==
- Atalaia
- Moita do Norte
- Praia do Ribatejo
- Tancos
- Vila Nova da Barquinha

== Vila Nova de Cerveira ==
- Campos
- Candemil
- Cornes
- Covas
- Gondar
- Gondarém
- Loivo
- Lovelhe
- Mentrestido
- Nogueira
- Reboreda
- Sapardos
- Sopo
- Vila Meã
- Vila Nova de Cerveira

== Vila Nova de Famalicão ==
- Abade de Vermoim
- Antas
- Arnoso (Santa Eulália)
- Arnoso (Santa Maria)
- Avidos
- Bairro
- Bente
- Brufe
- Cabeçudos
- Calendário
- Carreira
- Castelões
- Cavalões
- Cruz
- Delães
- Esmeriz
- Fradelos
- Gavião
- Gondifelos
- Jesufrei
- Joane
- Lagoa
- Landim
- Lemenhe
- Louro
- Lousado
- Mogege
- Mouquim
- Nine
- Novais
- Oliveira (Santa Maria)
- Oliveira (São Mateus)
- Outiz
- Pedome
- Portela
- Pousada de Saramagos
- Requião
- Riba de Ave
- Ribeirão
- Ruivães
- Seide (São Miguel)
- Seide (São Paio)
- Sezures
- Telhado
- Vale (São Cosme)
- Vale (São Martinho)
- Vermoim
- Vila Nova de Famalicão
- Vilarinho das Cambas

== Vila Nova de Foz Côa ==
- Almendra
- Castelo Melhor
- Cedovim
- Chãs
- Custóias
- Freixo de Numão
- Horta
- Mós
- Murça
- Muxagata
- Numão
- Santa Comba
- Santo Amaro
- Sebadelhe
- Seixas
- Touça
- Vila Nova de Foz Côa

== Vila Nova de Gaia ==
- Arcozelo
- Avintes
- Canelas
- Canidelo
- Crestuma
- Grijó
- Gulpilhares
- Lever
- Madalena
- Mafamude
- Olival
- Oliveira do Douro
- Pedroso
- Perozinho
- Sandim
- São Félix da Marinha
- São Pedro da Afurada
- Seixezelo
- Sermonde
- Serzedo
- Valadares
- Vila Nova de Gaia (Santa Marinha)
- Vilar de Andorinho
- Vilar do Paraíso

== Vila Nova de Paiva ==
- Alhais
- Fráguas
- Pendilhe
- Queiriga
- Touro
- Vila Cova à Coelheira
- Vila Nova de Paiva

== Vila Nova de Poiares ==
- Arrifana
- Lavegadas
- Poiares (Santo André)
- São Miguel de Poiares

== Vila Pouca de Aguiar ==
- Afonsim
- Alfarela de Jales
- Bornes de Aguiar
- Bragado
- Capeludos
- Gouvães da Serra
- Parada de Monteiros
- Pensalvos
- Sabroso de Aguiar
- Santa Marta da Montanha
- Soutelo de Aguiar
- Telões
- Tresminas
- Valoura
- Vila Pouca de Aguiar
- Vreia de Bornes
- Vreia de Jales

== Vila Real ==
- Abaças
- Adoufe
- Andrães
- Arroios
- Borbela
- Campeã
- Constantim
- Ermida
- Folhadela
- Guiães
- Justes
- Lamares
- Lamas de Olo
- Lordelo
- Mateus
- Mondrões
- Mouçós
- Nogueira
- Parada de Cunhos
- Pena
- Quintã
- São Tomé do Castelo
- Torgueda
- Vale de Nogueiras
- Vila Cova
- Vila Marim
- Vila Real (Nossa Senhora da Conceição)
- Vila Real (São Dinis)
- Vila Real (São Pedro)
- Vilarinho de Samardã

== Vila Real de Santo António ==
- Monte Gordo
- Vila Nova de Cacela
- Vila Real de Santo António

== Vila Velha de Ródão ==
- Fratel
- Perais
- Sarnadas de Ródão
- Vila Velha de Ródão

== Vila Verde ==
- Aboim da Nóbrega
- Arcozelo
- Atães
- Atiães
- Azões
- Barbudo
- Barros
- Cabanelas
- Carreiras (Santiago)
- Carreiras (São Miguel)
- Cervães
- Codeceda
- Coucieiro
- Covas
- Dossãos
- Duas Igrejas
- Escariz (São Mamede)
- Escariz (São Martinho)
- Esqueiros
- Freiriz
- Geme
- Goães
- Godinhaços
- Gomide
- Gondiães
- Gondomar
- Laje
- Lanhas
- Loureira
- Marrancos
- Mós
- Moure
- Nevogilde
- Oleiros
- Oriz (Santa Marinha)
- Oriz (São Miguel)
- Parada de Gatim
- Passó
- Pedregais
- Penascais
- Pico
- Pico de Regalados
- Ponte
- Portela das Cabras
- Prado (São Miguel)
- Rio Mau
- Sabariz
- Sande
- Soutelo
- Travassós
- Turiz
- Valbom (São Martinho)
- Valbom (São Pedro)
- Valdreu
- Valões
- Vila de Prado
- Vila Verde
- Vilarinho

== Vila Viçosa ==
- Bencatel
- Ciladas
- Pardais
- Vila Viçosa (Conceição)
- Vila Viçosa (São Bartolomeu)

== Vimioso ==
- Algoso
- Angueira
- Argozelo
- Avelanoso
- Caçarelhos
- Campo de Víboras
- Carção
- Matela
- Pinelo
- Santulhão
- Uva
- Vale de Frades
- Vilar Seco
- Vimioso

== Vinhais ==
- Agrochão
- Alvaredos
- Candedo
- Celas
- Curopos
- Edral
- Edrosa
- Ervedosa
- Fresulfe
- Mofreita
- Moimenta
- Montouto
- Nunes
- Ousilhão
- Paçó
- Penhas Juntas
- Pinheiro Novo
- Quirás
- Rebordelo
- Santa Cruz
- Santalha
- São Jomil
- Sobreiro de Baixo
- Soeira
- Travanca
- Tuizelo
- Vale das Fontes
- Vale de Janeiro
- Vila Boa de Ousilhão
- Vila Verde
- Vilar de Lomba
- Vilar de Ossos
- Vilar de Peregrinos
- Vilar Seco de Lomba
- Vinhais

== Viseu ==
- Abraveses
- Barreiros
- Boa Aldeia
- Bodiosa
- Calde
- Campo
- Cavernães
- Cepões
- Cota
- Couto de Baixo
- Couto de Cima
- Fail (now Fail e Vila Chã de Sá)
- Farminhão
- Fragosela
- Lordosa
- Mundão
- Orgens
- Povolide
- Ranhados
- Repeses
- Ribafeita
- Rio de Loba
- Santos Evos
- São Cipriano
- São João de Lourosa
- São Pedro de France
- São Salvador
- Silgueiros
- Torredeita
- Vil de Souto
- Vila Chã de Sá
- Viseu (Coração de Jesus)
- Viseu (Santa Maria de Viseu)
- Viseu (São José)

== Vizela ==
- Caldas de Vizela (São João)
- Caldas de Vizela (São Miguel)
- Infias
- Santa Eulália
- Tagilde
- Vizela (Santo Adrião)
- Vizela (São Paio)
