= Mindelo (Vila do Conde) =

- Civil parish
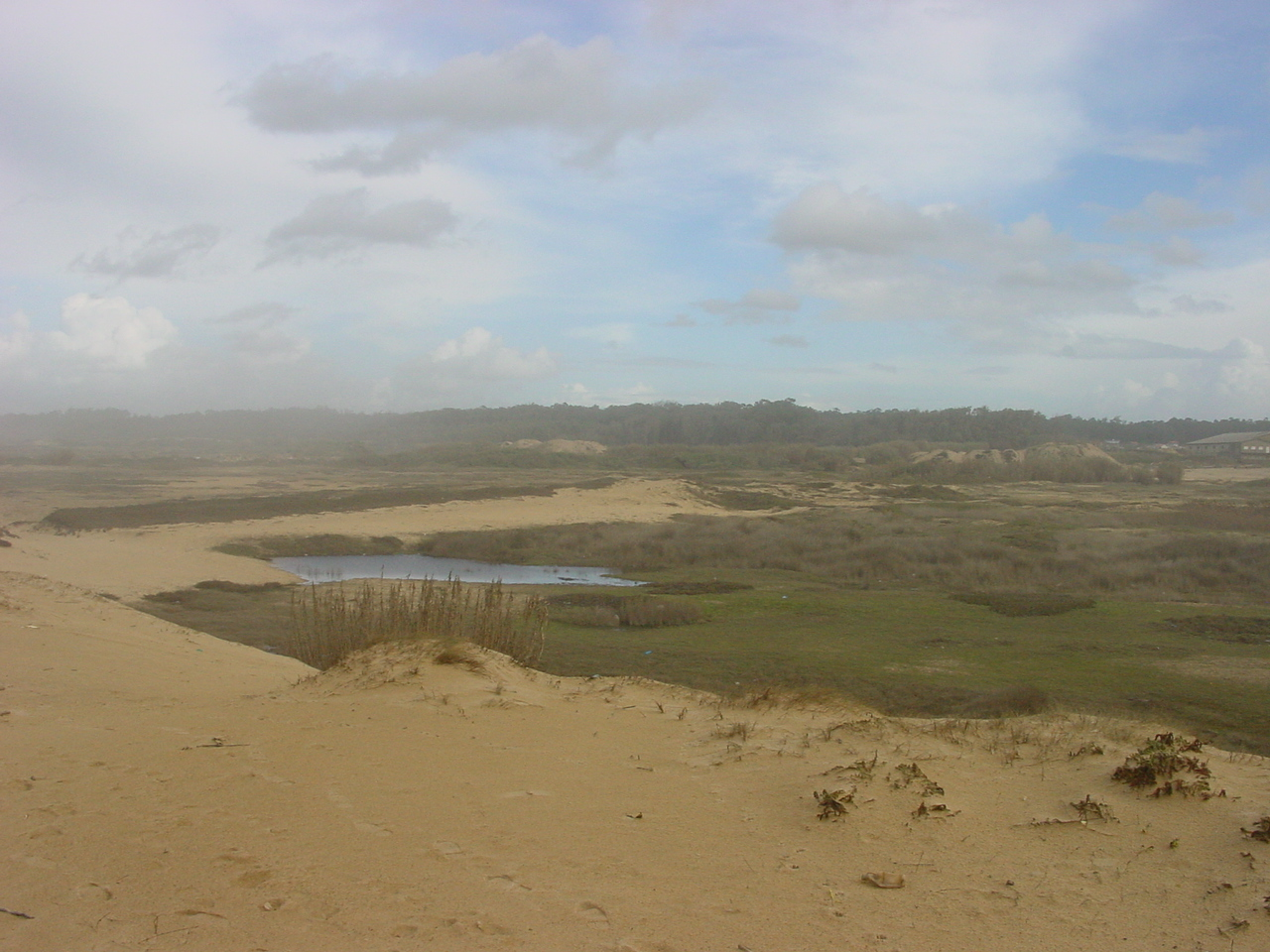
- Mindelo Ornithological Reserve

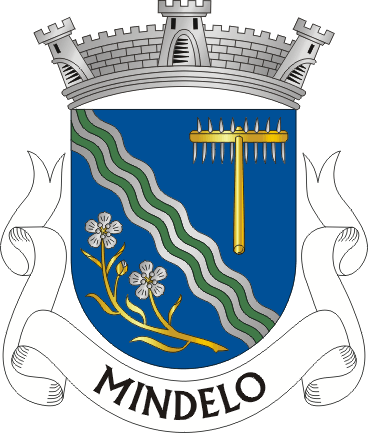
- Coat of arms

- Location in Portugal
- Coordinates: 41.314°N 8.720°W
- Country: Portugal
- Region: Norte
- Metropolitan area: Porto
- District: Porto
- Municipality: Vila do Conde

Area
  - Total: 5.74 km^{2} (2.22 sq mi)
- Elevation: 27 m (89 ft)

Population (2021)
  - Total: 3,988
  - Density: 695/km^{2} (1,800/sq mi)
- Time zone: UTC+00:00 (WET)
  - Summer (DST): UTC+01:00 (WEST)
- Postal code: 4485
- Area code: 252
- Patron: São João Baptista
- Website: www.jf-mindelo.pt

Mindelo is a civil parish in Vila do Conde Municipality, along the Green Coast in continental Portugal. Situated 21 km northwest of Porto, it is part of the Greater Metropolitan Area of Porto. The population in 2021 was 3,988, in an area of 5.74 square kilometres (2.22 mi^{2}).

Until the first decades of the 20th century the term Mindelo may have been used to refer not only to the locality of Mindelo, but also to a larger area between the River Ave and the mouth of the River Leça.

== History ==
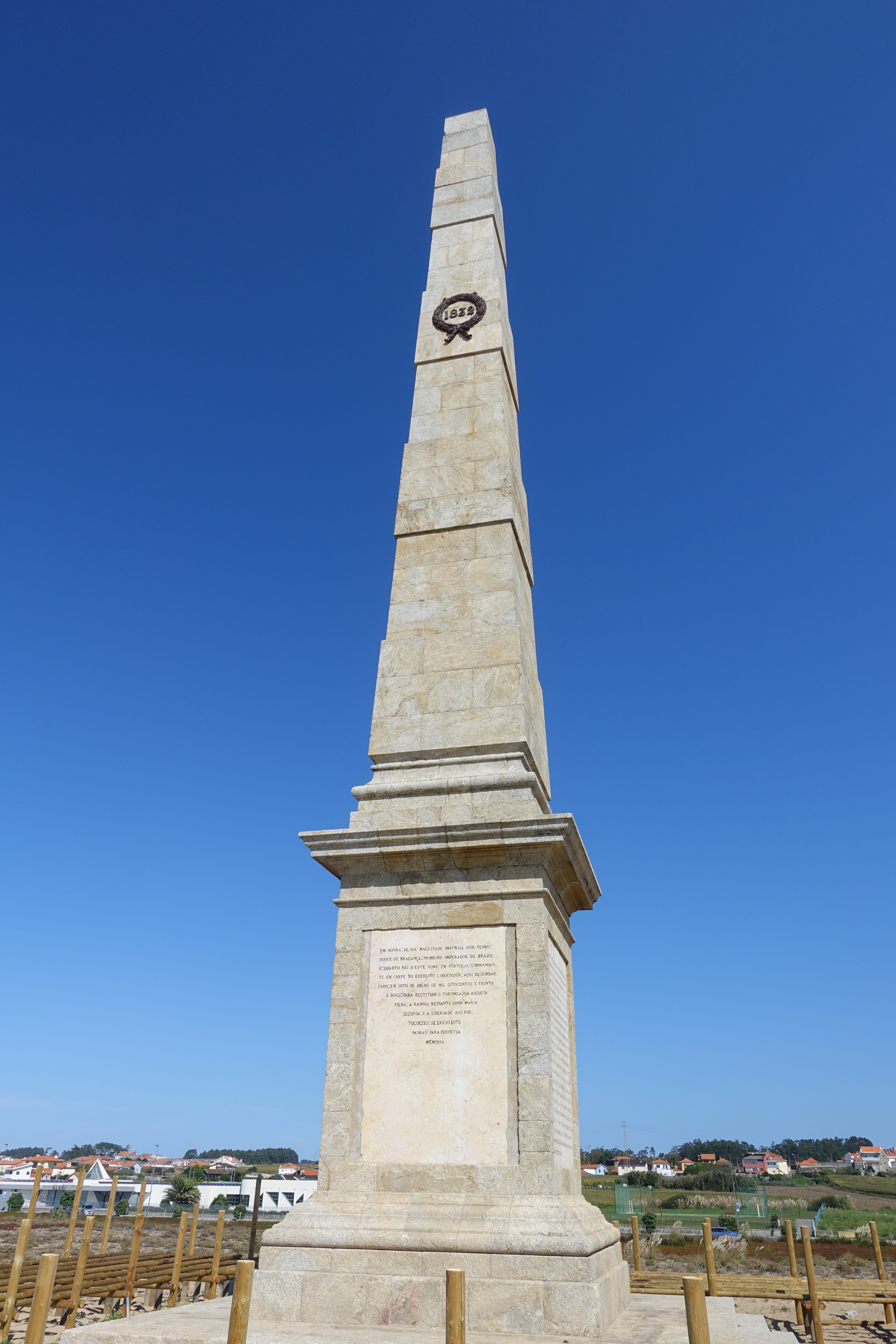
The monument to liberal forces that disembarked during a campaign of the Liberal Wars.

"Great little smell of pine, I don't know others similar, Of the pinery of Mindelo, Which is a beautiful pinery, Where in Azurara begins, And in Porto ends..."

A land with more than 1000 years of history, the first documents from Mindelo date back to the 10th century. The first registered reference to the region, dates back to 1068, to the village of Amidjelus, that would become Mindelo. Other resources suggest that the local toponymy developed from the terms Amenidello, Amenitello, Amenitelo or Menidello, from the name of a knight, during the age of Vimara Peres, who settled in the area and battled Arab forces.

Ancestral records and property titles are also mentioned in successive records for 1069, 1081, 1082, 1095 and 1127. After administrative reforms in 1258, clearer records identified the places within the parish, such as Igreja, Passos, Pinheiro, Gondosendo, Outeiro, Manhalde and Paredes. Each of these localities were composed of many families, while a few pertained specifically to the King. This was related to Medieval donations of land or testaments that left many of those properties in the hands of the church, such as the Monasteries of Vairão, Moreira, Santo Tirso and Roriz.

In 1081, Mindelo had their own religious temple, located in Burgal (which itself received its name from its populational movement, developed from the toponym burgh). The current church dates back to the 18th century, as shown by the signing of contracts with masons and carpenters in 1770.

In the 16th century, King Manuel of Portugal in Évora issued a regal charter (Portuguese: foral) to the municipality of Maia, which included Mindelo at the time. Since 6 November 1836, it was integrated into the municipality of Vila do Conde. At the time, 100 households were established in the parish of Mindelo. The delineation of the ecclesiastical parish of Mindelo dates back to 20 October 1611, when the Monastery of Moreira defined its limits in the presence of the abbeys of Fajozes and Vila Chã, representatives of Cabido da Sé do Porto and the Monastery of Vairão.

In 1832, during the Liberal Wars, the landing at Mindelo took place in the beach of Arnosa de Pampelido. Under the command of Peter IV, troops arriving from the Azores, disembarked along the beach on 8 July 1832, before proceeding to Porto. While the landing was named after Mindelo, its location was not in the parish of Mindelo, but rather in the modern day parishes of Perafita and Lavra, in Matosinhos. It may have taken Mindelo's name as the term may have been used to refer to a large area between the River Ave and the mouth of the River Leça until the first decades of the 20th century. This area was a curacy (a small ecclesiastical division) under the administration of the Canons Regular of St. Augustine from the Convent of Moreira da Maia.

== Geography ==
=== Physical geography ===
Mindelo is part of the Porto Metropolitan Area, in the coastal part of northwestern Portugal. It is located 5 kilometres southeast of the municipal seat (Vila do Conde), 8 kilometres from the harbour of Póvoa de Varzim and 21 kilometres northwest of the city of Porto. The parish is bordered by the parishes of Vila Chã and Modivas to the south, Fajozes to the east and Árvore to the north, while to its west lies the Atlantic Ocean.

=== Ecoregions/Protected areas ===
The Reserva Ornitológica de Mindelo (ROM) (English: Mindelo Ornithological Reserve), created on 2 September 1957, through the initiative of Santos Júnior, is the first protected area created in Portugal, and the only coastal area in the Porto Metropolitan Area that has maintained its natural characteristics. The area is around six km^{2} 6 square kilometres (600 ha) and includes parts of the beaches, farmlands, botanical gardens and areas of Ribeira de Silvares. The Ornithological Reserve features avian scientific studies and includes 150 species of birds, in addition to mammals and amphibian species.

With the creation of the Área de Paisagem Protegida do Litoral de Vila do Conde the parish has begun to concentrate on eco-tourism.

=== Human geography ===
The parish contains the settlements Igreja, Gondosendo, Manhalde, Outeiro, Paredes, Passos and Pinheiro. Mindelo is accessed with the national road N13 and the A28 motorway. It has a station on the Porto Metro Line B. It is 9 km northwest from Francisco Sá Carneiro Airport.

== Economy ==
Initially, the community was based in agriculture, then later fishery, and lastly seasonal tourism. Today, agriculture and industry remain essential to the local economy, in particular textiles.

Mindelo is the first parish in Portugal to have the Agenda 21 local, an involvement on the community on identification problems and the definition of prioritites, as well as its quality of life.

== Architecture ==
- Church of São João Evangelista (English: Saint John the Evanglist) - dating back to the 18th century;
- Chapel of São Pedro dos Mareabtes (English: Saint Peter of Marebtes) - constructed in the 20th century

Other buildings typical of the parish, and important architectural, are related with agriculture and include the buildings along the Rua do Covelo and Rua de Paredes, in addition to the Vila Corina estate (dating back to the 19th century), but today operating as a lyceum.

== Culture ==
The parish has several community groups that support local initiatives, including the Associação dos Amigos do Mindelo para a Defesa do Ambiente (an environmental group), the Associação Cultural e Desportiva de Mindelo (ACDM) (a sports association), the Associação Recreativa Rancho Regional de Mindelo (ARRRM) (a choral group), the Centro Social de Mindelo – IPSS (community centre) and the Corpo Nacional de Escutas – Agrupamento 572 (scouts).

Apart from religious celebrations throughout many of the villages, the parish is known for the Festival de concertinas e cantares ao desafio (occurring in the spring), and the Festival Folclórico (in the second Sunday in August).

== Sport ==
Located along the seaside, Mindelo possesses special conditions to support water sports. Surfing, bodyboading and kite-surfing are practiced by locals and visiters from Grande Porto, since 1990, including at the beach of Pinhal (to the north).
