= Jaleh =

Jaleh or Jeleh (Persian: جله) may refer to:

- Jaleh, Aligudarz
- Jaleh, Dorud

== See also ==
- Jale (disambiguation)
- Zhaleh (disambiguation)
