= Jale =

Jale may refer to:

- Jale (name), a given name and surname
- Jale (Vidhan Sabha constituency), Bihar, India
- Jale, Bihar, a town in Darbhanga District, India
- Jale (band), a Canadian alternative rock band.
- a fictional color from the 1920 novel A Voyage to Arcturus by David Lindsay

== See also ==
- Jael, biblical figure
- Jaleh (disambiguation)
- Jales (disambiguation)
- Jail (disambiguation)
