= Zhaleh =

Zhaleh may refer to:

- Zhaleh Olov (1927–2024), Iranian actress, dubber, and poet
- Jale (disambiguation)
- Zhaleh-ye Kuseh, a village in Iran
