= Alvarães =

Alvarães may refer to:

- Alvarães, Amazonas
- Alvarães (Viana do Castelo), a parish in Portugal
