= André Pinto (footballer, born 1994) =

Portuguese footballer

Personal information
- Full name: André Filipe Silva Pinto
- Date of birth: 29 April 1994 (age 32)
- Place of birth: Árvore-Vila do Conde, Portugal
- Height: 1.93 m (6 ft 4 in)
- Position: Midfielder

Team information
- Current team: Pedras Salgadas
- Number: 20

Youth career
- 2003–2013: Vizela

Senior career*
Years	Team	Apps	(Gls)
2012–2018	Vizela	112	(6)
2018–2019	Mirandela	14	(1)
2019	Trofense	8	(0)
2019–2020	Merelinense	23	(2)
2020–	Pedras Salgadas	21	(0)
- * Club domestic league appearances and goals as of 1 August 2021 (UTC)

André Filipe Silva Pinto (born 29 April 1994 in Árvore - Vila do Conde) is a Portuguese footballer who plays for Juventude de Pedras Salgadas, as a midfielder.

== Club career ==
On 31 July 2016, Pinto made his professional debut with Vizela in a 2016–17 Taça da Liga match against Fafe.
