= André Pinto =

André Pinto may refer to:

- André Pinto (footballer, born 1978), Brazilian football forward
- André Pinto (footballer, born 1989), Portuguese football defender
- André Pinto (footballer, born 1994), Portuguese football midfielder
