= Mafamude e Vilar do Paraíso =

- Civil parish
- Location in Portugal
- Coordinates: 41.11°N 8.61°W
- Country: Portugal
- Region: Norte
- Metropolitan area: Porto
- District: Porto
- Municipality: Vila Nova de Gaia

Area
  - Total: 10.58 km^{2} (4.08 sq mi)

Population (2011)
  - Total: 52,422
  - Density: 4,955/km^{2} (12,830/sq mi)
- Time zone: UTC+00:00 (WET)
  - Summer (DST): UTC+01:00 (WEST)

Mafamude e Vilar do Paraíso is a civil parish in the municipality of Vila Nova de Gaia, Portugal. It was formed in 2013 by the merger of the former parishes Mafamude and Vilar do Paraíso. The population in 2011 was 52,422, in an area of 10.58 km².
