= Arcos (Vila do Conde) =

- Civil parish
- Location of Arcos in the municipality of Vila do Conde
- Coordinates: 41°23′51″N 8°39′21″W
- Country: Portugal
- Region: Norte
- Metropolitan area: Porto
- District: Porto
- Municipality: Vila do Conde
- Disbanded: 2013

Area
  - Total: 5.81 km^{2} (2.24 sq mi)
- Elevation: 51 m (167 ft)

Population (2011)
  - Total: 819
  - Density: 140/km^{2} (370/sq mi)
- Time zone: UTC+00:00 (WET)
  - Summer (DST): UTC+01:00 (WEST)
- Postal code: 4480-020
- Area code: 252
- Patron: São Miguel

Arcos is a former civil parish in the municipality of Vila do Conde, Portugal. In 2013, the parish merged into Rio Mau e Arcos, a newer parish. In 2011 the population was 819 in an area of 5.81 km^{2}. It is situated on the Ave River near the north-eastern frontier with the municipality of Barcelos, and resides in the shadow of its larger municipal neighbor.

== History ==
The exact toponymy of this parish is not certain. It may have been named after a Casais Moorish castle with the same name, a Roman bridge near Monte da Reguenga, or a subterranean road that led to the Este River, where travelers stopped to water their horses. It is very likely that a medieval castle existed in Argifonso, since multiple structures and a castro were discovered in the vicinity, but Moorish influences in the Iberian peninsula only occurred at the end of 711. During Roman occupation, any settlements would have maintained cultivated fields, causing the abandonment of the castros. The Castro of Casais still presents vestiges of the Castro culture and Roman artifacts. Legend refers to an ecclesiastical parish dedicated to Sant'Iago in Moldes, although no documented proof of this legend exists.

The parish's landmark, the bridge spanning the Ave River, dates back to the 12th century, though historians suggest that an ancient bridge spanned the river prior to 1140. Medieval documents refer to this bridge as the via vecteris (old way), alluding to its Roman origin.

In 1836, Arcos was included as part of Vila do Conde.

There is a reference to São Miguel de Arcos in the ecclesiastical census in Braga and Guimarães during the 11th century (1078-1091). However, neither records from the census administered by bishop D. Pedro, in the Sé Cathedral in Braga, nor the 1220 inventory of Afonso II of Portugal ever refer to Arcos as an ecclesiastical parish.

== Geography ==
Population of Arcos (1900 - 2001)
Year	Pop.	±%
1900	630	—
1911	649	+3.0%
1920	636	−2.0%
1930	732	+15.1%
1940	807	+10.2%
1950	781	−3.2%
1960	852	+9.1%
1970	770	−9.6%
1981	891	+15.7%
1991	853	−4.3%
2001	869	+1.9%

Arcos is situated north of the Ave River and alongside the Este River in the north-eastern portion of Vila de Condo, near the municipality of Barcelos.

The Roman-style Ponte d'Ave (later Ponte de São Miguel) that crosses the Ave River north in the direction of Rates, and eventually to Santiago de Compostela.

== Architecture ==
=== Civic ===
- Bridge of São Miguel (Portuguese: Ponte de São Miguel de Arcos) - Saint Michael's Bridge, along the regional EN306 roadway outside Arcos. The medieval bridge is of a cantilever construction of granite with three arches dating back to the 12th century. The voussoir (arching bricks) are straight, extra-hard but irregular, with the central arch the largest of the construction.
- Estate of Quinta de São Miguel de Arcos

=== Religious ===
- Chapel of Senhor dos Desamparados (Portuguese: Capela do Senhor dos Desemparados)
- Church of São Miguel (Portuguese: Igreja Paroquial de Arcos/Igreja de São Miguel)

== Notable citizens ==
- José Maria Campos Trocado - responsible for contributing a memorial in the form of a cross to mark the parish's Christianity in the area of Rego. It was inaugurated in December 2009.
