= Vialonga polyantha =

Scientific classification
- Domain: Eukaryota
- Kingdom: Animalia
- Phylum: Arthropoda
- Class: Insecta
- Order: Lepidoptera
- Family: Tortricidae
- Genus: Vialonga
- Species: V. polyantha

Binomial name
- Vialonga polyantha Diakonoff, 1960

Species of moth

Vialonga polyantha is a species of moth of the family Tortricidae. It is found on Madagascar.
