= Mindelo Ornithological Reserve =

Coordinates: 41°19′23″N 8°43′52″W

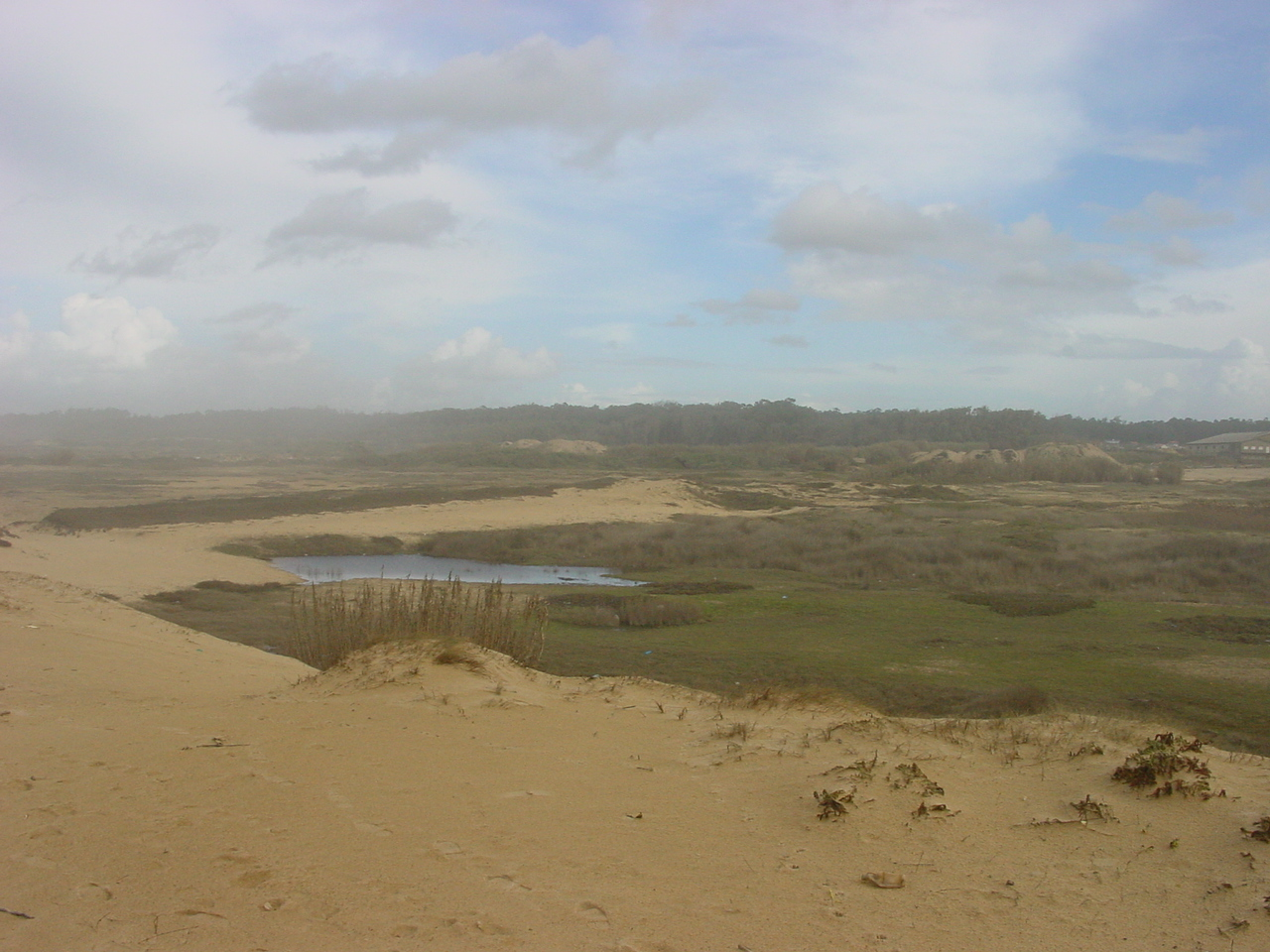
Mindelo Ornithological Reserve

The Mindelo Ornithological Reserve (Portuguese: Reserva Ornitológica de Mindelo; ROM) is a bird reserve in Portugal. It is located in the coastal zone of the North Region, in the municipality of Vila do Conde, about 20 km (12 mi) from Porto. It occupies an area of around 6 million square meters.

It was created in 1957 in order to protect resident and migratory birds, forest and dunes, being the first area for nature conservation in Portugal. It is also said to be the first ornithological reserve in Europe. Santos Junior, professor in the Faculty of Sciences of the University of Porto, proposed the creation of the reserve and initiated the bird banding in Portugal with the help from roleiros. Roleiros are turtle dove catchers using nets with traditional methods. From 1953 to 1989, about 20,000 doves were captured for bird ringing.

== External reference ==
- Mindelo Ornithological Reserve on natural.pt
