= Jales (disambiguation) =

Jales is a town in Brazil.

Jaleș is a tributary of the river Tismana in Romania.

Jales may also refer to:

- Microregion of Jales, on the northwest of São Paulo state, Brazil
- Roman Catholic Diocese of Jales
- Alfarela de Jales, a parish of Portugal, in Vila Pouca de Aguiar, Vila Real
- Vreia de Jales, a parish of Portugal, in Vila Pouca de Aguiar, Vila Real

== People with the surname ==
- Dick Jales (1922–2004), English professional footballer
- Otacilio Jales, (born 1984), Brazilian footballer
