= Gomide =

Gomide is a surname. Notable people with the surname include:

- Elza Furtado Gomide (1925–2013), Brazilian mathematician
- Fernando Gomide, Brazilian electrical engineer
- Francisco Luiz Sibut Gomide (born 1945), Brazilian politician
- Rubens Otoni Gomide (born 1956), Brazilian professor and politician
