= Pedroso e Seixezelo =

- Civil parish
- Location in Portugal
- Coordinates: 41.06°N 8.56°W
- Country: Portugal
- Region: Norte
- Metropolitan area: Porto
- District: Porto
- Municipality: Vila Nova de Gaia

Area
  - Total: 20.88 km^{2} (8.06 sq mi)

Population (2011)
  - Total: 20,426
  - Density: 980/km^{2} (2,500/sq mi)
- Time zone: UTC+00:00 (WET)
  - Summer (DST): UTC+01:00 (WEST)

Pedroso e Seixezelo is a civil parish in the municipality of Vila Nova de Gaia, Portugal. It was formed in 2013 by the merger of the former parishes Pedroso and Seixezelo. The population in 2011 was 20,426, in an area of 20.88 km^{2}.
