= Rio Mau e Arcos =

- Civil parish
- Location in Portugal
- Coordinates: 41.399°N 8.676°W
- Country: Portugal
- Region: Norte
- Metropolitan area: Porto
- District: Porto
- Municipality: Vila do Conde

Area
  - Total: 15.70 km^{2} (6.06 sq mi)

Population (2011)
  - Total: 2,681
  - Density: 170.8/km^{2} (442.3/sq mi)
- Time zone: UTC+00:00 (WET)
  - Summer (DST): UTC+01:00 (WEST)

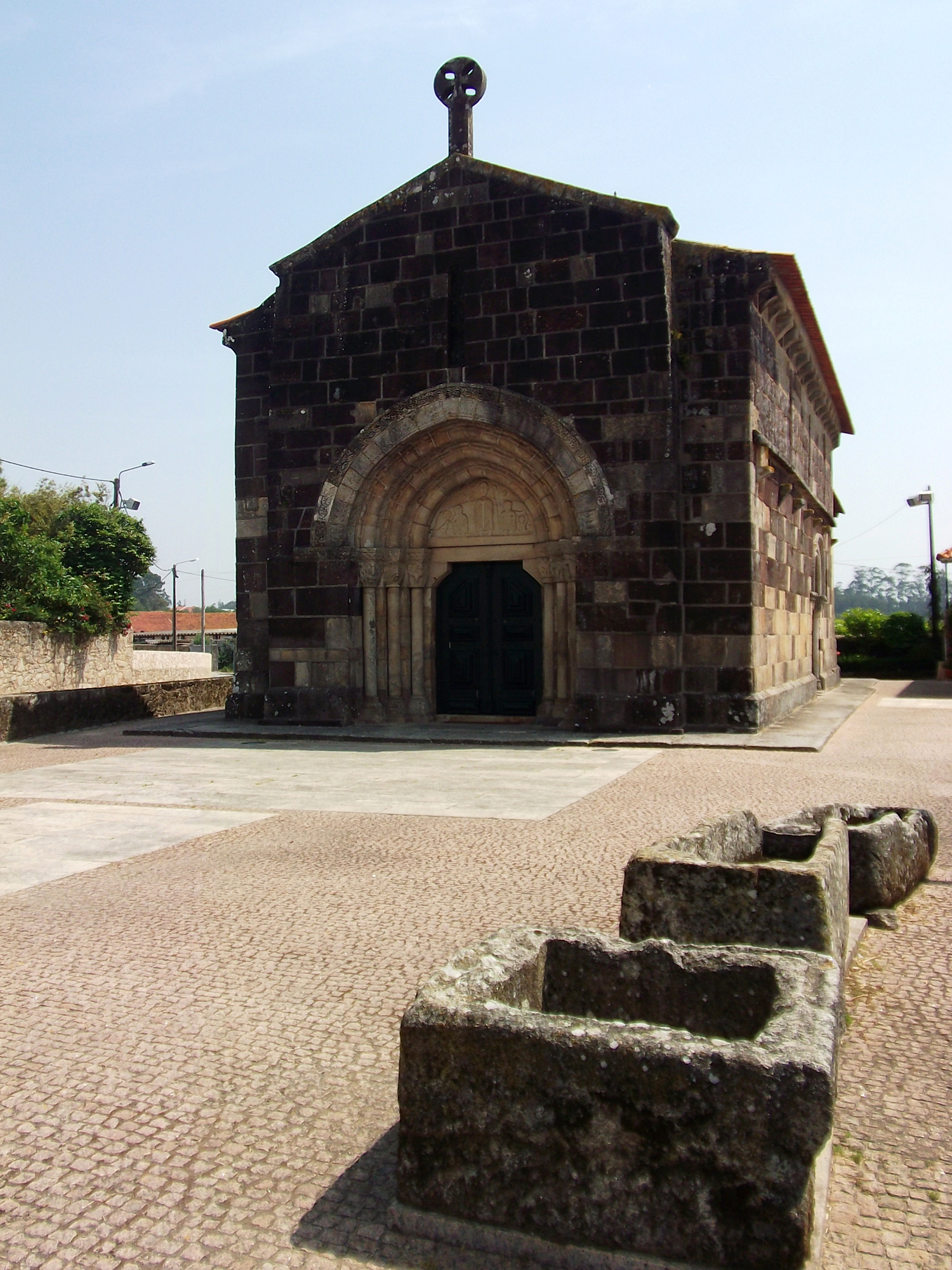
Rio Mau Church

Rio Mau e Arcos is a civil parish in the municipality of Vila do Conde, Portugal. It was formed in 2013 by the merger of the former parishes Rio Mau and Arcos. The population in 2011 was 2,681, in an area of 15.70 km².
