= Gião (Vila do Conde) =

- Civil parish
- Location in Portugal
- Coordinates: 41.310°N 8.674°W
- Country: Portugal
- Region: Norte
- Metropolitan area: Porto
- District: Porto
- Municipality: Vila do Conde

Area
  - Total: 5.66 km^{2} (2.19 sq mi)

Population (2011)
  - Total: 1,756
  - Density: 310/km^{2} (804/sq mi)
- Time zone: UTC+00:00 (WET)
  - Summer (DST): UTC+01:00 (WEST)

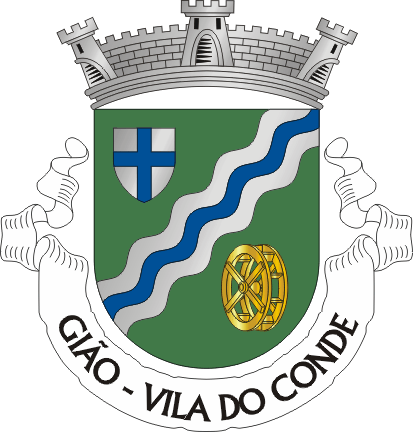
Symbol of the city of Giao

Gião is a civil parish in the municipality of Vila do Conde, Portugal. The population in 2011 was 1,756, in an area of 5.66 km².
