= Jale (name) =

- Pronunciation: [ˈʒale]
- Gender: Female

Origin
- Origin: Persian
- Meaning: Dew, Hail Stone

Other names
- Alternative spelling: Jaleh, Jhale, Zhaleh

Jale (also spelled Jaleh, or Zhaleh, Persian: ژاله) is a common given name and surname of Persian origin, used in Iran and Turkey, meaning hail stone. The name Jale can also translate to "dew" or "dewdrop".

Notable people with the name include:

== Jale ==
=== Given name ===
- Jale Arıkan (born 1965), Turkish-German actress
- Jale Aylanç (1948–2020), Turkish actress
- Jale Bainisika (1914/1915–2020), Fijian military officer
- Jale Birsel (1927–2019), Turkish actress
- Jale İnan (1914–2001), Turkish archaeologist
- Jale Vakaloloma (born 1996), Fijian rugby union player
- Jale Yılmabaşar (born 1939), Turkish painter and ceramicist.

=== Middle name ===
- Elif Jale Yeşilırmak (born 1986), Turkish wrestler of Russian origin

=== Surname ===
- Afife Jale (1902-1941), Turkish stage actress
- Anare Jale (born c. 1949), Fijian civil servant
- Grace Jale (born 1999), New Zealand football player

== Jaleh ==
- Jaleh Amouzgar (born 1939), Iranian historian
- Jaleh Daie (born 1948), American scientist, educator and entrepreneur
- Jaleh Esfahani (1921–2007), Iranian poet
- Jaleh Mansoor (born 1975), Canadian art historian, critic and academic
- Sane Jaleh (1985–2011), Iranian student protester

== Zhaleh ==
- Zhaleh Kazemi (1944–2003), Iranian artist
- Zhaleh Olov (1927-2024), Iranian actress
