= Pedroso, Portugal =

Coordinates: 41.064°N 8.556°W

Location of Pedroso in Vila Nova de Gaia.

Pedroso is a former civil parish in the municipality of Vila Nova de Gaia, Portugal. In 2013, the parish merged into the new parish Pedroso e Seixezelo. The population in 2011 was 18,714, in an area of 19.43 km^{2}.

== Heritage ==
- Castro da Senhora da Saúde ou Monte Murado
