= Mafamude =

Civil parish in Portugal (defunct since 2013)

Coordinates: 41.135°N 8.617°W

Location of Mafamude in Vila Nova de Gaia.

Mafamude is a former civil parish in the municipality of Vila Nova de Gaia, Portugal. In 2013, the parish merged into the new parish Mafamude e Vilar do Paraíso. The population in 2011 was 38,544, in an area of 5.28 km². It is an urban parish in the city of Gaia.

== Heritage ==
- Cedro Primary School (Escola Primária do Cedro)

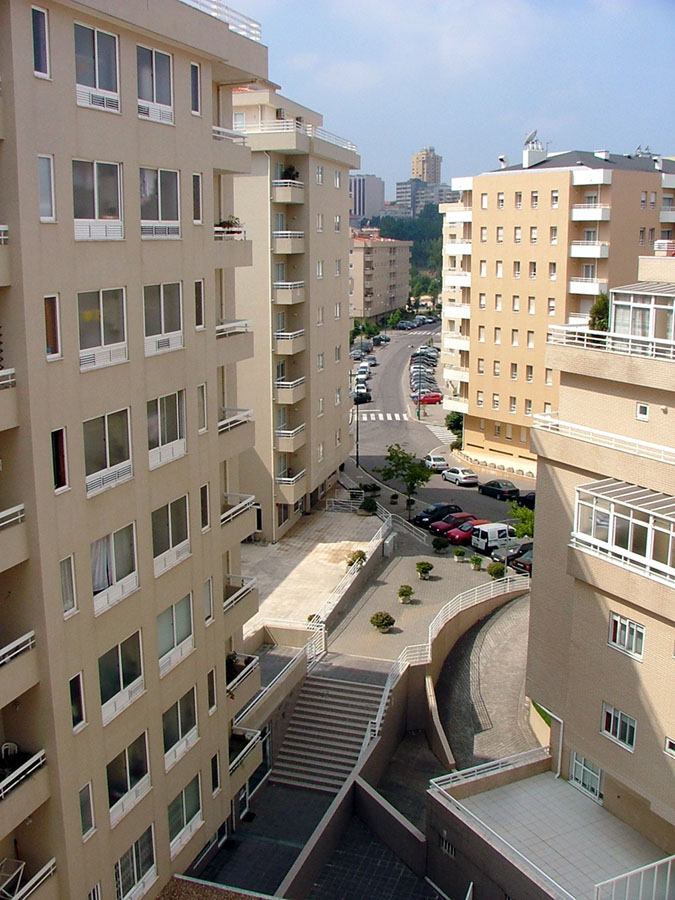
Apartment buildings in Mafamude.

== Notable people from Mafamude ==
- António Soares dos Reis
- Claudio Braga
