= São João de Lourosa =

- Civil parish
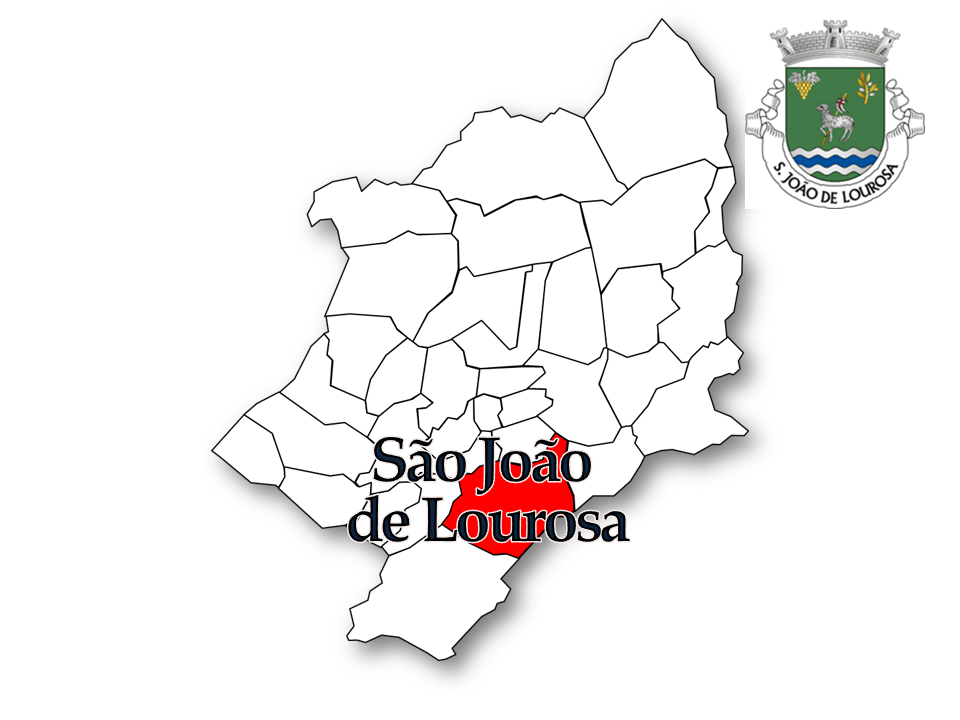
- Coordinates: 40°36′54″N 7°54′23″W
- Country: Portugal
- Region: Centro
- Intermunic. comm.: Viseu Dão Lafões
- District: Viseu
- Municipality: Viseu

Area
  - Total: 24.30 km^{2} (9.38 sq mi)

Population (2011)
  - Total: 4,702
  - Density: 190/km^{2} (500/sq mi)
- Time zone: UTC+00:00 (WET)
  - Summer (DST): UTC+01:00 (WEST)
- Patron: John the Baptist
- Website: http://freguesia-sjlourosa.pt/portal/

São João de Lourosa is a civil parish in the municipality of Viseu, Portugal. It has 24.30 km^{2} and had 4702 inhabitants in the 2011 census.
