= Jaleh, Dorud =

Village in Lorestan, Iran

Jaleh جله
- Village
- Location within Iran
- Coordinates: 33°21′52″N 49°01′55″E
- Country: Iran
- Province: Lorestan
- County: Dorud
- Bakhsh: Central
- Rural District: Dorud

Population (2006)
  - Total: 49
- Time zone: UTC+3:30 (IRST)
  - Summer (DST): UTC+4:30 (IRDT)

Jaleh (Persian: جله) is a village in Dorud Rural District, in the Central District of Dorud County, Lorestan Province, Iran. At the 2006 census, its population was 49 people, in 12 families.
