= Gafanha da Boa Hora =

- Civil parish
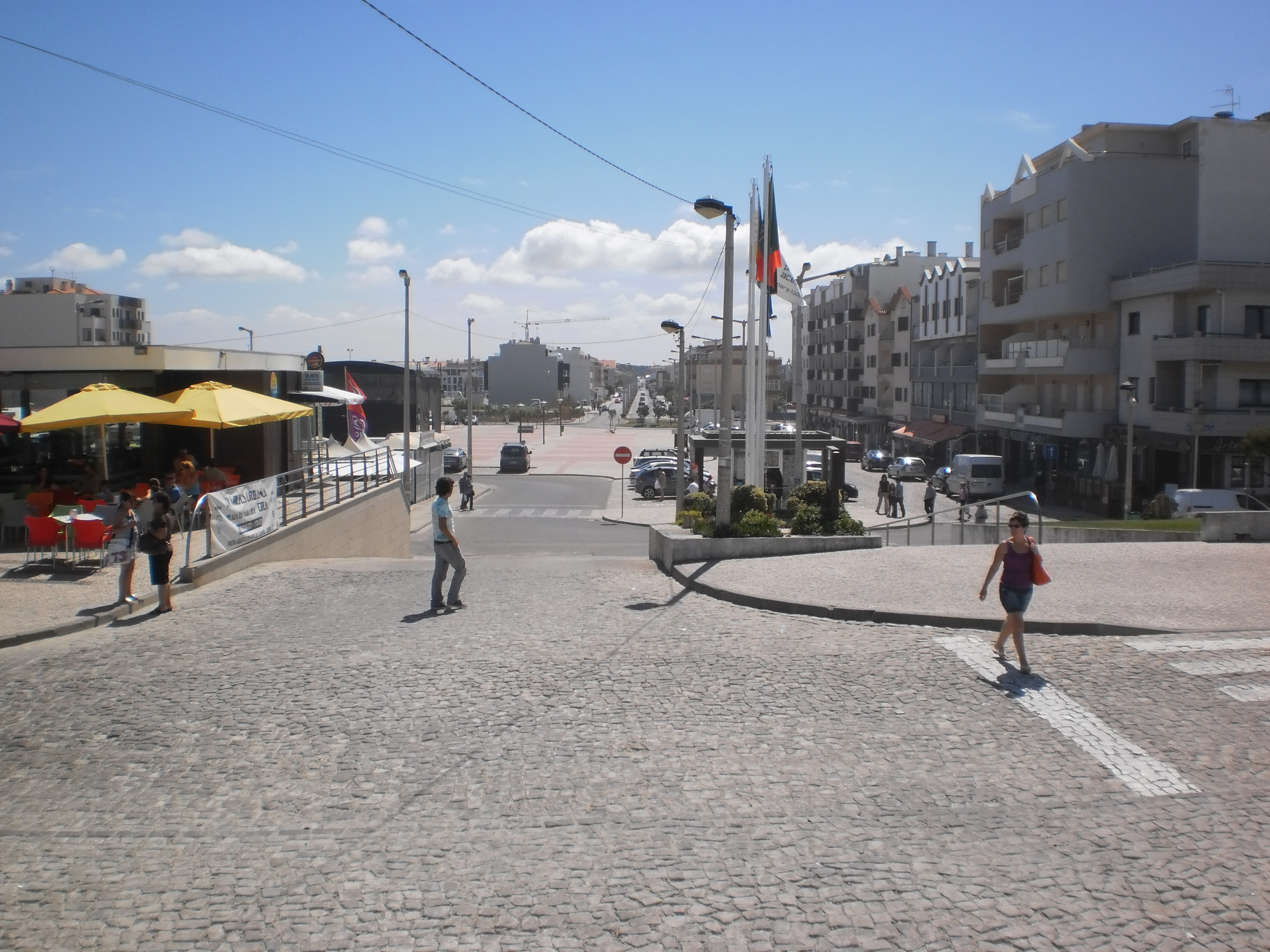

- Location in Portugal
- Coordinates: 40°33′06″N 8°45′26″W
- Country: Portugal
- Region: Centro
- Intermunic. comm.: Região de Aveiro
- District: Aveiro
- Municipality: Vagos

Area
  - Total: 37.10 km^{2} (14.32 sq mi)

Population (2011)
  - Total: 2,625
  - Density: 70.75/km^{2} (183.3/sq mi)
- Time zone: UTC+00:00 (WET)
  - Summer (DST): UTC+01:00 (WEST)

Gafanha da Boa Hora is a village and a civil parish of the municipality of Vagos, Portugal. The population in 2011 was 2,625, in an area of 37.10 km^{2}.
