= Santo André de Vagos =

- Civil parish
- Location in Portugal
- Coordinates: 40°30′36″N 8°40′33″W
- Country: Portugal
- Region: Centro
- Intermunic. comm.: Região de Aveiro
- District: Aveiro
- Municipality: Vagos

Area
  - Total: 12.44 km^{2} (4.80 sq mi)

Population (2011)
  - Total: 2,033
  - Density: 160/km^{2} (420/sq mi)
- Time zone: UTC+00:00 (WET)
  - Summer (DST): UTC+01:00 (WEST)

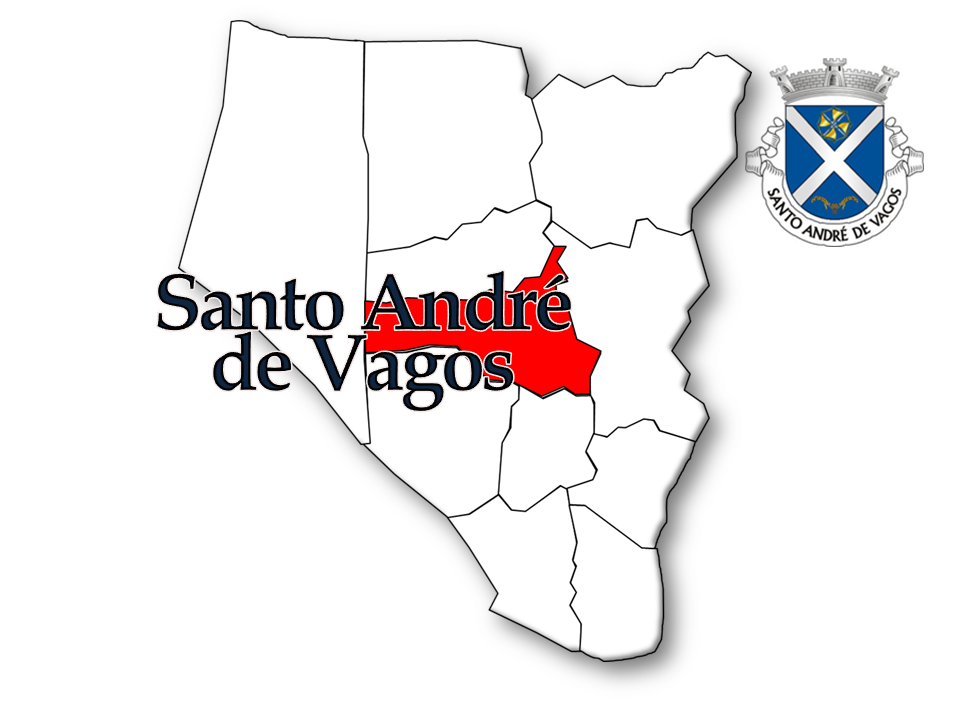
Santo André de Vagos

Santo André de Vagos is a village and a civil parish of the municipality of Vagos, Portugal. The population in 2011 was 2,033, in an area of 12.44 km^{2}.
