= Vila de Prado =

Vila de Prado is a Portuguese civil parish located in the Vila Verde municipality that is located in the Braga district. Its current president is Albano Bastos.

The location used to be called Prado (Santa Maria) until 1991 when the village status was granted to it, making its name be Vila de Prado.

== History ==
=== Period of Roman domination ===
Due to its strategic location it constituted an important populational focus during Roman domination. Its clayey nature might have also contributed to such, as at the time, the ceramic industry was proliferating.

=== Tenth to sixteenth centuries ===
Throughout the course of the tenth century Prado was dominated by Portuguese counts. During the afonsine inquiries of 1220, Prado contained 16 parishes. In 1260 D.Afonso III granted foral to it. Prior to the Prado parish was one called Santiago de Francelos that is referenced in documents from 1445 but that by 1528 had already been assimilated by Prado. In 1510 another fora would be granted to it, this time by D.Manuel.

=== Nineteenth to twentieth centuries ===
Studies of the Maria da Fonte revolt allude to an outbreak of a rebellion in Vila de Prado on the 15th of April 1846. It is thought that it was due to this revolt that on the 24th of October 1855 the municipality of Prado was abolished together with the Penela, Vila Chã and Pico de Regalados municipalities. After this Prado became integrated into the new Vila Verde municipality with its parishes being distributed between the Vila Verde, Barcelos and Braga municipalities. By initiative of deputies Alberto Cerqueira de Oliveira and Amândio Santa Cruz Domingos Basto Oliveira, Prado regained its Vila status on the 20th of June 1991.

== Government ==
Executive
Role	Person currently with the role
President	Albano Bastos
Secretary	Higínio Castilho
Treasurer	Sónia Araújo

Assembly
Role	Person/People currently with the role
President	Nuno Emanuel Pimentel de Queirós
1st Secretary	Vânia Isabel Fernandes Duarte
2nd Secretary	Leandro Peixoto Ferreira
Member	Emanuel de Jesus Antunes Machado, Carla Henriqueta da Costa Barbosa Pereira, João Gouveia de Macedo, Jorge Manuel de Sousa Gouveia Forte, Ana Margarida Barbosa Castilho, João Gomes da Silva

== Points of interest ==
- Capela de São Tiago de Francelos: Chapel located in Francelos
- Casa da Botica: Building built in 1720 to house the Paulo Silva family
- Ponte de Prado: Bridge that crosses the Cávado River
- Capela de Nossa Senhora do Bom Sucesso: Chapel located in the civil parish's historic center

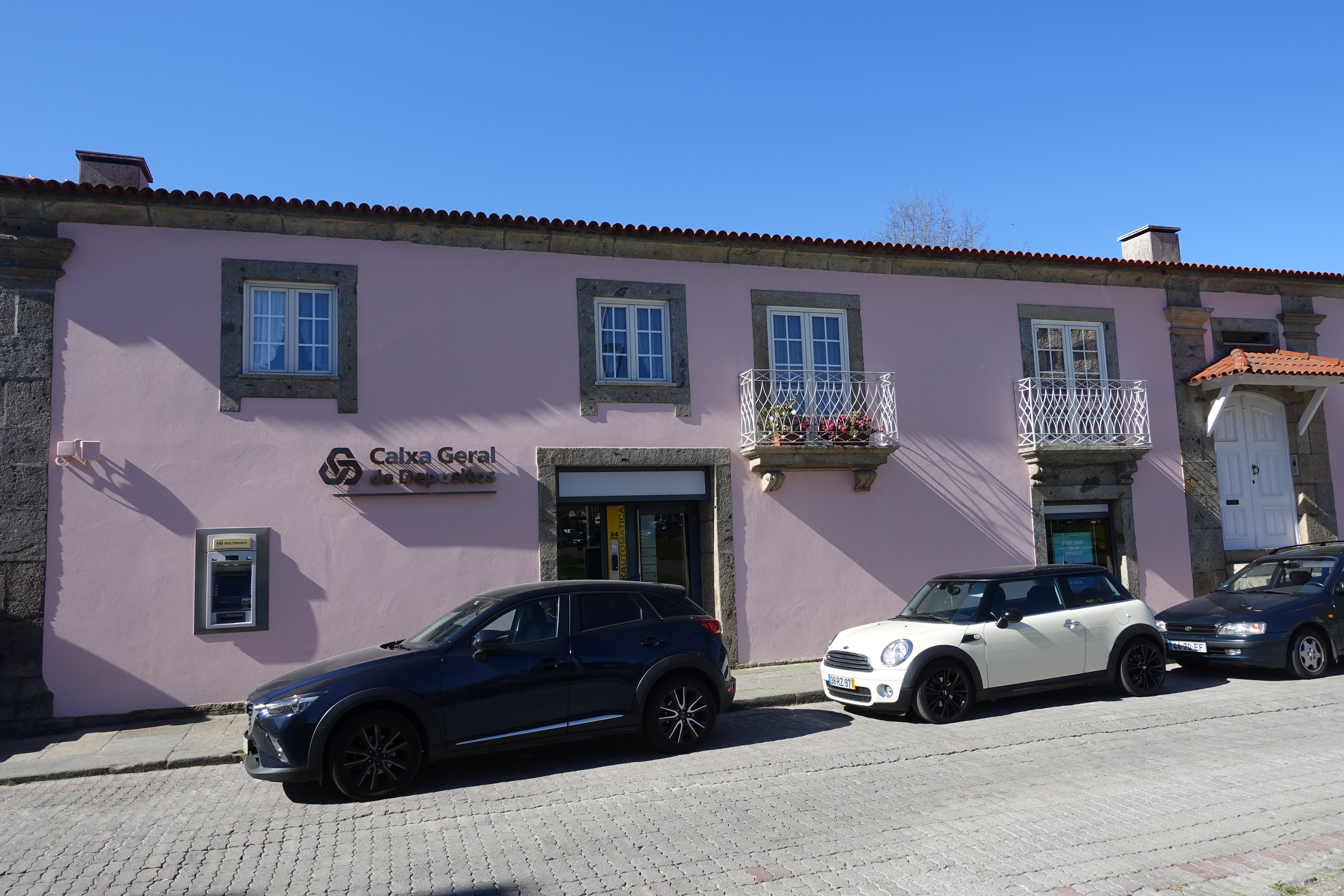
Casa da Botica

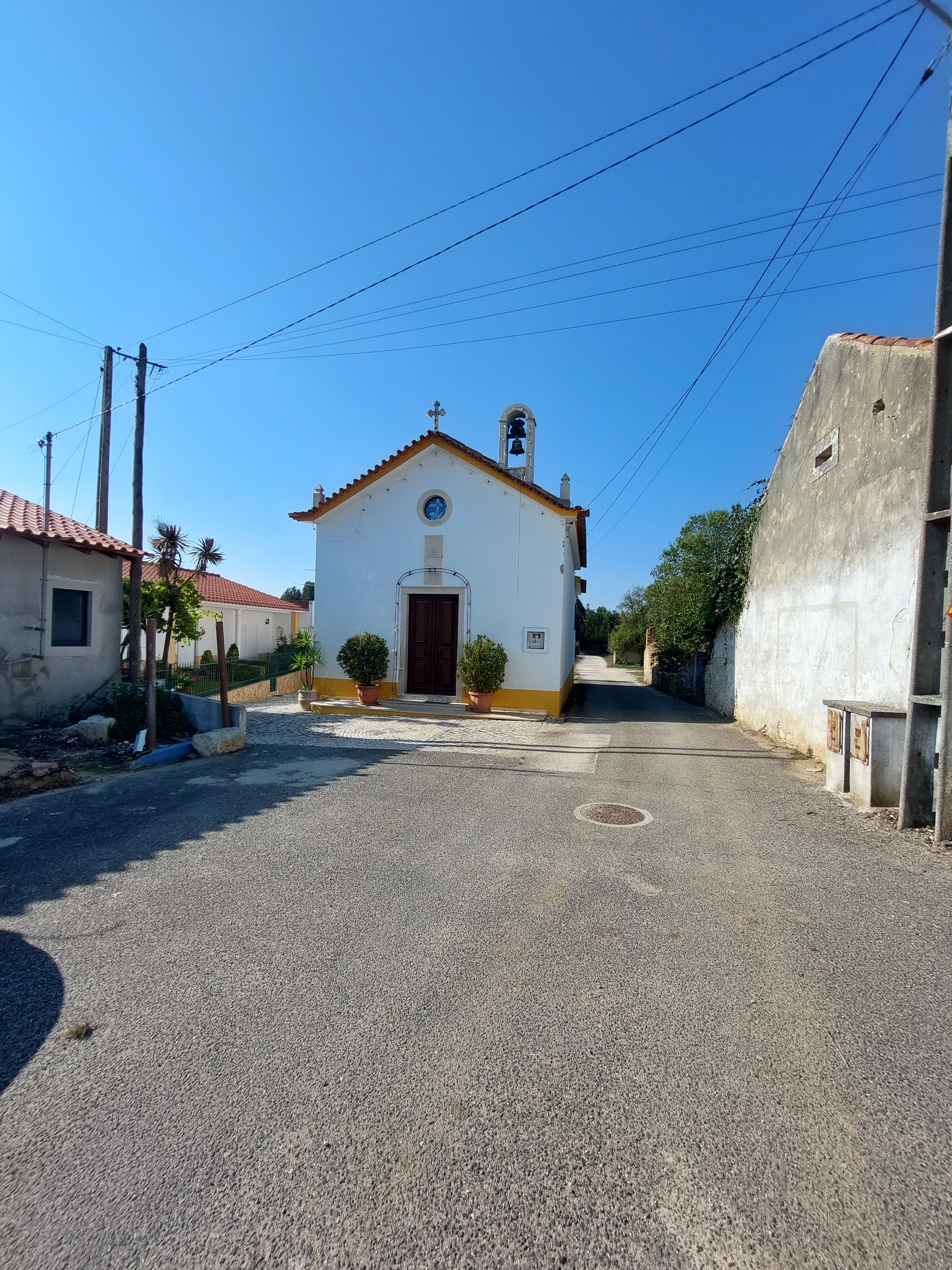
Capela de Nossa Senhora do Bom Sucesso

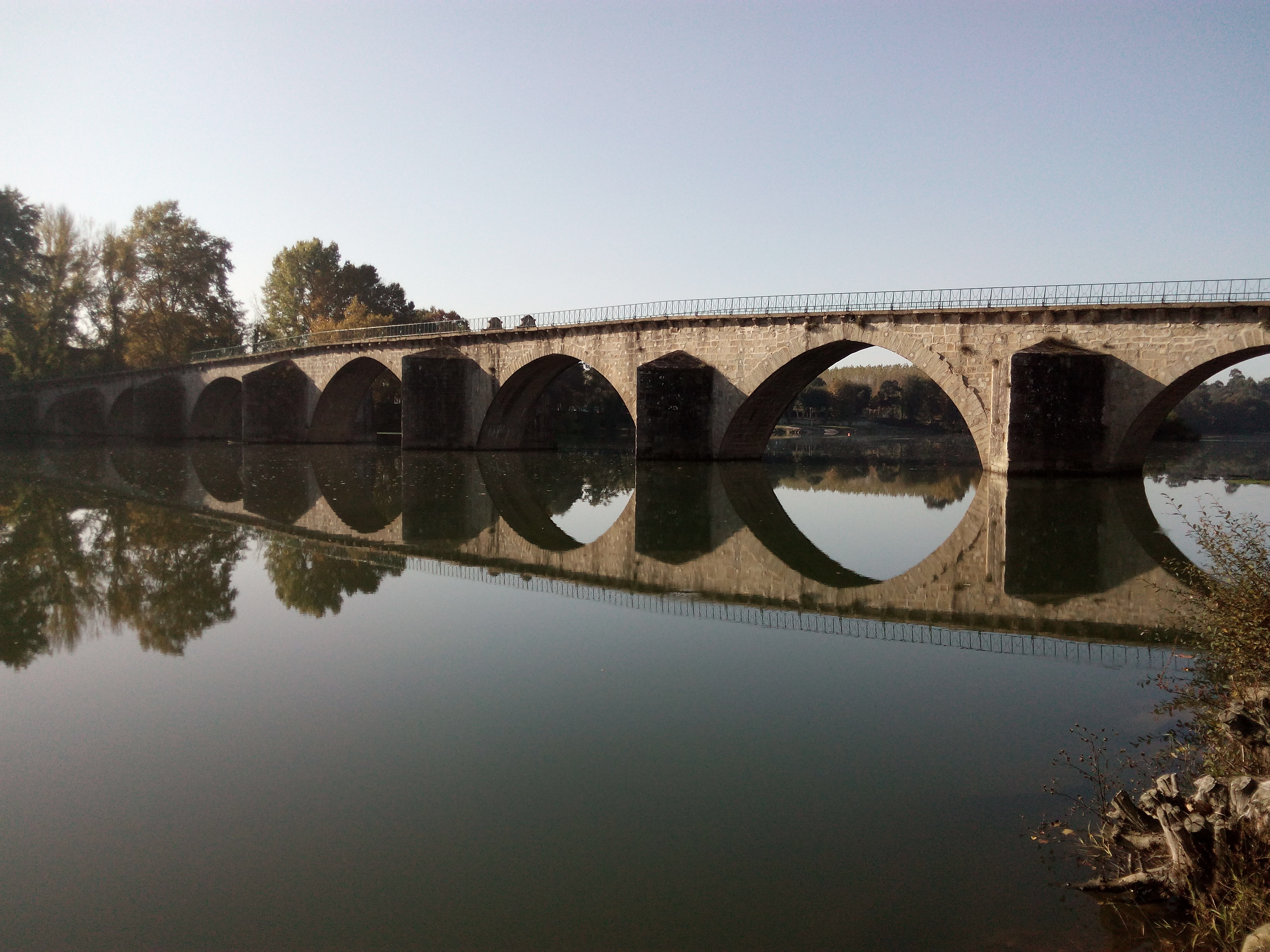
Ponte de Prado
