= Arrifana (Vila Nova de Poiares) =

- Civil parish
- Location in Portugal
- Coordinates: 40.232°N 8.278°W
- Country: Portugal
- Region: Centro
- Intermunic. comm.: Região de Coimbra
- District: Coimbra
- Municipality: Vila Nova de Poiares

Area
  - Total: 23.84 km^{2} (9.20 sq mi)

Population (2011)
  - Total: 1,440
  - Density: 60.4/km^{2} (156/sq mi)
- Time zone: UTC+00:00 (WET)
  - Summer (DST): UTC+01:00 (WEST)

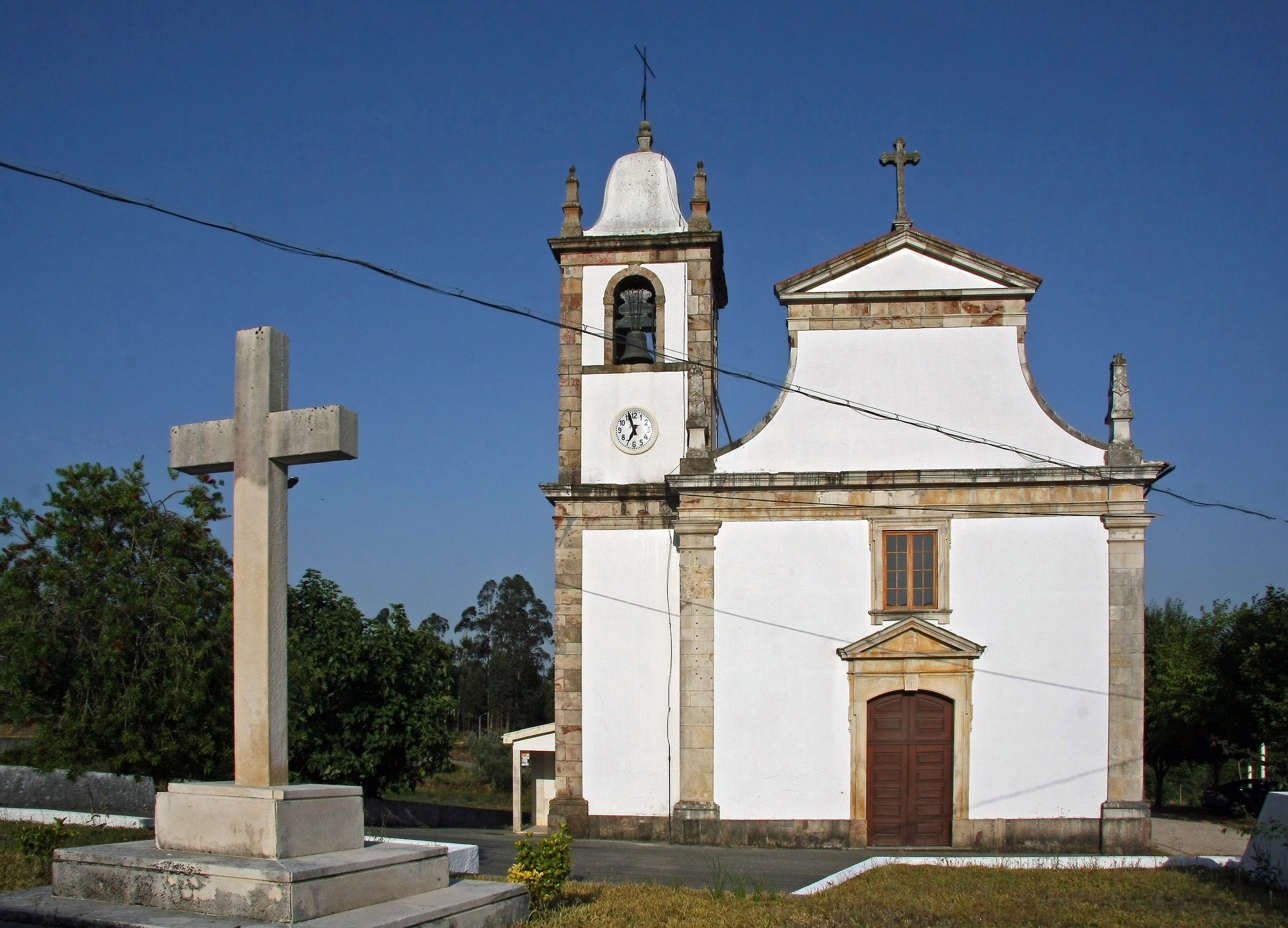

Arrifana (Portuguese pronunciation: [ɐʁiˈfɐnɐ]) is a civil parish in the municipality of Vila Nova de Poiares, Portugal. The population in 2011 was 1,440, in an area of 23.84 km².
