= Vilar do Paraíso =

Coordinates: 41.108°N 8.620°W

Location of Vilar do Paraíso in Vila Nova de Gaia.

Vilar do Paraíso is a former civil parish in the municipality of Vila Nova de Gaia, Portugal. In 2013, the parish merged into the new parish Mafamude e Vilar do Paraíso. The population in 2011 was 13,878, in an area of 5.30 km^{2}.

== Heritage ==
- Chapel of Saint Martin (Capela de São Martinho)
