= Ouca =

- Civil parish
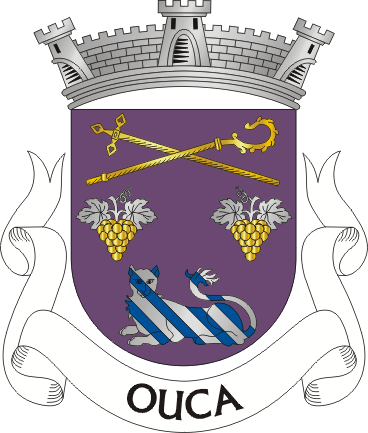
- Coat of arms

- Location in Portugal
- Coordinates: 40°30′44″N 8°38′53″W
- Country: Portugal
- Region: Centro
- Intermunic. comm.: Região de Aveiro
- District: Aveiro
- Municipality: Vagos

Area
  - Total: 16.29 km^{2} (6.29 sq mi)

Population (2011)
  - Total: 1,805
  - Density: 110/km^{2} (290/sq mi)
- Time zone: UTC+00:00 (WET)
  - Summer (DST): UTC+01:00 (WEST)
- Postal code: 3840-302

Ouca is a village and a civil parish of the municipality of Vagos, Portugal. The population in 2011 was 1,805, in an area of 16.29 km^{2}.
