= Zhaleh-ye Kuseh =

Zhaleh-ye Kuseh ژاله كوسه
- Village
- Country: Iran
- Province: Kermanshah
- County: Salas-e Babajani
- Bakhsh: Ozgoleh
- Rural District: Ozgoleh

Population (2006)
  - Total: 63
- Time zone: UTC+3:30 (IRST)
  - Summer (DST): UTC+4:30 (IRDT)

Zhaleh-ye Kuseh (Persian: ژاله كوسه, also Romanized as Zhāleh-ye Kūseh and Žāle-ye Kūse) is a village in Ozgoleh Rural District, Ozgoleh District, Salas-e Babajani County, Kermanshah Province, Iran. At the 2006 census, its population was 63, in 15 families.
