= Vila Nova de Poiares =

- Municipality
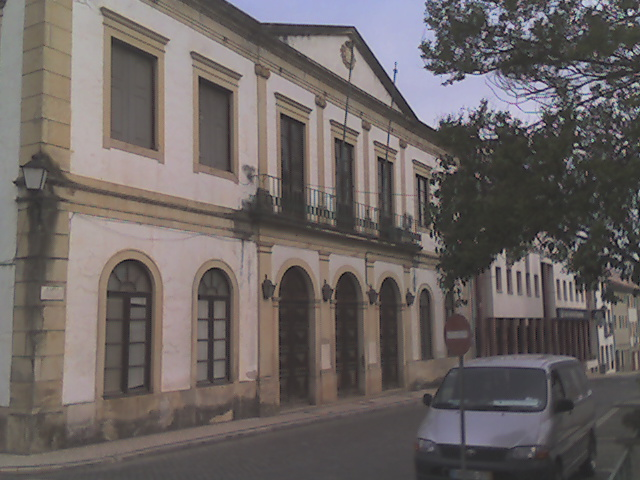
- City Hall of Vila Nova de Poiares

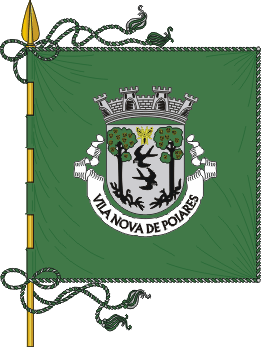
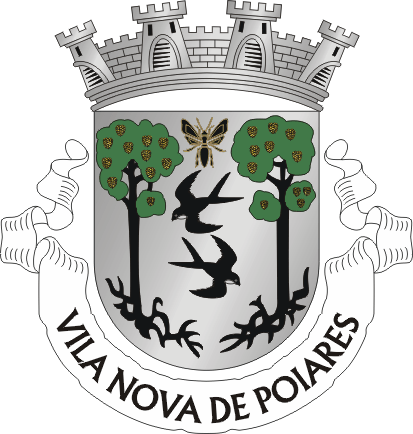
- Flag Coat of arms
- Interactive map of Vila Nova de Poiares
- Coordinates: 40°12′39″N 8°15′27″W
- Country: Portugal
- Region: Centro
- Intermunic. comm.: Região de Coimbra
- District: Coimbra
- Parishes: 4

Area
  - Total: 84.45 km^{2} (32.61 sq mi)

Population (2011)
  - Total: 7,281
  - Density: 86.22/km^{2} (223.3/sq mi)
- Time zone: UTC+00:00 (WET)
  - Summer (DST): UTC+01:00 (WEST)
- Website: web.archive.org/web/20141006090736/http://www.cm-vilanovadepoiares.pt/

Vila Nova de Poiares (Portuguese pronunciation: [ˈvilɐ ˈnɔvɐ ðɨ poˈjaɾɨʃ]) is a municipality in the Coimbra district, in Portugal. The population in 2011 was 7,281, in an area of 84.45 km². This place has rivers such as Alva, Ceira and Mondego. There are also mountains. Vila Nova de Poiares is also known as the "National Capital of Handicrafts and Gastronomy."

== Parishes ==
Administratively, the municipality is divided into 4 civil parishes (freguesias):

- Arrifana
- Lavegadas
- Santo André de Poiares
- São Miguel de Poiares

== International relations ==
Vila Nova de Poiares is twinned with:

- Mielec in Poland

Douchy-Les-Mines, France
