= Jail (disambiguation) =

A jail is a detention facility.

Jail may also refer to:

== Computing ==
- Chroot jail, the result of a chroot
- FreeBSD jail, a system-level virtualization mechanism
- In operating system-level virtualization, any virtual user-space instance

== Entertainment ==
- Jail (2009 film), a Bollywood prison drama
- Jail (2018 film), Nigerian
- Jail (2021 film), an Indian action film
- Jail (Big Mama Thornton album), 1975
- Jail (TV series), an American reality show
- Jail (Monopoly), a feature of the board game
- "Jail" (song), on the 2021 album Donda by Kanye West
- "Jail", a 1995 song by Down from the album NOLA
