= Fernando Gomide =

Fernando Gomide is an electrical engineer at the State University of Campinas in São Paulo, Brazil. Gomide was named a Fellow of the Institute of Electrical and Electronics Engineers (IEEE) in 2016 for his contributions to fuzzy systems.
