= Seixezelo =

Coordinates: 41.033°N 8.551°W

Location of Seixezelo in Vila Nova de Gaia.

Seixezelo is a former civil parish in the municipality of Vila Nova de Gaia, Portugal. In 2013, the parish merged into the new parish Pedroso e Seixezelo. The population in 2011 was 1,712, in an area of 1.45 km².
