= Louro =

Louro is a Portuguese surname. Notable people with the surname include:

- Evan Louro (born 1996), American soccer player
- Fernando Louro (cyclist) (born 1962), Brazilian cyclist
- Maria Lucília Estanco Louro (1922–2018), Portuguese political activist
- Silvino Louro (1959–2026), Portuguese footballer
