= Modivas =

- Civil parish
- Location in Portugal
- Coordinates: 41.295°N 8.691°W
- Country: Portugal
- Region: Norte
- Metropolitan area: Porto
- District: Porto
- Municipality: Vila do Conde

Area
  - Total: 4.10 km^{2} (1.58 sq mi)

Population (2011)
  - Total: 1,806
  - Density: 440/km^{2} (1,140/sq mi)
- Time zone: UTC+00:00 (WET)
  - Summer (DST): UTC+01:00 (WEST)

Modivas is a civil parish in the municipality of Vila do Conde, Portugal. The population in 2011 was 1,806, in an area of 4.10 km².
