= Fajozes =

- Civil parish
- Location in Portugal
- Coordinates: 41.324°N 8.696°W
- Country: Portugal
- Region: Norte
- Metropolitan area: Porto
- District: Porto
- Municipality: Vila do Conde

Area
  - Total: 5.96 km^{2} (2.30 sq mi)

Population (2011)
  - Total: 1,425
  - Density: 240/km^{2} (620/sq mi)
- Time zone: UTC+00:00 (WET)
  - Summer (DST): UTC+01:00 (WEST)

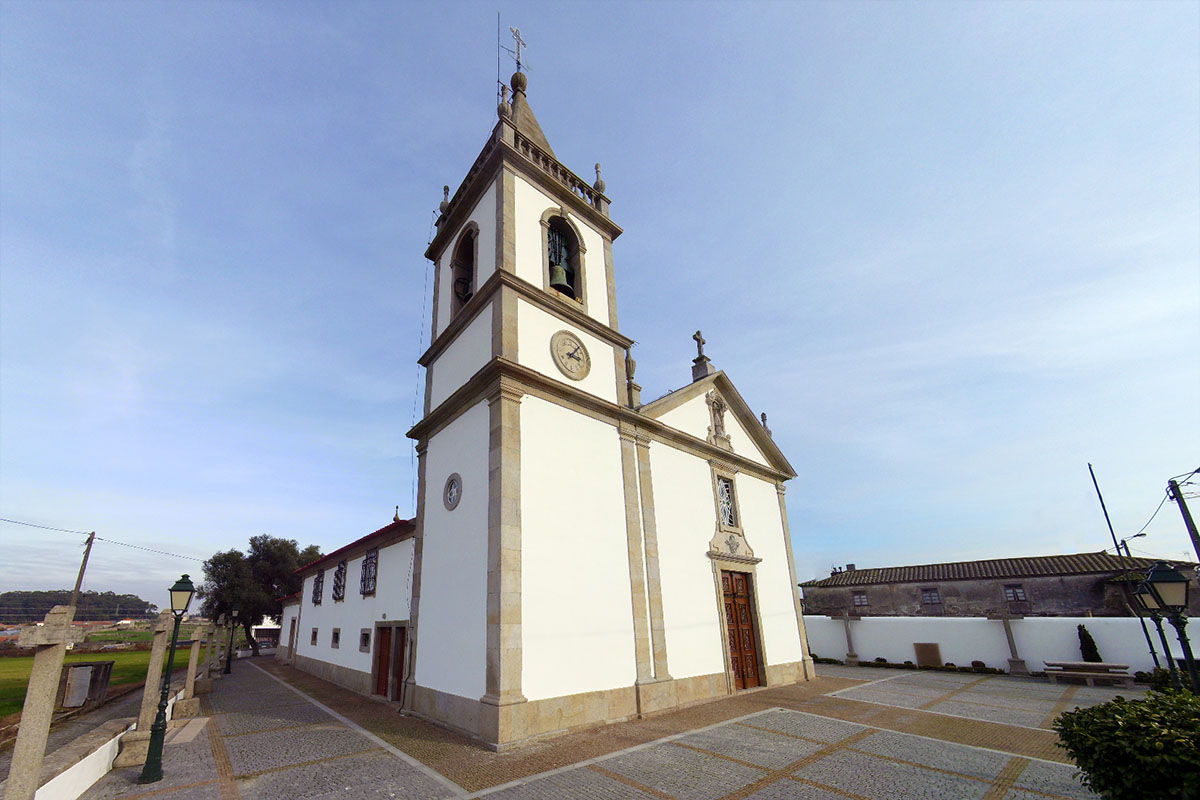
Church in Fajozes

Fajozes is a civil parish in the municipality of Vila do Conde, Portugal. The population in 2011 was 1,425, in an area of 5.96 km².
