= Vila Chã (Vila do Conde) =

- Civil parish
- Location in Portugal
- Coordinates: 41.294°N 8.723°W
- Country: Portugal
- Region: Norte
- Metropolitan area: Porto
- District: Porto
- Municipality: Vila do Conde

Area
  - Total: 4.81 km^{2} (1.86 sq mi)

Population (2011)
  - Total: 3,094
  - Density: 640/km^{2} (1,700/sq mi)
- Time zone: UTC+00:00 (WET)
  - Summer (DST): UTC+01:00 (WEST)
- Website: www.jfvilacha.pt

Vila Chã is a civil parish in the municipality of Vila do Conde, Portugal. The population in 2011 was 3,094, in an area of 4.81 km^{2}.
