= Árvore, Portugal =

Árvore
- Civil parish
- Location in Portugal
- Coordinates: 41.337°N 8.718°W
- Country: Portugal
- Region: Norte
- Metropolitan area: Porto
- District: Porto
- Municipality: Vila do Conde

Area
  - Total: 6.56 km^{2} (2.53 sq mi)

Population (2021)
  - Total: 5,562
  - Density: 850/km^{2} (2,200/sq mi)
- Time zone: UTC+00:00 (WET)
  - Summer (DST): UTC+01:00 (WEST)

Árvore is a civil parish in the municipality of Vila do Conde, Portugal. The population in 2021 is 5,562, according to the census. The civil parish has an area of 6.56 km^{2}.
