= Vila do Conde =

- Municipality
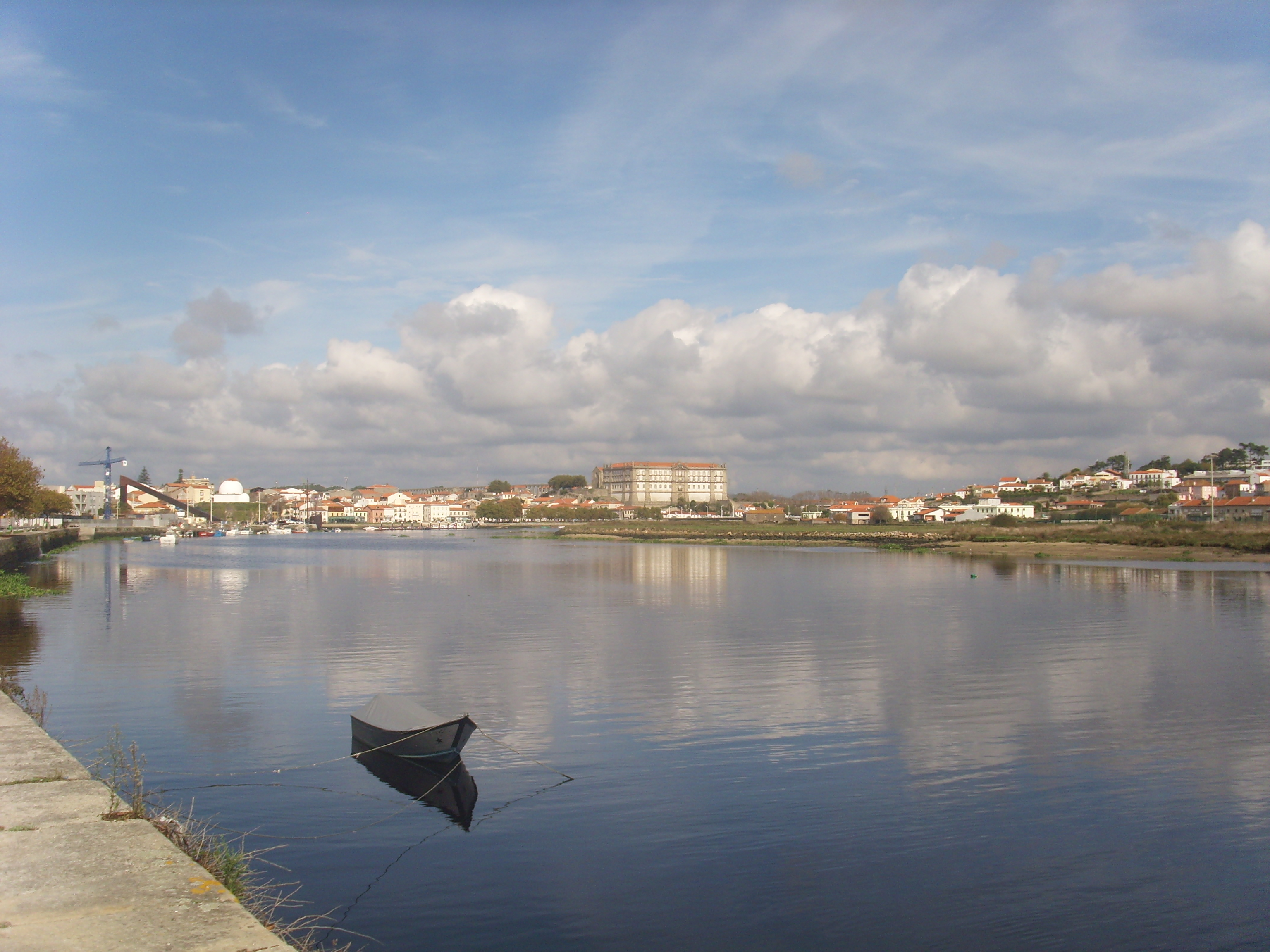
- The town of Vila do Conde on the River Ave

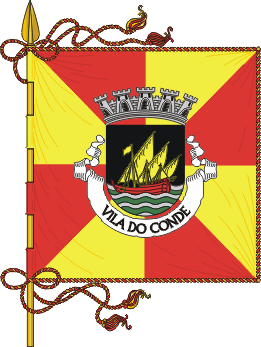
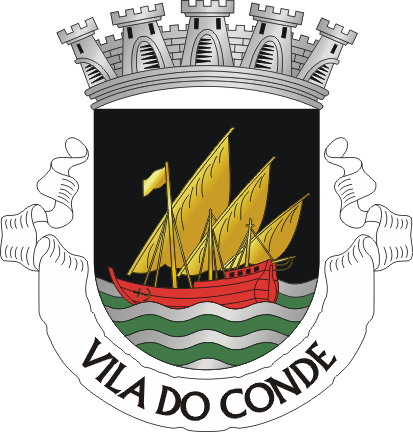
- Flag Coat of arms
- Interactive map of Vila do Conde
- Coordinates: 41°21′10″N 8°44′40″W
- Country: Portugal
- Region: Norte
- Metropolitan area: Porto
- District: Porto
- Parishes: 21

Government
  - President: Vítor Costa (PS)

Area
  - Total: 149.03 km^{2} (57.54 sq mi)
- Elevation: 49 m (161 ft)
- Lowest elevation: 0 m (0 ft)

Population (2025)
  - Total: 86,245
  - Density: 578.71/km^{2} (1,498.8/sq mi)
- Time zone: UTC+00:00 (WET)
  - Summer (DST): UTC+01:00 (WEST)
- Postal code: 4480
- Area code: 252
- Patron: São João Baptista
- Website: viladoconde.com/en/

Vila do Conde (pronounced [ˈvilɐ ðu ˈkõdɨ], locally [ˈbilɐ ðu ˈkoŋdɨ]; "the Count's Town") is a municipality in the Norte Region of Portugal. The population in 2025 was estimated at 86,245. The urbanized area of Vila do Conde, which includes the parishes of Vila do Conde, Azurara and Árvore, represent 36,137 inhabitants. Vila do Conde is interlinked to the north with Póvoa de Varzim, forming a single urban agglomeration which is a part of the Porto Metropolitan Area. The town is on the Portuguese Way of the Camino de Santiago.

== History ==
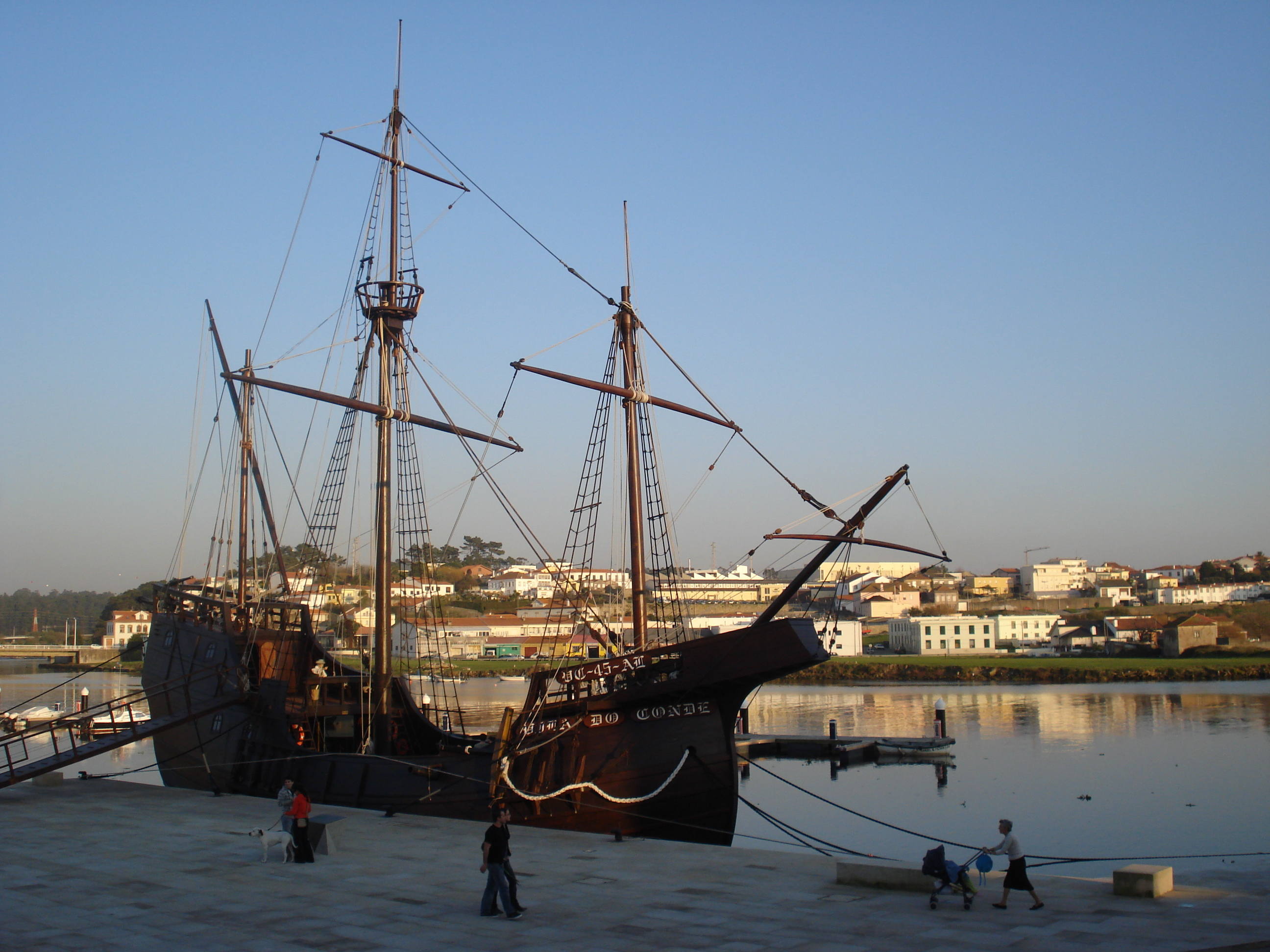
A carrack in the harbour of Vila do Conde: many mariners from the village were involved in the epic voyages during the Age of Discovery

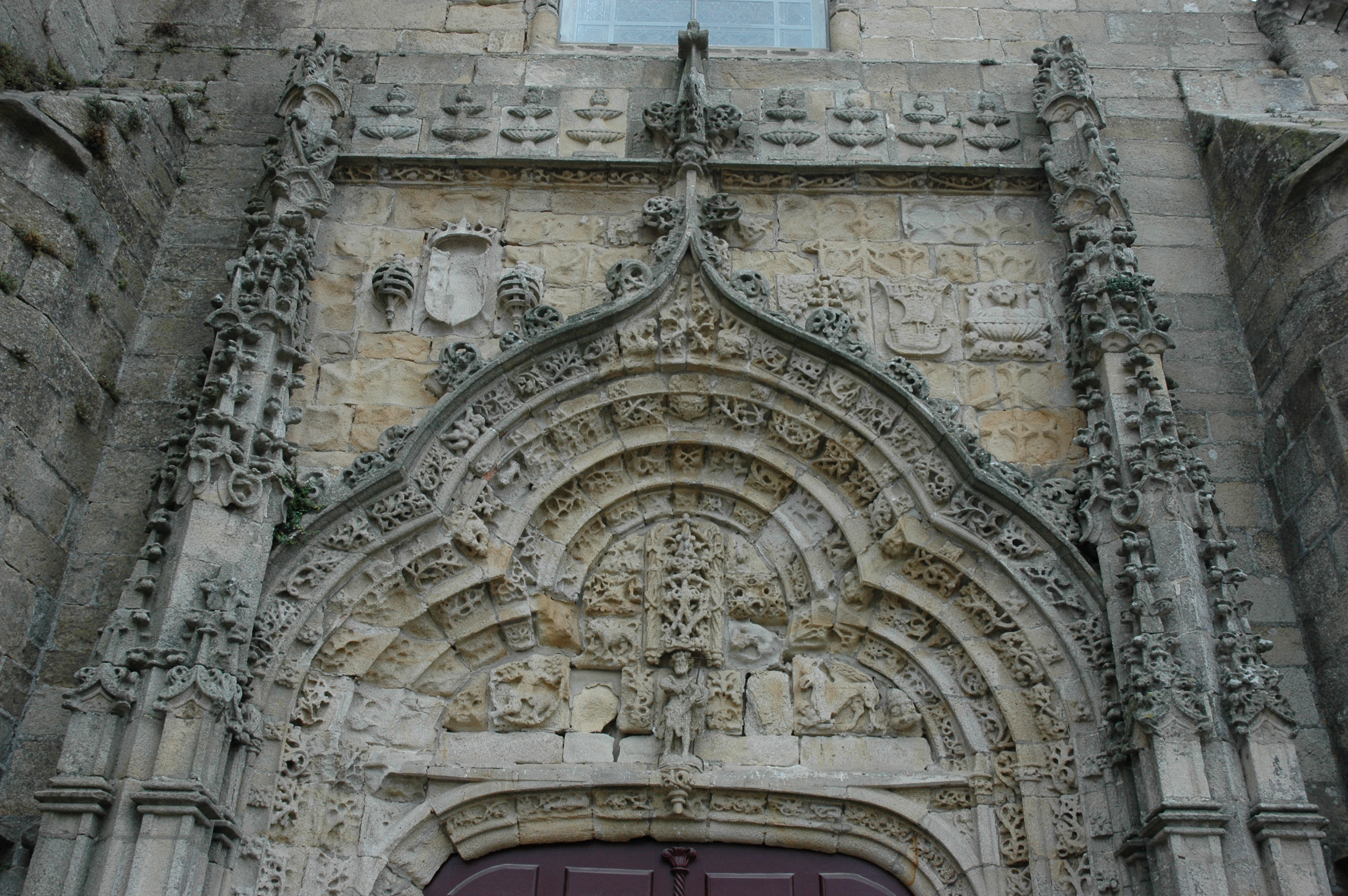
The Manueline-style church portico in the Matrice Church along Rua da Igreja, constructed from the wealth of Portuguese discoveries

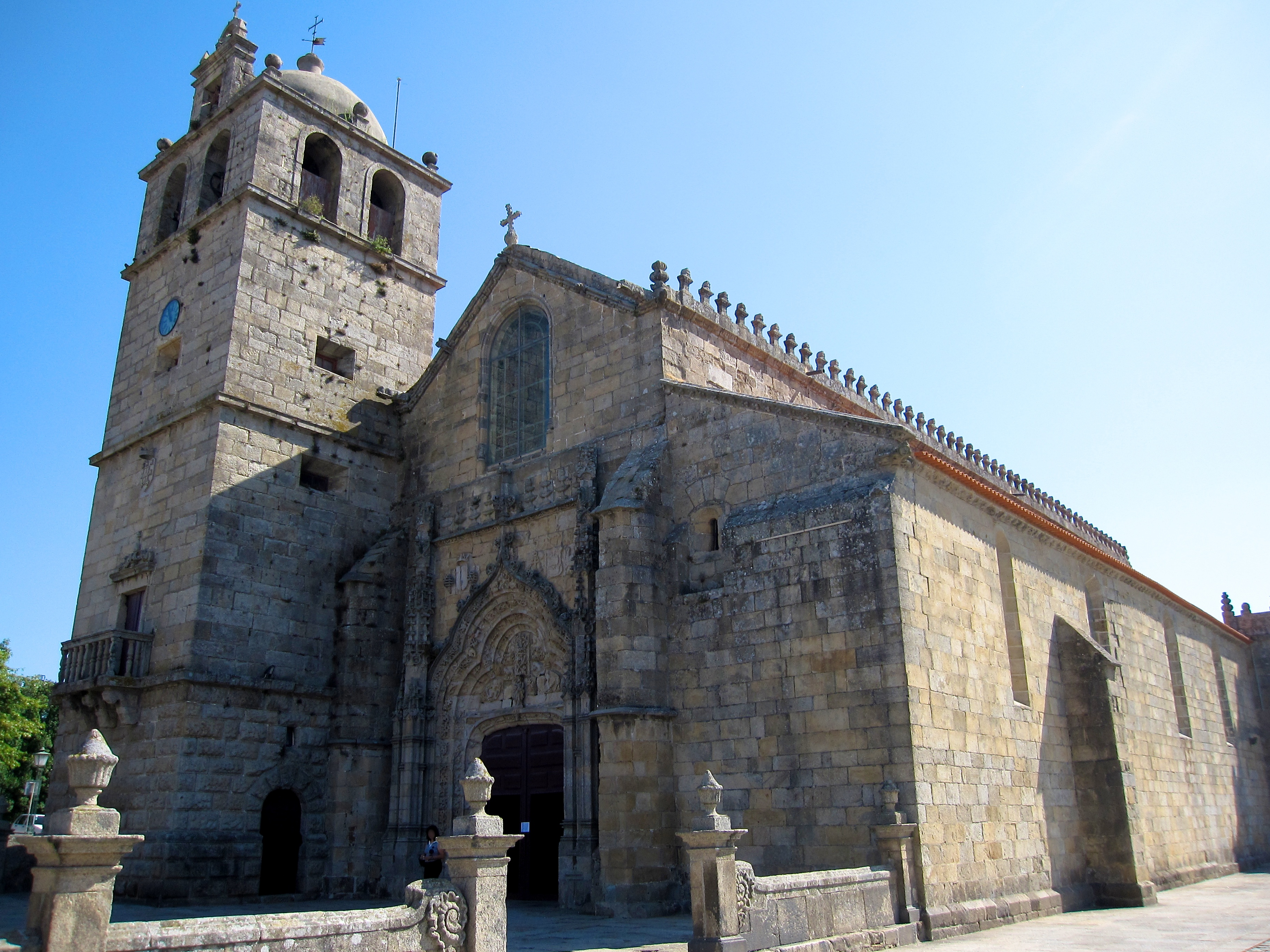
Matrice Church

Vila do Conde is one of the oldest settlements in northern Portugal. Geological artifacts dating to the Paleolithic have been discovered in sites in the parishes of Modivas, Malta, and Labruge dating from 100,000 to 15,000 years. In other parishes there have also been discoveries of implements and mounds dating back to the Bronze Age and Neolithic periods indicating a period of transition between foraging and sedimentary civilizations.

Its origins date back to the founding of the Portuguese territory; the earliest written document (953), by the Countess Mumadona Dias, refers to the Villa de Comite, in a chart used for the sale of land by Flamula Pelagius, to the Monastery of Guimarães. But its ancient origins date back to the Castro of São João (Hillfort of St. John), and other Iron Age castros, that include dispersed settlements in Retorta, Bagunte, Ferreiró, Vairão and Labruge. In the 18th century, Jerónimo Contador de Argote, citing references to the castro culture, identified the existence of one of these structures in the hilltops of Cividade de Bagunte, a structure occupying 50 hectares (0.50 km^{2}). Other castros within the municipality have been mostly agricultural, and some discoveries of ceramics have occurred, although most have been found in ruins. Similar vestiges of the Roman occupation of the region continue to be discovered, and archaeological digs are ongoing in a dozen sites throughout the municipality.

The origin of the toponym is unknown. Most authors point to the 9th century counts of the Reconquista, those who came from Galicia and Asturias and were ancestors of the aforementioned Flamula, as probably linked to the genesis of the name.

Later, King Dinis of Portugal bestowed on Maria Paes da Ribeira these seigneurial holdings (Dinis had long had many illegitimate children with the noblewoman).

In 1318, Afonso Sanches (the illegitimate son of King Dinis of Portugal and Aldonça Rodrigues Telha) and Teresa Martins (daughter of João Afonso de Menez, Count of Barcelos, granddaughter of Sancho IV of Castile) and great-great-granddaughter of Maria Pais da Ribeira, founded the Monastery of Santa Clara. Later referred to as the Convent of Santa Clara, the construction of the monastery developed from the bad relationship between King Dinis and his wife, Queen Elizabeth of Portugal, due to the king's preference for his illegitimate son. The queen re-founded, in 1314, an abandoned monastery in Coimbra, which she renamed Santa Clara. This prompted King Dinis to sponsor and authorize Afonso Sanches to build a monastery of the same invocation on the right bank of the Ave river, where an ancient Celtic hillfort was located. The cornerstone was laid in 1318, and once completed it was deposited in the hands of the Franciscan Order, which he patronized throughout his life, eventually leaving Vila do Conde, its lands and rents, in their possession after his and his wife's deaths. Today it is the ex-libris of Vila do Conde. The priory became the judicial seat, with all the royal rights in the area. Yet, King Edward began to contest these grand privileges during his reign, and King John III of Portugal finally stripped them of those rights in 1537, investing his brother Edward, with the seigneurial titles. At the marriage of Catherine, his daughter, with John I, 6th Duke of Braganza, the Infante Edward passed on the title to the Royal House of Braganza. Consequently, Vila do Conde had representation in the Royal Cortes and their alcaldes were nominated for dukedoms in the Royal House of Braganza. But this was also responsible for the local government weakness and high taxes on most local economic activities, except shipping and trade, where the national government had sole control.

During the 16th century, attained the apex of its commercial and maritime importance due to naval construction, associated with the Portuguese Age of Discovery. Many of the historical buildings, such as the port and customshouse, were all integral in the commercial relief of the 16th century. The passage of King Manuel through Vila do Conde, during a pilgrimage to Santiago de Compostela, in 1502, helped to develop some of the important infrastructures in the city: the Matrice Church, Praça Nova and municipal buildings, along with new arterials, were begun under the reign of Manuel I. The Praça Nova (Portuguese: New Square), today Praça Vasco da Gama was opened in 1538, during the reign of King John III of Portugal, and where the municipal buildings were located.

Manuel I conceded a foral (royal charter) in 1516, due to the active and integral participation of its population during the exploration of the new lands in India. Of these mariners of note, were the brothers Paulo and Francisco Faria, who were on Vasco da Gama's expeditionary voyage.

During the 19th century, French troops were responsible for the destruction and pillaging of many of the infrastructures and deaths. By the middle of the 19th century, the town had one ecclesiastical parish, dedicated to Saint John the Baptist, founded by Manuel I of Portugal, and erected by the archbishop of Braga, Diogo de Sousa in 1518. In addition, the community included the Church of the Misericordia, hospital, six chapels, municipal building, customhouse, the Convent of Santa Clara (now remodelled and expanded since its construction), and the Convent of Nossa Senhora da Encarnação. In addition, the secular buildings included a small theatre, a recreational assembly and ornate dock of rock on the right margin of the Ave River towards its mouth, and across from the Chapel of Nossa Senhora da Guia.

In 1987, the urbanized area was elevated to the status of city.

== Geography ==
Vila do Conde is located in the north-west coast of Portugal, surrounded by the municipalities of Vila Nova de Famalicão Municipality (east), Maia (southeast), Trofa (southeast), Matosinhos (south) and Póvoa de Varzim (north). Fronting the Atlantic Ocean and the Ave River (to its south), the municipality includes 18 kilometres (11 miles) of beaches, in addition to extensive rural areas with fields and estates. Located 20 km (12 mi) from Porto, access to the municipality is completed through many of its transport networks: the A28 (linking Porto to Viana do Castelo), the EN13, a Metro line and the A11 roadway.

The area of Vila do Conde is part of the granite-metamorphic basement, the Iberian Hercynian massif, that extends from the Spanish border to Espinho (15 km (9 mi) south of Porto). Over the Hercynian bedrock there is a prevalence of sandy beaches, and in other areas, the erosion of these sands has allowed the exposure of the rocky substrata. Most of the rock outcrops (never more than 20 metres) disappear north of the Ave River. Yet, these deposits are irregular, and most comparable sediments are not necessarily found at the same altitude. There are also deformations associated with the last inter-glacial period, that have affected these sedimentary layers, most commonly in the beach of Sampaio, where deposits have been discovered between various altitudes (5 and 9 metres).

== Administration ==
The municipality is subdivided into the following local government civil parishes, of which Azurara, Árvore and Vila do Conde form the urbanized city of Vila do Conde:

- Árvore
- Aveleda
- Azurara
- Bagunte, Ferreiró, Outeiro Maior e Parada
- Fajozes
- Fornelo e Vairão
- Gião
- Guilhabreu
- Junqueira
- Labruge
- Macieira da Maia
- Malta e Canidelo
- Mindelo
- Modivas
- Retorta e Tougues
- Rio Mau e Arcos
- Touguinha e Touguinhó
- Vila Chã
- Vila do Conde
- Vilar e Mosteiró
- Vilar de Pinheiro

== Demographics ==
Historical population

Year	Pop.	±%
1864	21,907	—
1878	23,478	+7.2%
1890	25,838	+10.1%
1900	27,366	+5.9%
1911	31,135	+13.8%
1920	33,335	+7.1%
1930	34,116	+2.3%
1940	39,827	+16.7%
1950	44,460	+11.6%

Year	Pop.	±%
1960	48,806	+9.8%
1970	53,570	+9.8%
1981	64,402	+20.2%
1991	64,836	+0.7%
2001	74,391	+14.7%
2011	79,533	+6.9%
2021	80,825	+1.6%
2025	86,245	+6.7%

Source: INE

== Economy ==
The municipal authorities have promoted a future-looking environment in Vila do Conde, that have concentrated on the tourist market, involving the requalification of many of the historical buildings (such as the Convent and customshouse), in addition to promoting an ocean-centric tourist economy associated with the Programa Polis initiative.

The communities along the coast, which include the main beaches and bird sanctuary, are essentially beach resorts with a high technology industrial park in Mindelo with some semi-conductor industries.

=== Transport ===
Vila do Conde is serviced by an ample network of terrestrial, aerial and maritime transport links. The road networks include accesses to the national auto-estradas (English: motorways/highways), and inter-municipal roadways, along a north–south axis from Vila Nova de Cerveira until Porto via the A28 Auto-estrada. The A7 crosses the A28 along an east-to-west intersection, along the north of the city, linking Vila Nova de Famalicão to Guimarães.

The national roadways that cross the municipal borders as managed by the municipality, including the EN13, which crosses the municipality and city along a north-to-south axis, linking into the northern agglomeration of Póvoa de Varzim. In the north, the EN205 intersects the municipality along an east to west trajectory from Vila do Conde to Vila Nova de Famalicão. Similarly, the EN104 crosses the municipality in the centre, along a similar orientation (east to west), and connects Vila do Conde with Trofa and Santo Tirso. The ancillary EN205 and EN104 are primarily used by motorists within the municipality and interlink the many civil parishes. Municipal public transport is primarily operated by Litoral Norte - Transportes Urbanos da Póvoa de Varzim, although the remains lines are managed byTransdev. The B Line of the Porto Metro system connects Vila do Conde with Porto and the airport, providing both normal and express services, in addition to northern connections to Póvoa de Varzim. The line also operated an older rail-line that connected Porto and Póvoa de Varzim, with intermediary stops in Vila do Conde, but was discontinued in 2002 in favour of Metro services.

Situated 15 km (9 mi) from the centre of Vila do Conde, the Porto-Francisco de Sá Carneiro International Airport (OPO), the second largest international airport in the country is linked to Vila do Conde across the A28, EN13 and Porto Metro.

== Architecture ==
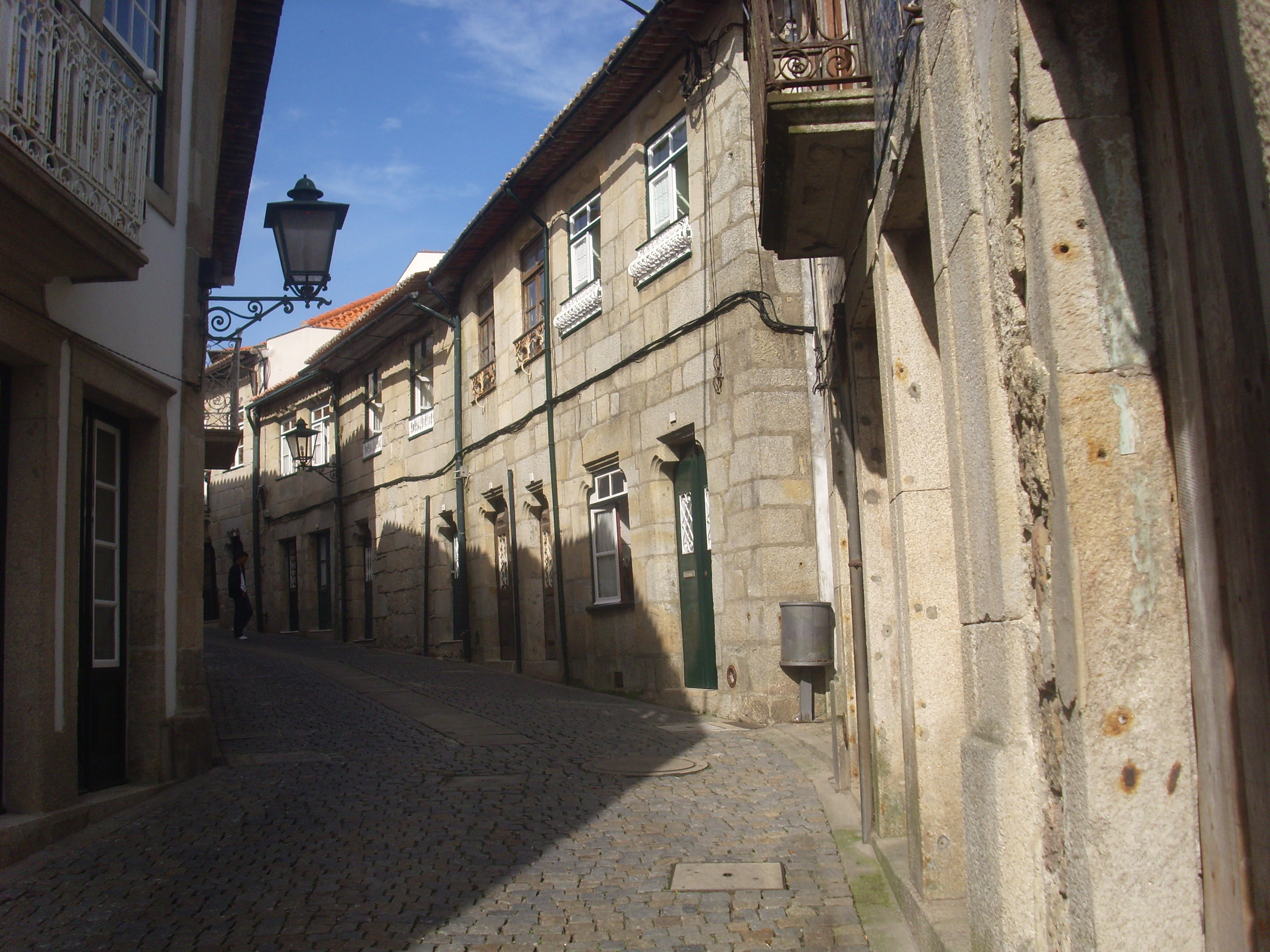
The well-preserved Rua da Igreja, dating back to the 16th century

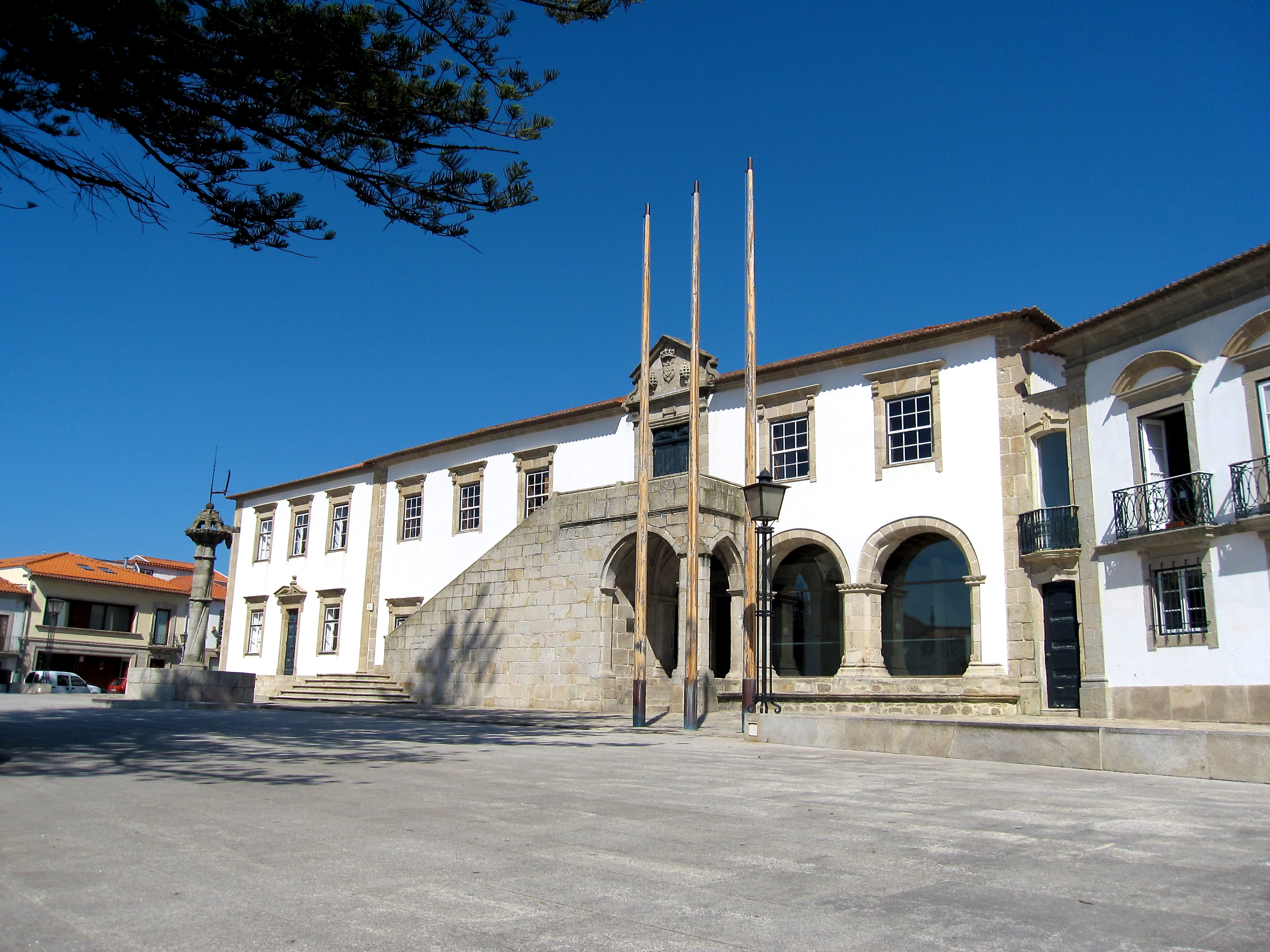
Town hall

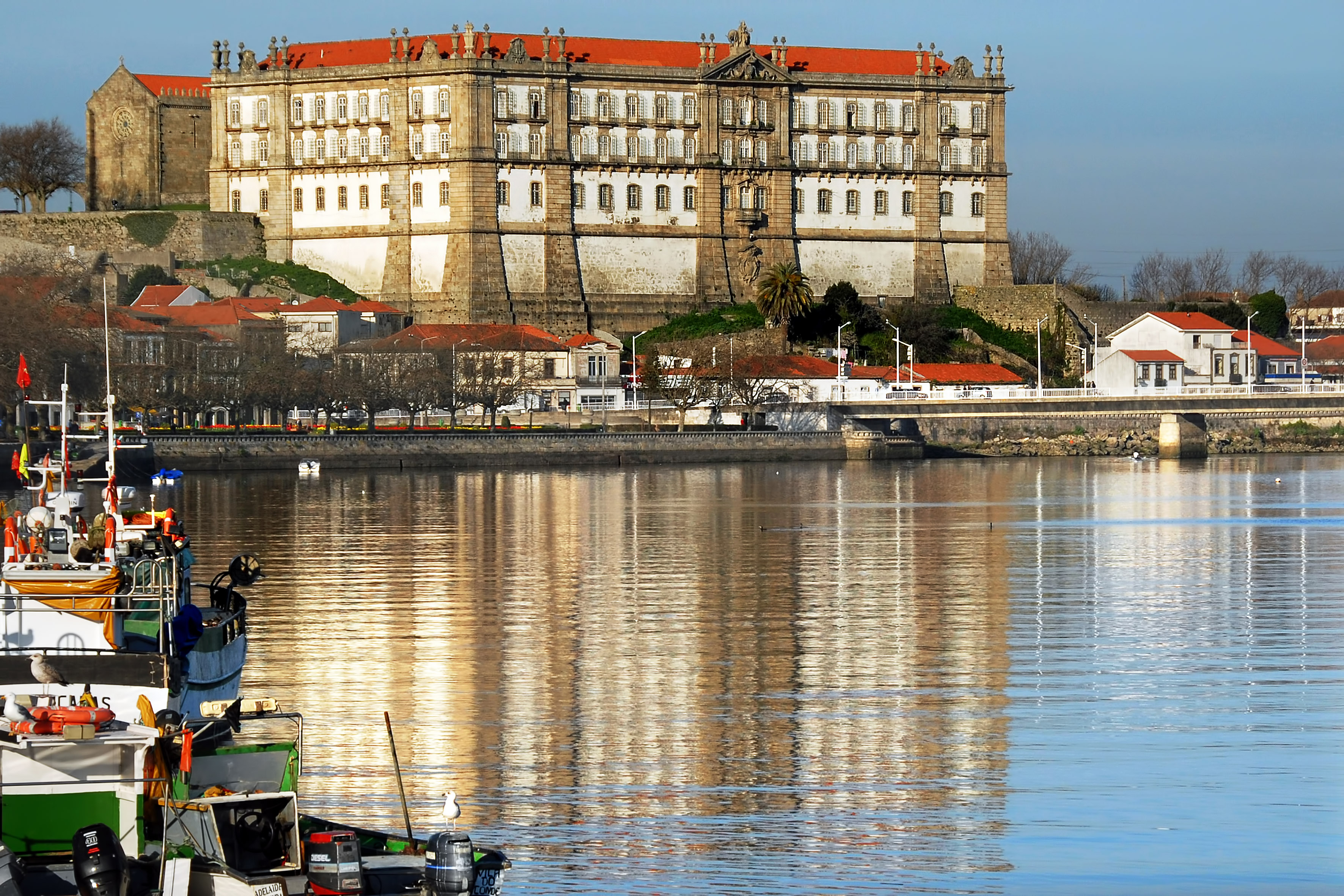
Santa Clara Convent

=== Civic ===
- Aqueduct of Vila do Conde (Portuguese: Aqueduto de Vila do Conde) - initially constructed between 1705 and 1714, it had 999 arches and ran for four kilometres; the aqueduct is the second longest in Portugal, connecting a spring in Terroso, Póvoa de Varzim, with a fountain in the monastery of Santa Clara.
- Municipal Hall of Vila do Conde (Portuguese: Paços do Concelho) - located in the Praça Nova (or Praça Vasco da Gama) square, date back to 1543 (supposedly the date of completion), it is located in front of the municipal marker (Portuguese: pelourinho), and is one of the more important urban interventions in Vila do Conde since the 16th century. The executive office block and the Salão Nobre (English: Noble Hall), in particular, are the centrepieces of the building, with an ornate portrait of Queen Maria II of Portugal surmounted by royal coat of arms.
- Mill of Azurara (Portuguese: Azenha de Azurara) - a rectangular building, with the coat of arms in sculpted rock of the Marquess of Vila Real (who in the 16th century ordered its construction).

=== Military ===
- Fort of Saint John the Baptist (Portuguese: Forte de São João Baptista) - the fort is located at the mouth of the Ave River.

=== Religious ===
- Chapel of Our Lady of Help (Portuguese: Capela de Nossa Senhora do Socorro), the chapel is implanted on a rocky escarpment over the Ave River, on the Rua do Socorro; the chapel is atypical of Portuguese architecture: it has a square plan and large rounded dome. Yet, in the interior, the chapel exemplifies 18th-century architecture, with azulejos showing the life of Christ, and a Rococo-style altar. It was ordered built by Gaspar Manuel, knight of the Order of Christ and chief-pilot in service to the King during voyages to India, China and Japan, and his wife Bárbara Ferreira de Almeida; both were buried there on their deaths.
- Chapel of Our Lady of Guidance (Portuguese: Capela da Nossa Senhora da Guia), the chapel dates back to the 10th–11th century; located at the end of Avenida Marquês Sá da Bandeira (Vila do Conde), the chapel is referenced in a 1059 inventory of the Monastery of Guimarães, but designated as the Hermitage of Saint Julian the Martyr. It is an irregular building, with an interior of azulejo from the 17th–18th century, and a roof decorated with scenes from the Bible and figures of saints.
- Church of Saint John the Baptist (Portuguese: Igreja de São João Baptista) - also referred to as the Matrice Church of Vila do Conde, located along the Rua da Igreja, the building is a late Gothic structure with elements of Manueline, Baroque and Neo-Gothic styles, represented by a Latin cross of three naves, transept (with two chapels). Its construction in the 16th century was initiated by King Manuel of Portugal's visit in 1502, who defined the plan, provided a substantial budget and imposed a tax to support the project. The architecture is marked by a large portico (by João de Castilho), a rectangular bell tower (erected in 1573 (designed by João Lopes the Elder), while the interior is richly decorated, with ornate pulpits and chapels;
- Church of Mercy, and Casa do Despacho - initiated in 1559, the plan of the Assembleia da Irmandade was to construct a church with a bell tower similar to the Misericórdia Church in Porto and having a pulpit comparable to that of the Church of Santo Eloy, similarly in Porto. The church has one nave whose interior is decorated in azulejo, while the roof is supported by wooden beam. The ancillary Casa do Despacho is notable for its window in the Manueline-style.
- Church of Azurara (Portuguese: Igreja Matriz de Azurara) – located between Rua Padre Serafim das Neves and Rua Nossa Senhora de Fátima, the church was constructed in the 16th century, with large naves (three), rectangular chapel and bell tower. The Manueline portico is built in sculpted rock, with rosettas and with a central coat of arms of King Manuel I. The interior, with its azulejos and gold-leaf altar/sacristy and 17th-century paintings, bely its stark exterior.
- Roman Church of Saint Christopher of Rio Mau (Portuguese: Igreja de São Cristóvão de Rio Mau), the church is a simple Roman church in a stark Romanesque-style single rectangular body, surmounted by a Templar Cross.
- Monastery of Saint Clare (Portuguese: Mosteiro de Santa Clara), also referred to as the Convent of Santa Clara, although founded in 1318 by Afonso Sanches and Teresa Martins, is an 18th-century refurbishment, since by the middle of the 17th century the building was in ruins and conditions did not allow the nuns to properly use the building. The remodelling of the building was discontinued after events in the 19th century and the abolition of monastic orders. Between 1936 and 1940, the DGEMN - Direcção Geral dos Edifícios e Monumentos Nacionais (English: General Directorate for Buildings and National Monuments) intervened to protect the building, the ex-libris of Vila do Conde.

- Church of the Convent of Santa Clara (Portuguese: Igreja do Convento de Santa Clara) (and the Founders Tombs), located in the Largo D. Afonso Sanches (Vila do Conde), is a monument constructed in 1318, with traces of Gothic, Manueline, Baroque and Rococo architectural styles. The church is based in a unique nave and transept of large dimensions, with the interior marked by richly decorated woodwork. The Chapel of the Founders (Portuguese: Capela dos Fundadores) houses the Manueline and Rococo tombs of historical nobility. The chorus is marked by two aisles of seating and paintings, while the high altar is embossed with gold-leaf.

In addition, in the interior (18 km (11 mi) from the beaches) are several examples of prehistoric and Roman structures such as the Castro de São Paio, or the Roman civitas Bagunte, in addition to homes and estates of rural gentry, or monastic settlements, such as in Junqueira, Azurara or Vairão.

== Culture ==
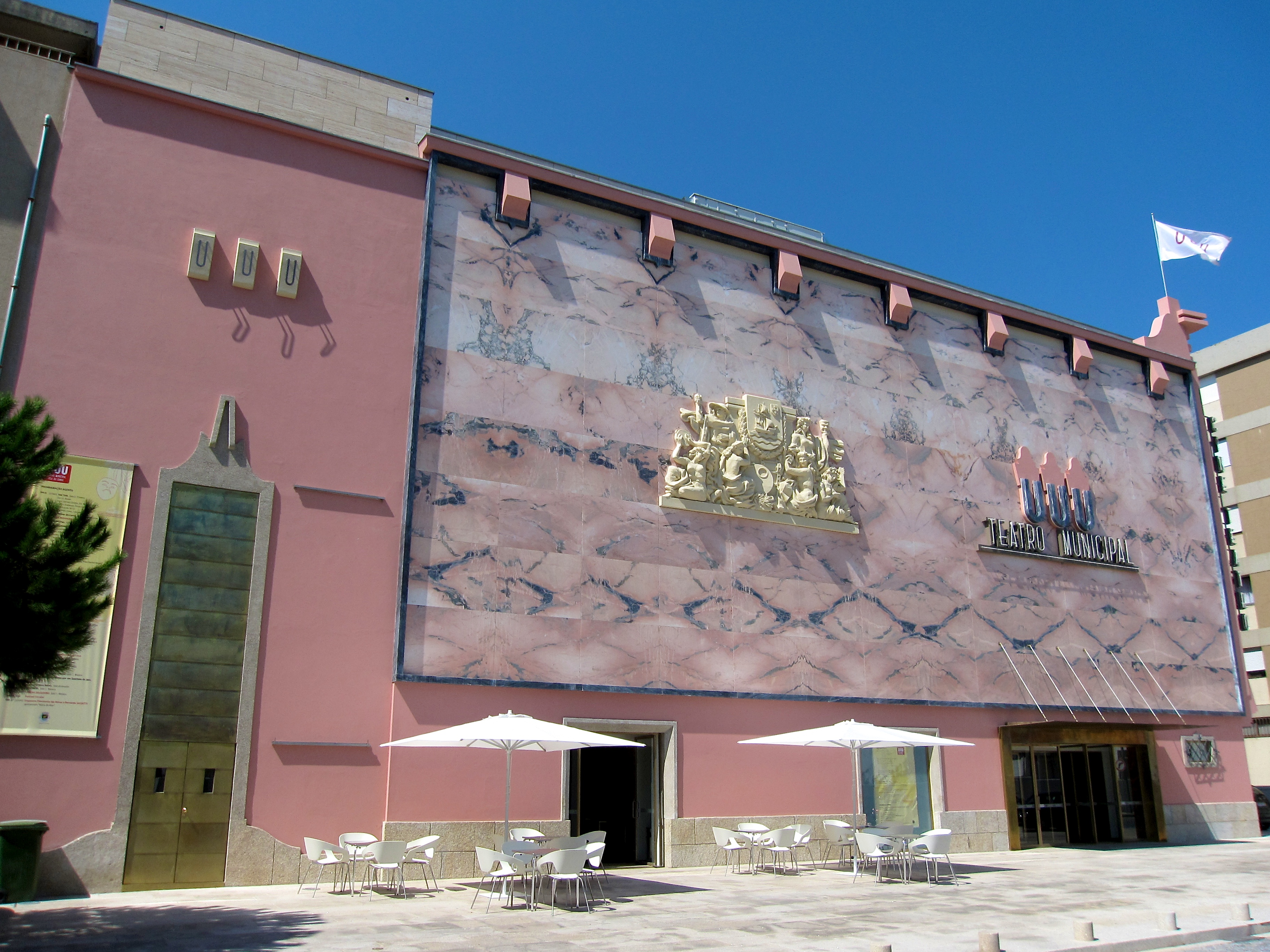
Municipal Theatre.

Vila do Conde is the centre of one of the more prestigious fairs of traditional artisans, that include quilts, wool sweaters, ironworks, in addition to needlework.

During the summer, the municipality is known for the several secular and religious celebrations. These include the Curtas Vila do Conde - International Film Festival, the Feira Nacional de Artesanato, the Feira da Gastronomia, the Feira das Actividades Agrícolas and the Festival of São João. Every four years, the religious Festivals of Corpo de Deus are significant, and known for the road covered mats of flowers, used in processions from the circuit the main churches.

The electronic band Sensible Soccers, formed in 2010, are based out of the village of Fornelo in the municipality.

== Sport ==
Rio Ave F.C. is based in the city.

== Notable people ==
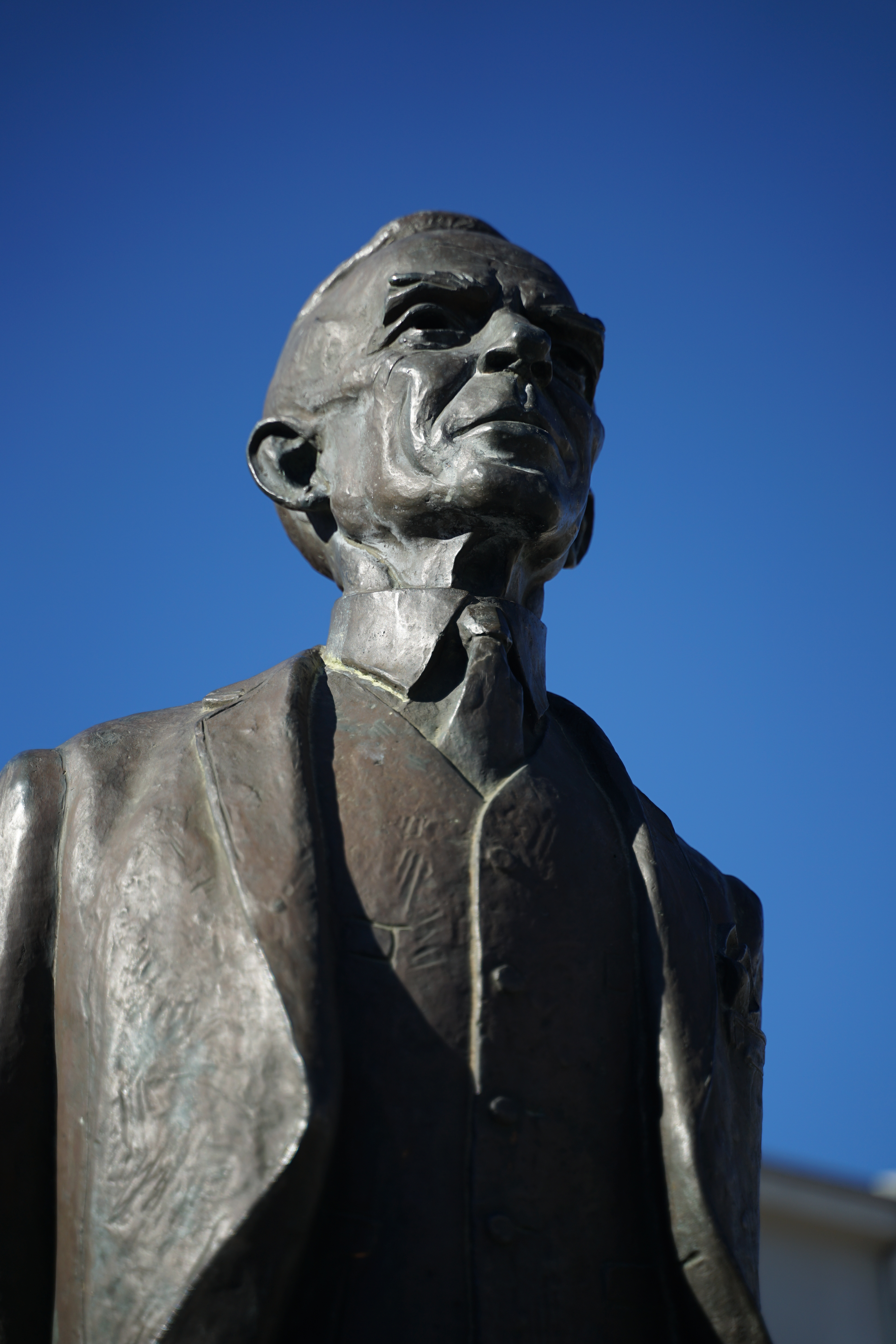
José Régio, 2020

- Manuel de Sá (1530-1596) a Portuguese Jesuit priest, theologian and exegete.
- José Maria dos Reis Pereira (1901–1969) pen name José Régio, a Portuguese writer.
- Albino Aroso (1923–2013) a doctor and politician, known as the father of family planning in Portugal.
- Manuela Azevedo (born 1970) a Portuguese singer.

=== Sport ===
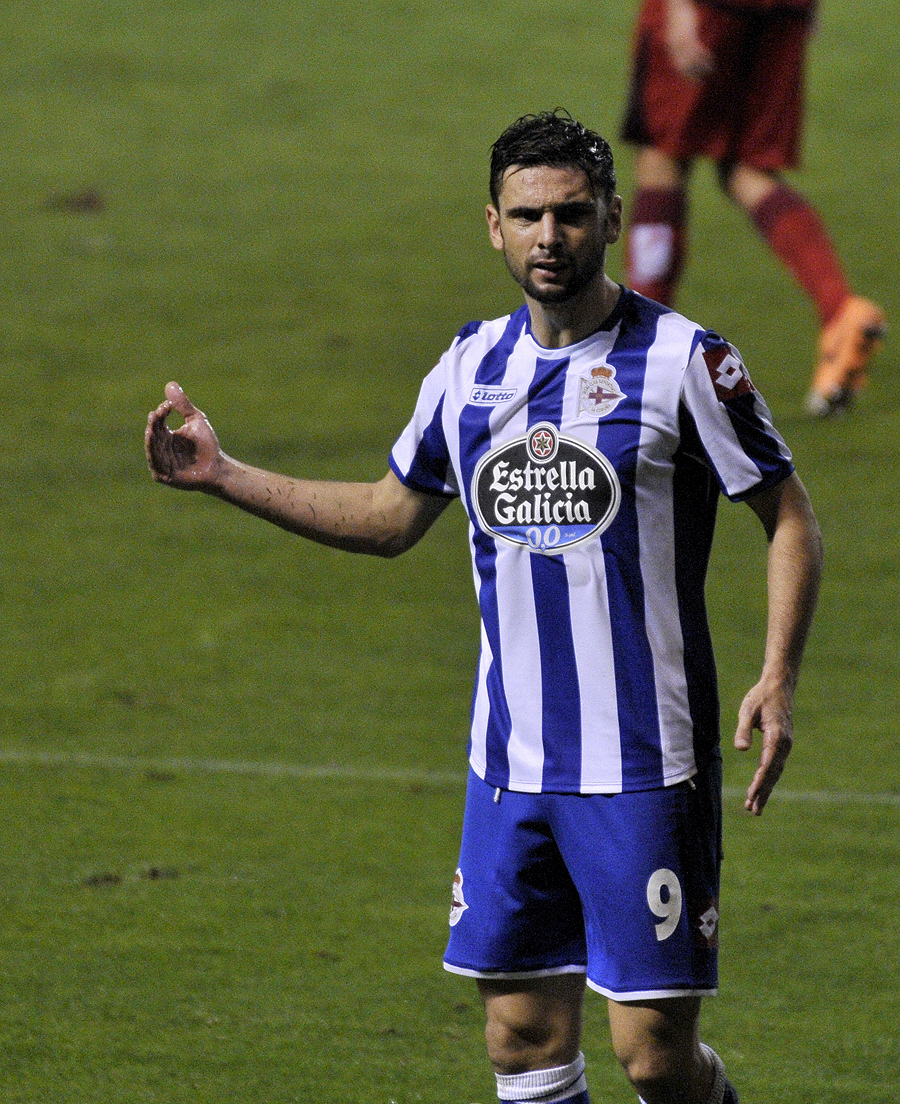
Hélder Postiga, 2014

- António André (born 1957) a retired footballer with 412 club caps and 20 for Portugal
- Paulinho Santos (born 1970) a retired footballer with 287 club caps and 30 for Portugal
- José Azevedo (born 1973) a Portuguese retired road racing cyclist
- Emanuel Braga (born 1975), known as Emanuel, a retired footballer with 465 club caps
- Hélder Postiga (born 1982) a retired footballer with 397 club caps and 71 for Portugal
- Fábio Coentrão (born 1988) a retired footballer with 240 club caps and 52 for Portugal
- André André (born 1989) a footballer with over 300 club caps and 3 for Portugal
- Ana Monteiro (born 1993) a butterfly swimmer, competed in the 2020 Summer Olympics
- Messias Baptista (born 1999) a sprint canoeist, competed at the 2020 Summer Olympics
- Raquel Queirós (born 2000) a road cyclist and cross-country mountain biker, competed at the 2020 Summer Olympics

== Twin towns – sister cities ==
Vila do Conde is twinned with:

- Ferrol, Spain
- Le Cannet, France
- Portalegre, Portugal
- Olinda, Brazil

== Sources ==
- Vilhena Barbosa, Ignacio de (1860). As cidades e villas da Monarchia portugueza que teem brasão d'armas [TheCities and Towns of the Portuguese Monarchy, which have Coats-of-Arms] (in Portuguese). Vol. 1. Lisbon, Portugal: Typohraphia do Panorama.
- Assunção Araújo, Maria da (26–29 September 1994), Protection and Conservation of Sampaio Area (Labruge, Vila do Conde, North of Portugal (PDF), vol. 94, Lisbon, Portugal: Littoral, pp. 1–10
- Araújo, M.A.; Gomes, A.; Chaminé, H.I.; Fonseca, P.E.; Gama Pereira, L.C.; Pinto de Jesus, A., Geomorfologia e geologia regional do sector de Porto–Espinho (W de Portugal): implicações morfoestruturais na cobertura sedimentar cenozóica [Regional geomorphology and geology from the Porto–Espinho sector (W Portugal): morphostructural implications to Cenozoic sedimentary cover] (PDF), vol. 28, Coruña, Spain: Cadernos Lab. Xeolóxico de Laxe, pp. 79–105
- Polónia, Amélia (June 2006), The Sea and its Impact on a Maritime Community: Vila do Conde, Portugal (1500-1640) (PDF), vol. XVIII (1 ed.), International Journal of Maritime History, pp. 199–222
