= Tourism in Vila Nova de Gaia =

Vila Nova de Gaia is a tourist destination in northern Portugal, located opposite Porto on the South bank of Douro river. The cities connect through several bridges over Douro river. Vila Nova de Gaia is home to several notable attractions, such as the Port wine cellars, Dom Luís I Bridge, the Teleferico, Monastery of Serra do Pilar, Douro Estuary and 18 km long beaches.

== Tourist attractions ==
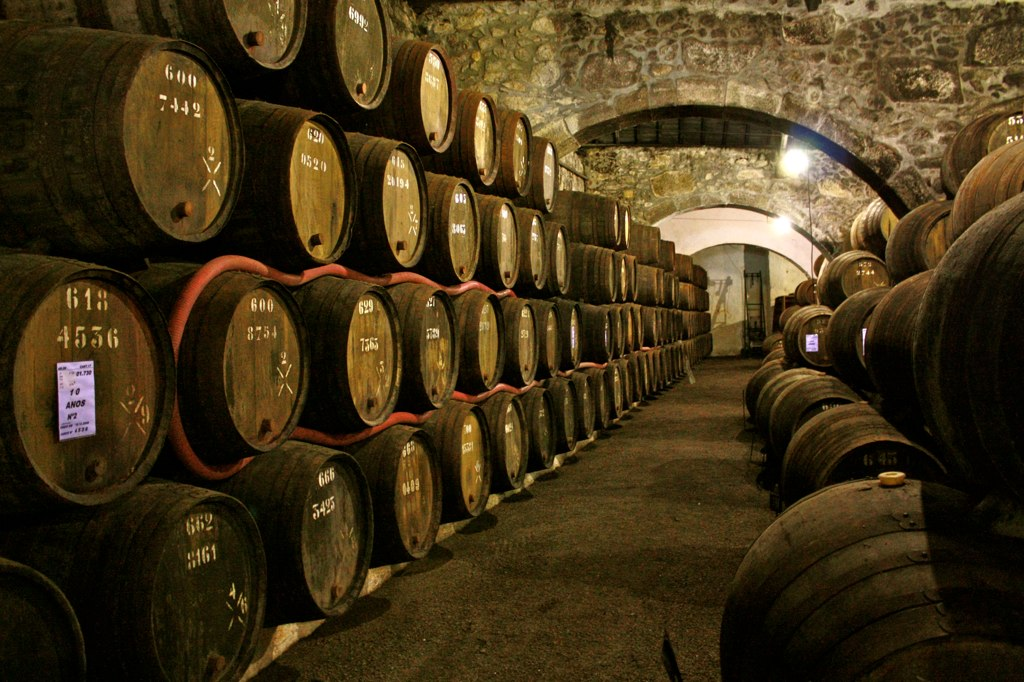
Port wine cellar

=== Cultural heritage ===
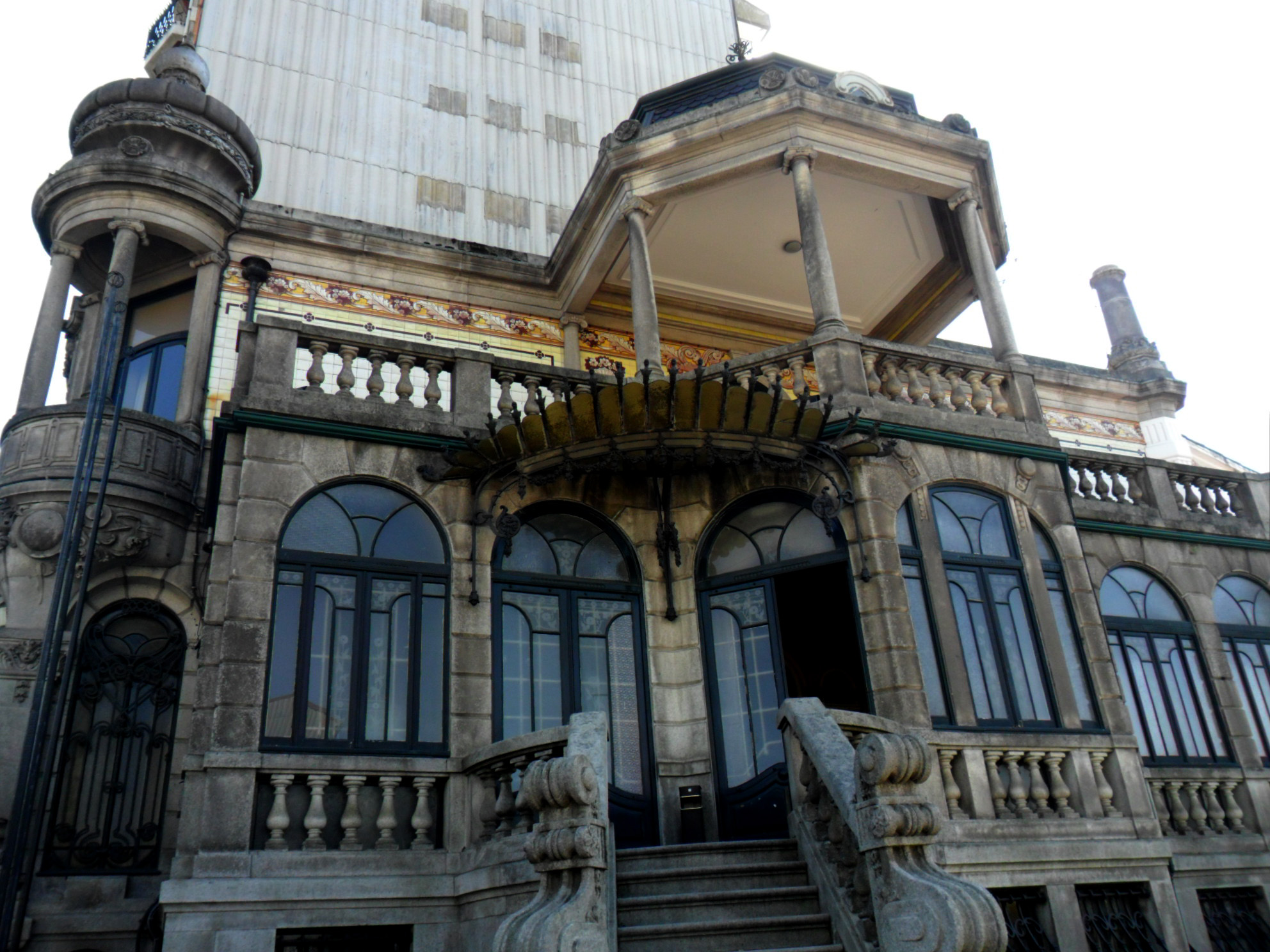
Barbot House

Port Wine Cellars (Portuguese: Caves de Vinho do Porto) - Vila Nova de Gaia is known for port wine production, especially wine cellars where port wine is stored that attract tourists’ attention. Port Wine Cellars are located on the left bank of Douro river in Vila Nova de Gaia. There are around 60 port houses in this area, some of them are open for visitors to watch the process of producing port wine.

Barbot House (Portuguese: Casa Barbot) - is an old single-family residence in the parish of Santa Marinha in Vila Nova de Gaia built on the initiative of Bernardo Pinto Abrunhosa in 1904. It belongs to the Barbot family since 1945. The building is the only example of Art Nouveau in Vila Nova de Gaia and includes Arabic elements in the roof, neoclassical and oriental elements in its tiles. The house has 3 floors, the first one serves as a basement. Its façade facing the Republic Avenue (Avenida da República) features 2 overlapping balconies of a joint composition. This building has been classified as a Property of Public Interest since 1982. Vila Nova de Gaia Municipality acquired this residence and transformed it into a Culture House.

=== Religious heritage ===
- Monastery of Serra do Pilar (Portuguese: Mosteiro da Serra do Pilar) is at the top of the Pilar mountain range (called Serra do Pilar), in the parish of Santa Marinha. The construction of this Church began in 1538 according to the order of John III of Portugal in order to transfer monks of Grijo to a new place after the Salvador de Grijó Monastery ruined. The Church has a circular shape covered with a dome surrounded by a balcony. The Church has been classified as Property of Public Interest since 1935. It was also declared as World Heritage Site by UNESCO in 1996.
- Grijo Monastery (Portuguese: Mosteiro de Grijó) is a Property of Public Interest since 1938 located in the parish of Grijo in Vila Nova de Gaia. It is believed that the construction of the church in the place of Muraceses dates back to the 10th century by two clerics, Guterre and Ausindo Soares. The church was enlarged in the 11th century by the relatives of the founders. In 1112, the church was transferred to its current location. The Monastery renovated in the 16th century includes the church with a single longitudinal nave, a square-shaped cloister and sacristy. It has an altar and three chapels on each side. The tomb of Rodrigo Sanches (illegitimate son of D. Sancho I) placed in the north part of the cloister which has been classified as a National Monument in 1910.
- Corpus Christi Convent (Portuguese: Convento Corpus Christi) was initially constructed on the bank of Douro river in 1345 by a Gaia noblewoman Dona Maria Mendes Petite. Dona Maria endowed the property to the Order of St. Domingos, and the opening of the Convent happened in 1354. The building experienced damages over some time as a result of the flooding of Douro River. Therefore, the nuns of St. Domingos completely reconstructed the church in the 17th century (1680). The chapel has an octagonal shape and is covered by a dome with 4 side altars. Tomb of Álvaro de Cernache has been placed here. The Convent has been classified as a Property of Public Interest since 2012.
- Benedictine Monastery (Portuguese: Mosteiro de Pedroso) was constructed in the 11th century in Romanesque style. The Monastery was extinguished in 1560, and after the expulsion of the Jesuits its property was shredded and sold (1759). In 1803, a wall was built between the church and convent. It has an irregular polygonal shape composed of a temple with three naves, a deep chapel and an attached body, also 2 bell towers. The monument has been classified as a Property of Public Interest since 2014.
- Church of Santa Marinha (Portuguese: Igreja de Santa Marinha) is an example of Baroque architecture remodeled by the architect Nicolau Nasoni in the 18th century (1745). Its high altar is covered with 18th century azulejo tiles describing Biblical scenes. Its bell tower was constructed in 1894. The Church has been classified as a Property of Public Interest since 1974.
- Chapel of the Senhor da Pedra (Portuguese: Capela do Senhor da Pedra) is located on the Miramar beach of Gulpilhares parish. It was reportedly erected on a rock in the 17th (1686) or 18th century. The chapel has a hexagonal shape. There are 3 altars in polychrome and gilt, and a wooden pulpit inside the chapel.
- Church of Bom Jesus (Portuguese: Capela do Bom Jesus) is also known as the Chapel by Nossa Senhora da Bonança since the 19th century. It is located in a historic town of Vila Nova de Gaia, close to the Castle of Gaia. The church is composed of 2 simple bodies with a sacristy built in the south part and a bell tower in the north part. The triumphal arch separates the main chapel from the main body.

=== Museums ===
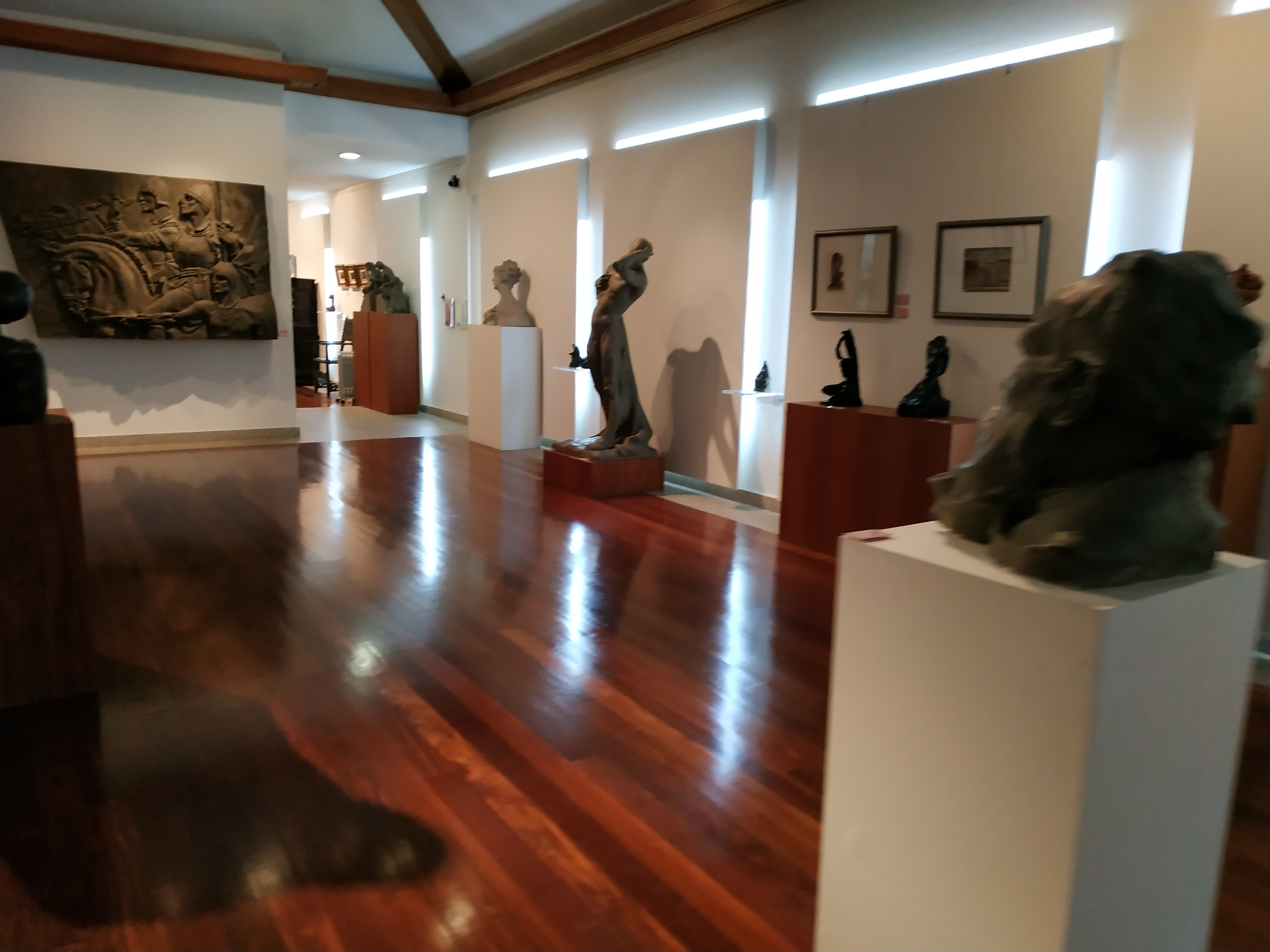
House-Museum Teixeira Lopes

House-Museum Teixeira Lopes| Diogo de Macedo Gallery (Portuguese: Casa-Museu Teixeira Lopes| Galerias Diogo de Macedo) is a cultural center consisting of the house of the sculptor António Teixeira Lopes and recently built Diogo de Macedo Galleries located in Vila Nova de Gaia. The building of the museum was constructed in 1895 by António Teixeira Lopes and his brother José Teixeira Lopes as a residence and an atelier. The Master donated this property to the municipality of Vila Nova de Gaia, and it was opened to the public as a house-museum in 1933. Diogo de Macedo Gallery was established in 1975 in a building annexed to Teixeira Lopes' atelier. The Art Galleries in the House-museum demonstrates works of Portuguese painters and sculptors, as well as pieces of pottery factories of Gaia, while Diogo de Macedo Galleries display the sculptural works of Diogo de Macedo and his art collection consisting of decorative art examples from 16th-20th centuries.

Solar dos Condes de Resende is a former manorial property which is now the headquarter of the Municipal House of Culture located in the village of Negrelos. Its construction dates back to the Medieval Ages. In the 16th century, the property belonged to Tomé da Costa, a nobleman from Vila Nova de Gaia, therefore it was also known as Quinta da Costa. The building has a semi-public chapel dedicated to São Tomé, a Baroque garden with camellias and a large tank of stonework that receives water from the source of São Mamede in Serra de Canelas. There is also a statue dedicated to the writer Eça de Queiroz who fell in love with the daughter of the owner (4th Count of Resende) and married her (Emília de Castro Pamplona). After the City Council of Gaia purchased the property in 1984, it has been operating as Municipal House of Culture.

== Nature ==
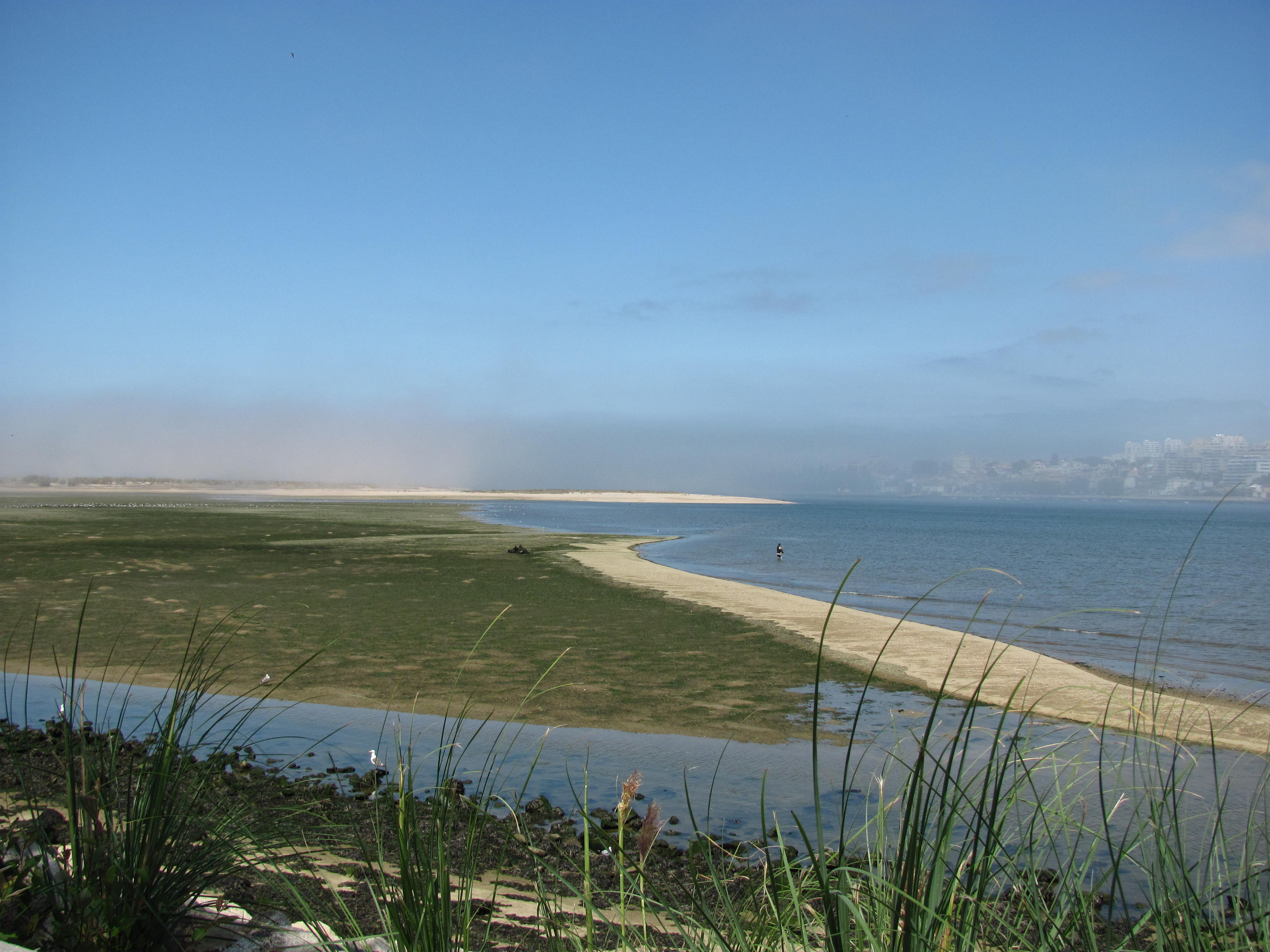
Nature Reserve of the Douro Estuary

Vila Nova de Gaia is the Portuguese municipality with the biggest number of Blue Flag beaches - 17 beaches along 17 km of seaside. Miramar, Granja, Aguda, Valadares, Francelos, Madalena, Canidelo and Praia da Granja are some of the famous ones.

The municipality has several parks, such as Dunes Park (Portuguese: Parque de Dunas), Botanical Park of Castelo (Portuguese: Parque Botanico do Castelo), Camelias Garden (Portuguese: Jardim das Camélias), Streams of Gaia (Portuguese: Ribeiras de Gaia), Maria Pia Bridge Park (Portuguese: Parque Ponte Maria Pia) in Vila Nova de Gaia, as well as the followings:

- Gaia Biological Park (Portuguese: Parque Biológico de Gaia) is the largest park in the city, with an area of 35 hectares. The Park established in 1983 as an environmental education center, features a 3 km walkway along with hundreds of species of animals and plants.
- Opened in August 2005, the Lavandeira Park (Portuguese: Parque da Lavandeira) is a place for leisure activities with a lake, pedestrian walks, picnic areas and theme gardens. It has an area of 11 hectares located in Oliveira do Douro.
- Jardim do Morro ("Garden of the Hill") is a garden located in the parish of Santa Marinha, near the Sera do Pilar Monastery. It was established in 1927. There is a lake, a number of plant species including Tilias.
- The Littoral Station of Aguda (Portuguese: Estação Litoral da Aguda) is a show aquarium opened in 1999 on the beach of Aguda (Portuguese: Praia da Aguda) in Arcozelo. The building designed by the architect João Paulo Peixoto includes 3 main sections: Fisheries Museum displaying fishery equipment; Aquarius demonstrating local aquatic fauna and flora, and the Department of Environmental Education and Scientific Research on marine ecology, fishery and aquaculture.
- Local Nature Reserve of the Douro Estuary (Portuguese: Reserva Natural Local do Estuário do Douro) is a small nature reserve established in 2007 with the aim of the protection of birds and landscape. There can be seen cormorants, herons, white egrets, tortoises, sea turtles, plovers, red knots, various species of seagulls, kingfishers among many other birds throughout a year. São Paio Bay is a popular spot for bird watchers.

== Other points of interest ==
=== Bridges ===
Dom Luís I Bridge is a railway, road and pedestrian double-deck metal arch bridge across the Douro River in Portugal connecting the cities of Porto and Vila Nova di Gaia. The bridge was constructed between 1881 and 1886. The length of its lower deck is 174 meters while the upper deck is 391 meters, the width of both is 5 meters. The upper deck has been adjusted to the movement of tram while the lower deck functions as a road. The bridge has been listed as Property of Public Interest since 1982.

Maria Pia Bridge is a railway bridge built in 1876-1877 to connect the cities of Porto and Vila Nova de Gaia. The bridge is composed of a parabolic arc of great aperture. It is based on three pillars on the side of Gaia and two pillars on the side of the Porto. In 1991 rail traffic was discontinued because of its one way direction and traffic speed restrictions. Maria Pia Bridge has been ranked as National Monument since 1982.

Arrábida Bridge is the second bridge between Porto and Vila Nova de Gaia built for road traffic by the engineer Edgar Cardoso. The construction finished in 1963 and the bridge was inaugurated in June. The main part of the bridge 70 m above the average level of water is supported by an arch with a span of 270 meters. It was the largest concrete arch in the world at the time of its inauguration. The bridge has been listed as National Monument since 2013.

St. Joao Bridge designed by Edgar Cardoso was put into use on June 24, 1991 on St.John’s Day. The main reason of its construction was replacing Maria Pia Bridge which had limited speed capacity. It's built of reinforced concrete with vertical pillars and 3 spans. The central span of 250 m is supported by two big pillars located on each bank of Douro river.

Freixo Bridge opened in September 1995 was designed by António Reis. It was built of reinforced concrete as a complement to Arrábida Bridge. The board of the bridge is 750 m long featuring twin beams and 8 spans.

Infante Bridge is a road bridge named after the Prince Henry the Navigator between Vila Nova de Gaia and Porto inaugurated in March 2003. The bridge designed by the engineer António Adão da Fonseca was built of reinforced concrete. Infante’s Bridge was constructed to replace the upper deck of Dom Luís I Bridge, though it’s used now by the “Yellow line” of Porto Metro. The board has 371 m length and 20 m width.

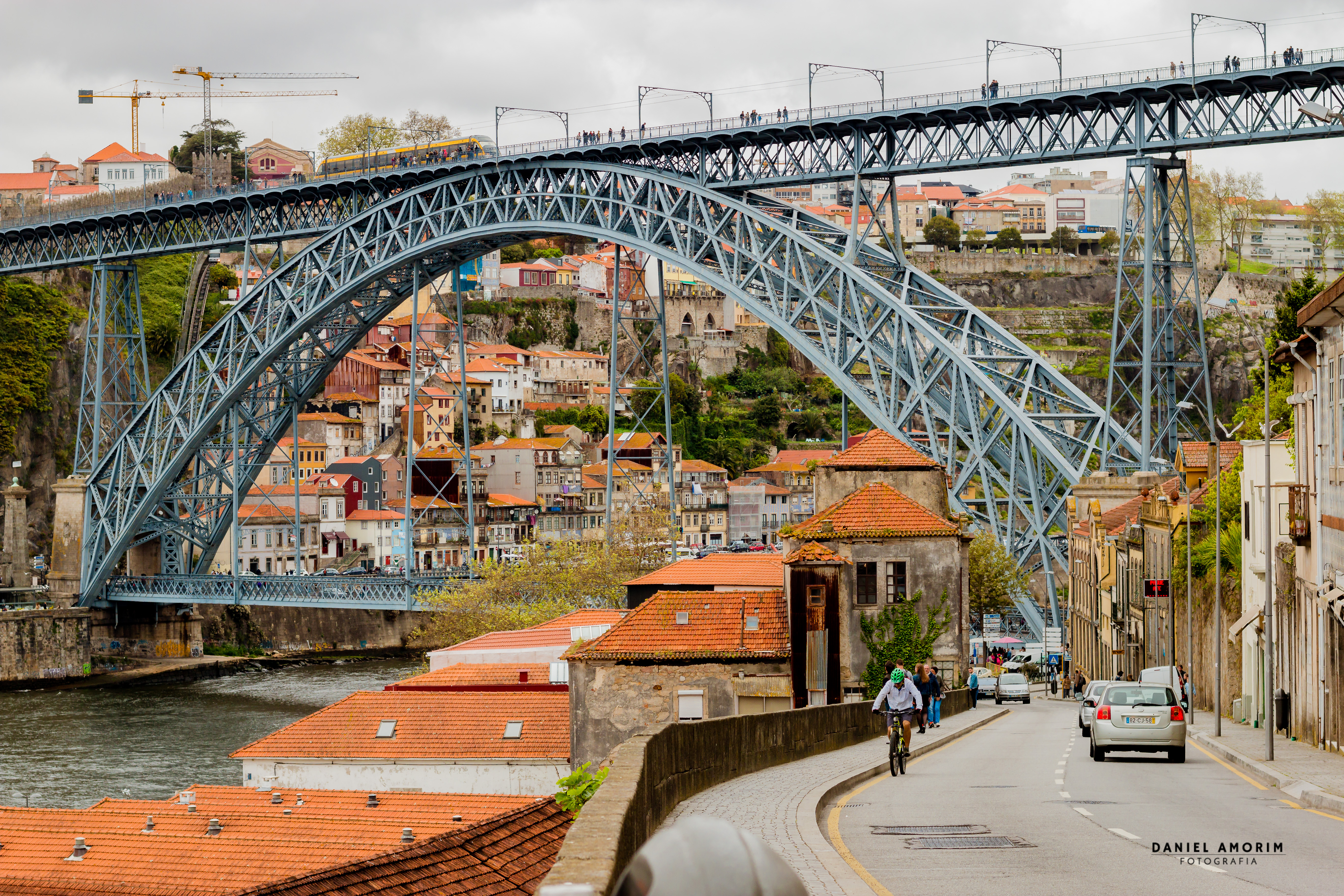
Dom Luis I Bridge

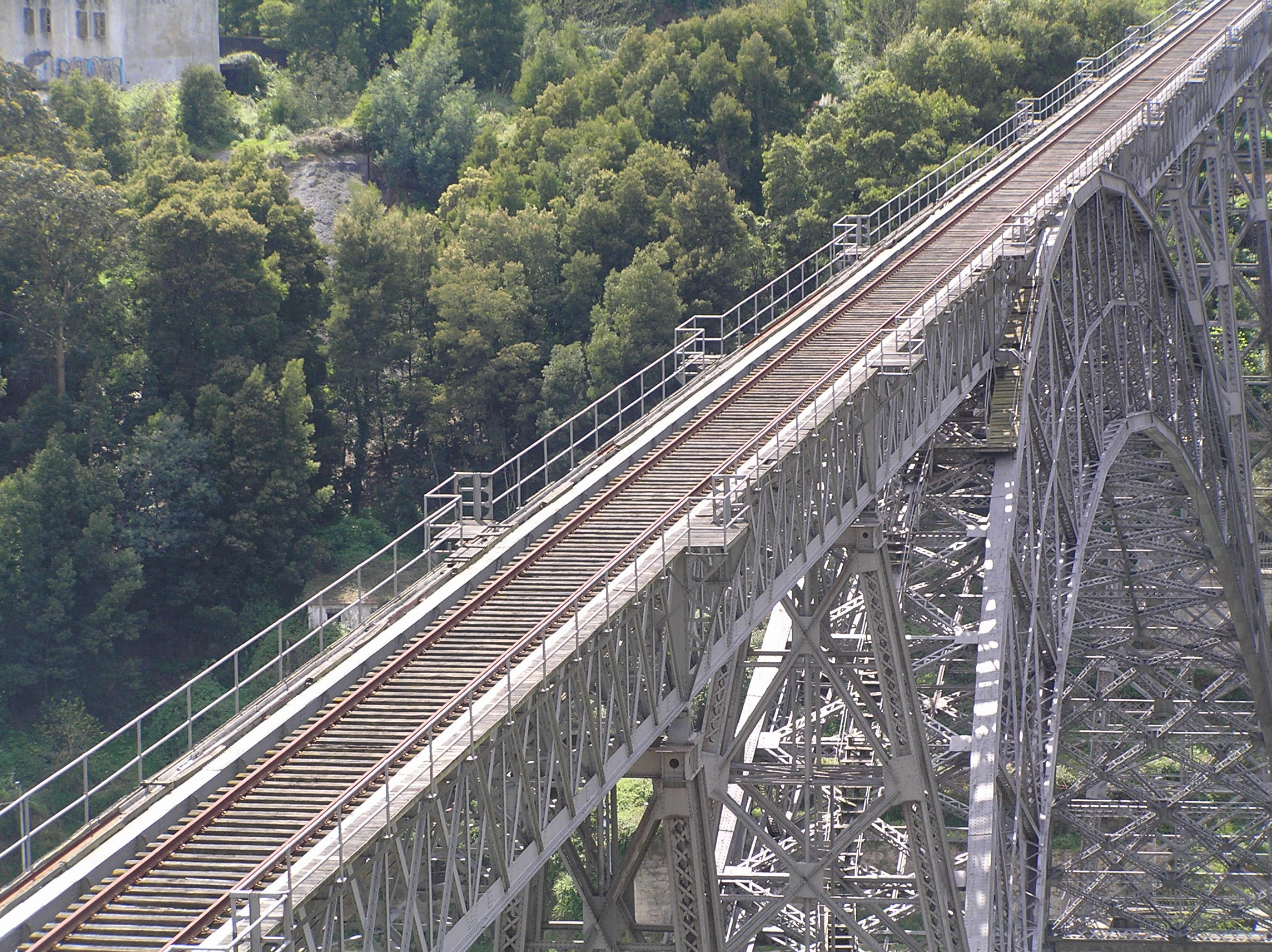
Maria Pia Bridge

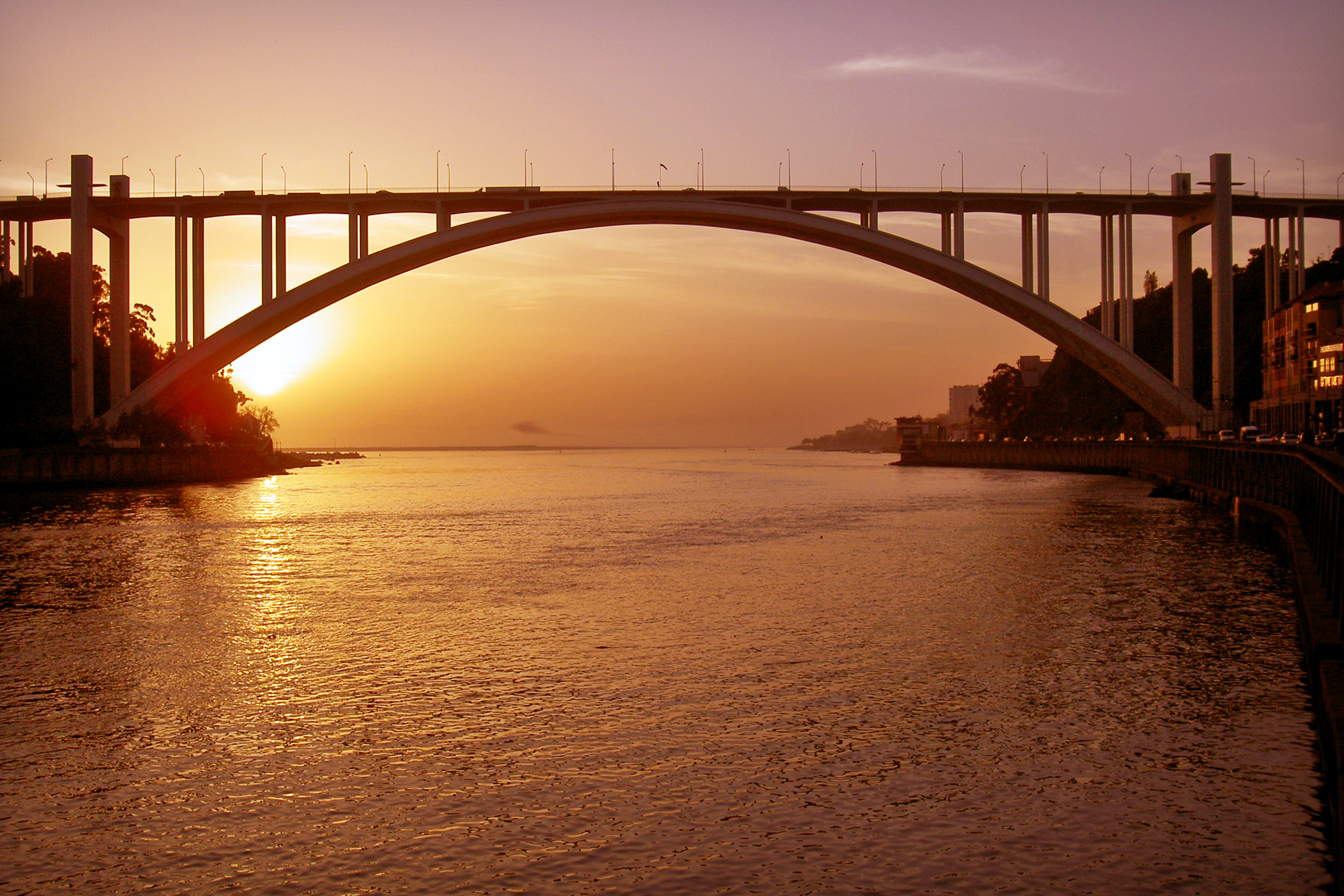
Arrábida Bridge

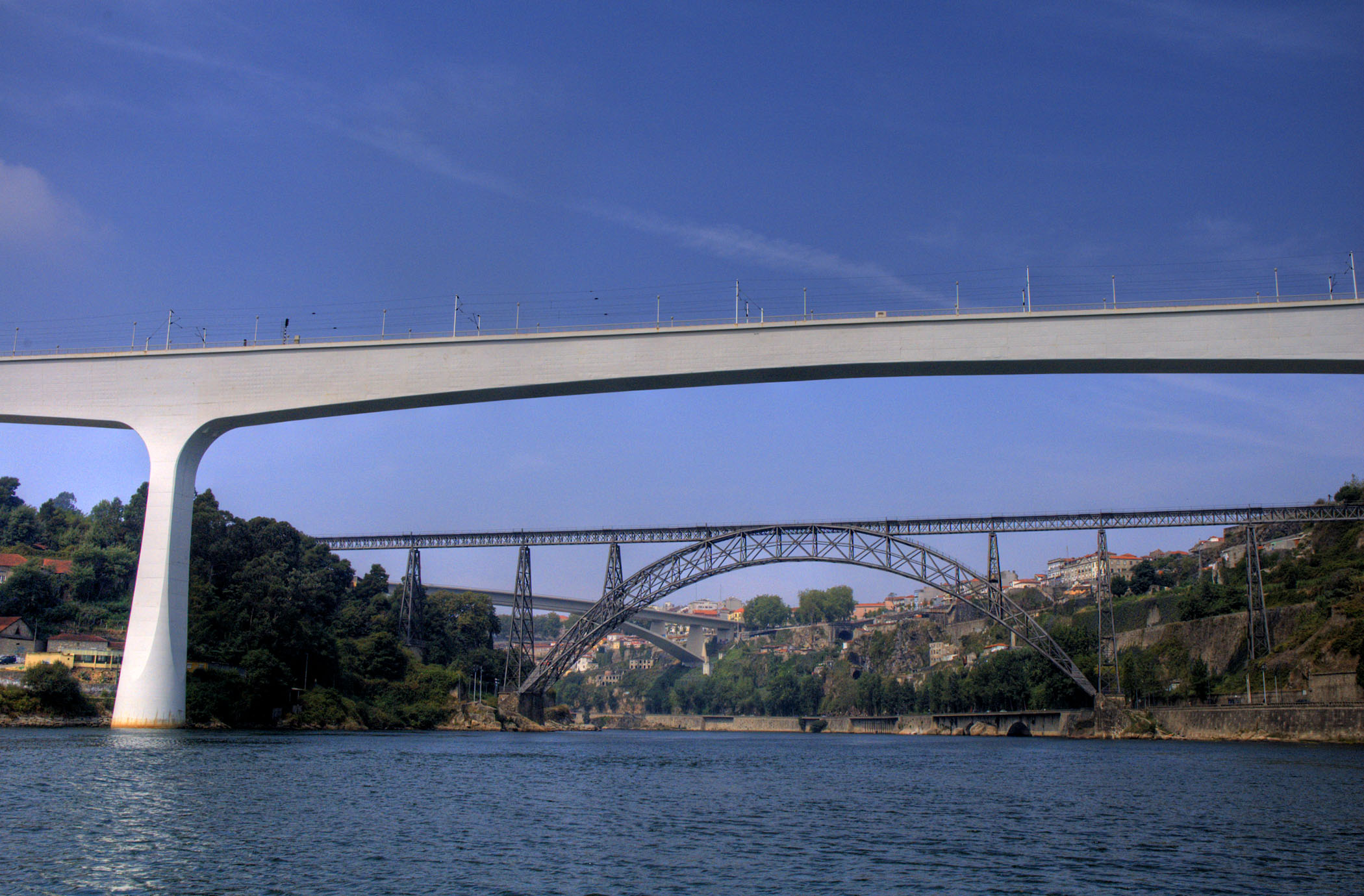
Ponte de São João

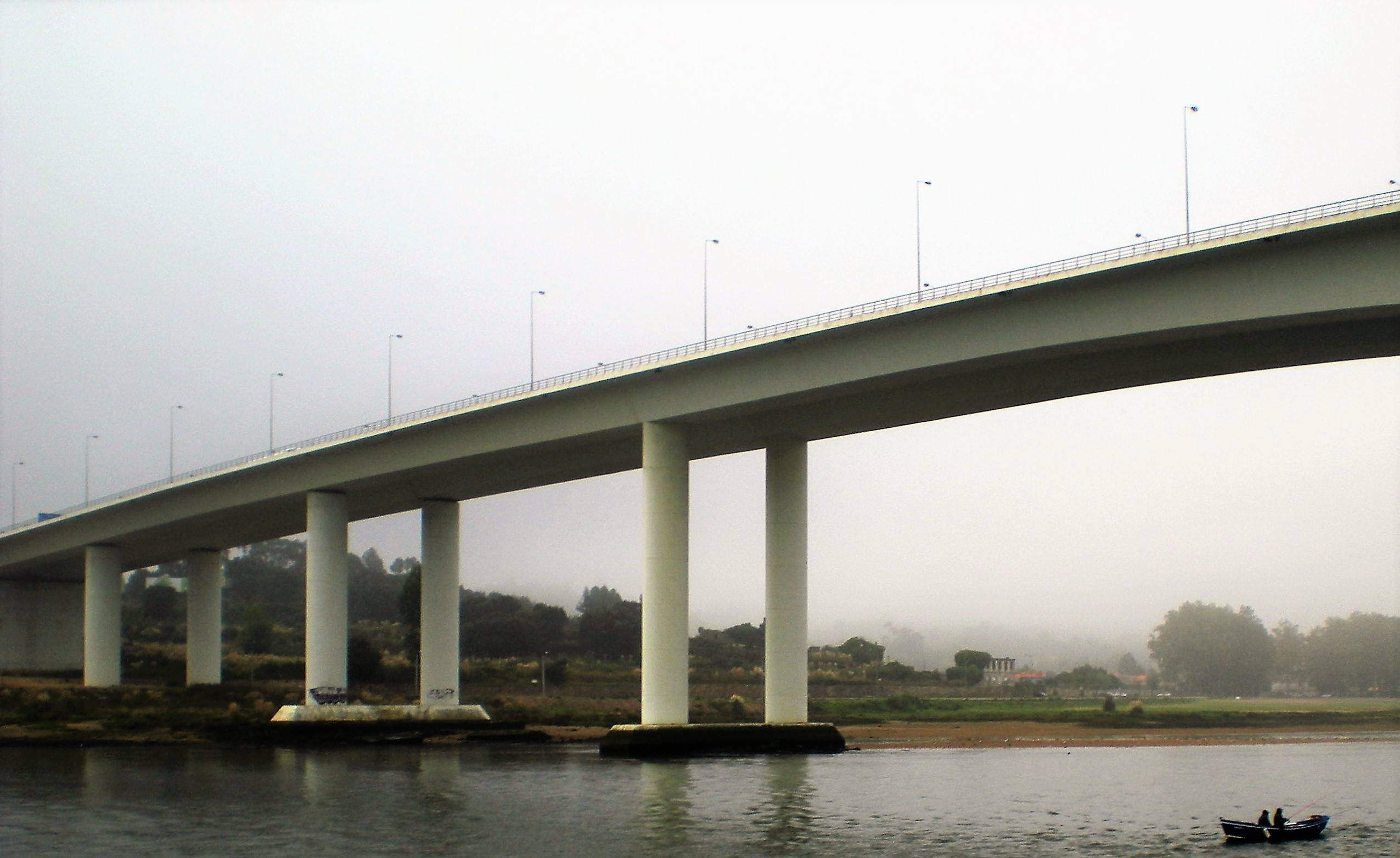
Freixo Bridge

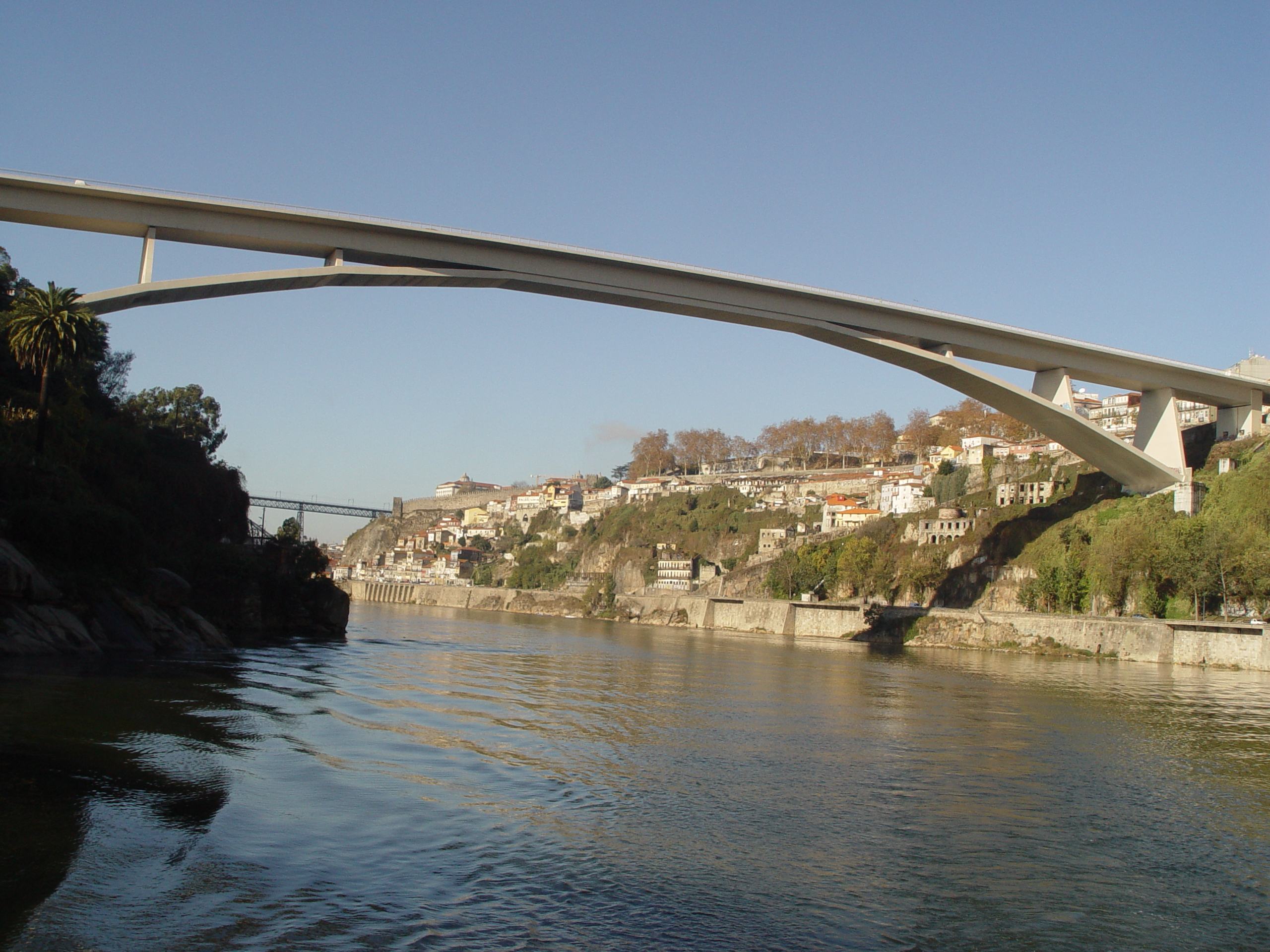
Infante Bridge

=== Zoo ===
Santo Inacio’s Zoo is located in the parish of Avintes. Opened in 2000, the Zoo hosts 800 animals and 260 species on an area of 15 hectares.

== Festivals ==
Vila Nova de Gaia has traditional festivals and pilgrimages filled with rituals and animation.

- At the beginning of the year, Pilgrimage of St. Gonçalo and St. Christopher (Portuguese: Romaria de S. Gonçalo e S. Cristóvão) takes place on the 1st Sunday after January 10. This festival is celebrated since the 17th century. Three groups (one from Santa Marinha and other 2 from Place of Rasa of the parish of Mafamude) parade with the figures and heads of St. Gonçalo and St. Cristóvão through the streets of Vila Nova de Gaia accompanied by thousands of believers. They meet with two local groups at the Church of Mafamude.
- Pilgrimage of Senhor da Pedra (Portuguese: Romaria do Senhor da Pedra) takes place Holy Trinity Sunday between May and June and continues for 3 days. Pilgrims visit the Chapel of Senhor da Pedra in Gulpilhares, women carrying baskets with food and men carrying wine in gourds or in ox-horns.
- St. John’s Feast (Portuguese: Festa de S. João) is celebrated on the night of 23-24 of June in Northern Portugal since the 15th century. People parade in the streets carrying plastic hammers, as well as singing and dancing. Moreover, participants pause some time to have traditional roasted sardines and green broth with special flavor specific to this night.
- Feast of Saint Peter of Afurada (Portuguese: Festa de S. Pedro da Afurada) is celebrated in Afurada, a fishing town on June 29 and the first Sunday of July. People wearing fishermen and fisherwomen costumes carry the images of saints to pay respect for their patron saint, St. Peter. Traditional roasted sardines and cornbread of Avintes are typical for this ceremony.
- Feast of Our lady of Good Health (Portuguese: Festa da Nossa Senhora da Saúde) takes place on August 15 by visiting Mount Murado located in Carvalhas, Pedroso to fulfill promises and prays. There is a Chapel on the top of the hill with an altar built under an awning. Pilgrims carrying long candles and wooden platforms go down, then pass around the cross and climb the steep slope one more time.
- Feast of Broa (Portuguese: Festa da Broa) is celebrated in Avintes in the first half of September since 1988. Avintes is famous for its local cuisine, especially Broa de Avintes, traditional dark brown bread with specific flavor made of corn and rye flours.

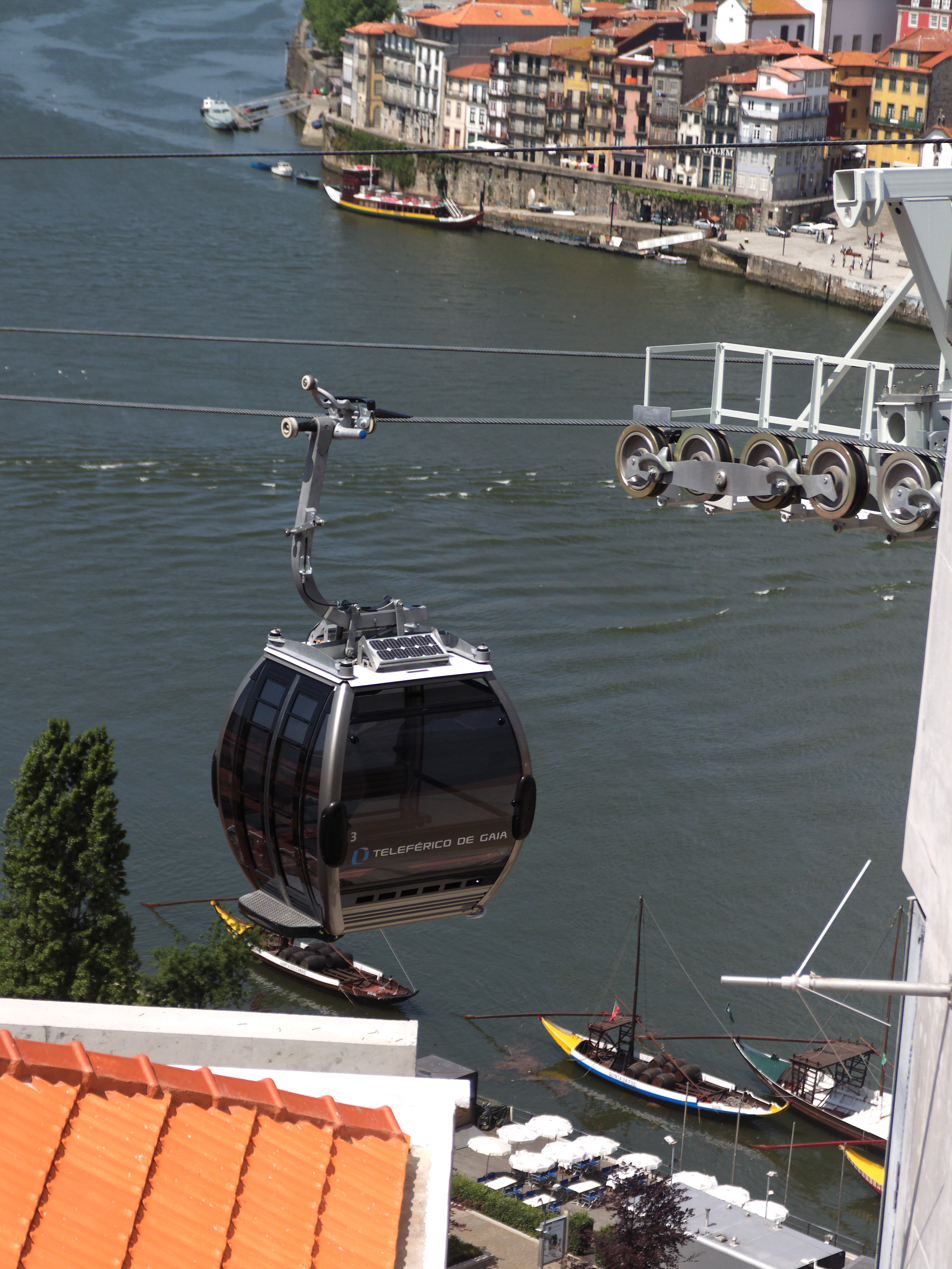
Gaia Cable car

== Transportation ==
Vila Nova de Gaia offers many means of public transportation together with Porto: the Underground (Porto Metro), tram, local buses, taxis and boats.

The Teleférico de Gaia connects the bank of Douro river with the upper deck of the Dom Luís I Bridge. The upper station is located next to Jardim do Morro station of the Porto Metro and the Serra do Pilar Monastery. The lower station is on the riverside promenade of Cais de Gaia.

== See also ==
- Tourism in Portugal
- Tourism in Lisbon
- Tourist attractions in Porto
