= A1 motorway (Portugal) =

Road in Portugal

A1
- Portuguese: Auto-estrada do Norte

Route information
- Part of E01 E80
- Length: 303 km (188 mi)
- Existed: 1960–present

Major junctions
- South end: Lisbon
- North end: Porto

Location
- Country: Portugal

Highway system
- Roads in Portugal

The A 1—Autoestrada do Norte—is the biggest and the most important highway in Portugal. It connects the two largest cities in Portugal, Lisbon and Porto, also passing by some district capitals and industrial zones. Being the most important connection between two major cities, it was designed to be parallel to other roads, like the EN1.

At 303 km long, the highway starts in Lisbon, in the interchange between the CRIL and the Vasco da Gama Bridge. Then the road goes along some cities near Lisbon, mainly Alverca do Ribatejo and Alenquer. Near Torres Novas it connects with the A23, a road that connects the A1 with Castelo Branco and Vilar Formoso, by the A25, near the border with Spain. This interchange marks the end of the 3x3 profile that started in Lisbon, to start a profile of two lanes.

Construction began in 1960, first with a 3.6 km section in Gaia, from the current interchange with A44 to just before the Arrabida bridge. On 22 June 1963, the Arrabida bridge opened, also a 6.8 km southern extension to Carvalhos had been completed. On the southern end, first to open was the 25 km section from Lisbon to Vila Franca de Xira on 28 May 1961.

Construction would not resume before the democratization and the establishment of Brisa company on 22 November 1972; the next 6 km section from Vila Franca to Carregado opening on 26 August 1977. More intensive construction began in the 1980s, in 1982, the first section outside of Lisbon and Porto urban areas opened - the Coimbra bypass from Condeixa to Mealhada. The final section - 87.4 km from Torres Novas to Condeixa - opened on 13 September 1991.

The highway is owned by Brisa. A trip between Lisbon and Porto using the A1 costs €22.20.

== Exits ==
=== Lisbon - Porto ===
Number of the exit	Km	Destinations	Exit road
1	0	Algés / Odivelas Setúbal / Montijo	A 12 IC 17
	5	São João da Talha	N 10
1A	8	Póvoa de Santa Iria / Vialonga Sacavém / Moscavide	N 115-5 IC 2
2	14	Alverca do Ribatejo / Vialonga	N 10
	14	Praça de Portagem de Alverca (toll)	
2	14	Cascais / Loures	A 9
2A	20	Vila Franca de Xira (sul) / Alhandra	N 10
3	25	Vila Franca de Xira (norte) / Porto Alto	N 1
3A	29	Plataforma Logística de Lisboa Norte	N 1
4	30	Carregado / Alenquer Arruda dos Vinhos Benavente / ALGARVE	N 3 A 10
5	47	Aveiras / Alcoentre / Azambuja	N 366
5A	57	Cartaxo	N 114-2
6	65	Santarém ( A 13 )	N 114
6A	67	Caldas da Rainha / Rio Maior	A 15
7	94	Torres Novas / Abrantes Castelo Branco / Tomar	A 23
8	114	Fátima Ourém	N 356
9	129	Leiria / Marinha Grande	A 8
10	153	Pombal / Castelo Branco Figueira da Foz	IC 8
10A	169	Soure	N 348
11	181	Condeixa / Lousã	IC 2 A 13-1
12	189	Coimbra (South) / Taveiro / Alfarelos	N 341
13	197	Coimbra (North) / Viseu Fig. da Foz / Cantanhede	IP 3 A 14
14	209	Mealhada / Cantanhede	N 234
15	232	Aveiro (South) /Águeda	N 235
16	247	Aveiro (North) Viseu	A 25
17	258	Vale de Cambra / Oliveira de Azeméis	N 224
18	274	Sta. Maria da Feira / São João da Madeira	N 223
18A	284	Espinho (East) / Picoto	A 41
	285	Praça de Portagem de Grijó (toll)	
18B*	288	Carvalhos / Grijó	
19	291	Carvalhos Gaia via N1	N1
20**	292	Porto via Freixo Bridge Gondomar / Braga	A 20
21*	294	Porto via Freixo Bridge Espinho / Canelas	A 29
22	296	Gaia (Santo Ovídio)	
23	298	Gaia (Coimbrões) Espinho / Valadares	A 44 - VCI A 44
24	300	Gaia (Devesas) Canidelo	
25	302	Gaia (Afurada)	
	302	Arrábida Bridge	
	303	Direction of Freixo Bridge	A 28
* Exit only available on north–south side ** Exit only available on south–north side
