= Valadares =

Valadares may refer to:

== Places in Portugal ==
- Valadares, a civil parish in Baião Municipality
- Valadares, a civil parish in Monção Municipality
- Valadares, a civil parish in São Pedro do Sul Municipality
- Valadares (Vila Nova de Gaia), a civil parish in Vila Nova de Gaia Municipality

== People with the surname ==
- Guido Valadares (died 1976), Timorese politician and independence activist

== Other uses ==
- Cerâmica de Valadares, a manufacturer of bathroom sanitary ware

== See also ==
- Valladares
