= Brazão =

Brazão or Brazao is a surname. Notable people with the surname include:

- Chiquinho Brazão, Brazilian businessman and politician
- David Brazão (born 2001), Portuguese footballer
- Domingos Brazão (born 1965), Brazilian politician
- Gabriel Brazão (born 2000), Brazilian footballer
- Márcio Salomão Brazão da Rosa (born 1997), Cabo Verdean footballer
- Iris de Freitas Brazao (1896–1989), lawyer
- Pedro Brazão (born 2002), Portuguese footballer

== See also ==
- Theatre Eduardo Brazão, a theater in Vila Nova de Gaia, Portugal
