= Sanatório Marítimo do Norte =

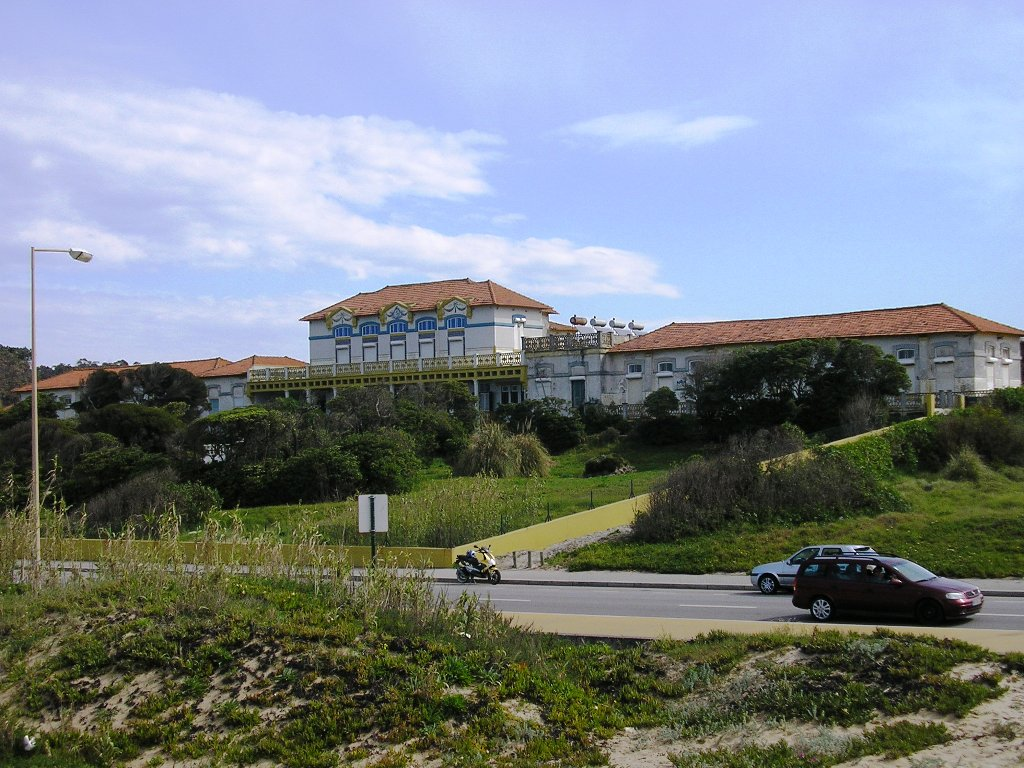
Sanatório Marítimo do Norte, in Valadares.

Sanatório Marítimo do Norte is an old sanatorium (a place where people suffering of tuberculosis were treated) placed in Praia de Valadares, a place in the parish of Valadares, in the Vila Nova de Gaia municipality in Northern Portugal.

== History ==
Sanatório Marítimo do Norte was built in 1916, but only opened in 1917. It was built on the seashore, because sea water is rich in iodine. This sanatorium, founded by Joaquim Gomes Ferreira Alves worked until 1978, when its founder died. After that Sanatório Marítimo do Norte was given to the Portuguese State, becoming progressively abandoned. Recently, there was created a project of rehabilitation of Sanatório Marítimo do Norte.

== The building ==
Sanatório Marítimo do Norte was projected by the architect Francisco de Oliveira Ferreira, who also projected the Heliântia building. This building is a candidate for an IPPAR classification.
