= Santa Marinha =

Santa Marinha may refer to the following places in Portugal:

- Santa Marinha (Ribeira de Pena), a civil parish in the municipality of Ribeira de Pena
- Santa Marinha (Seia), a civil parish in Seia Municipality
- Santa Marinha (Vila Nova de Gaia), a civil parish in the municipality of Vila Nova de Gaia
