= Praia de Valadares =

Beach in Portugal

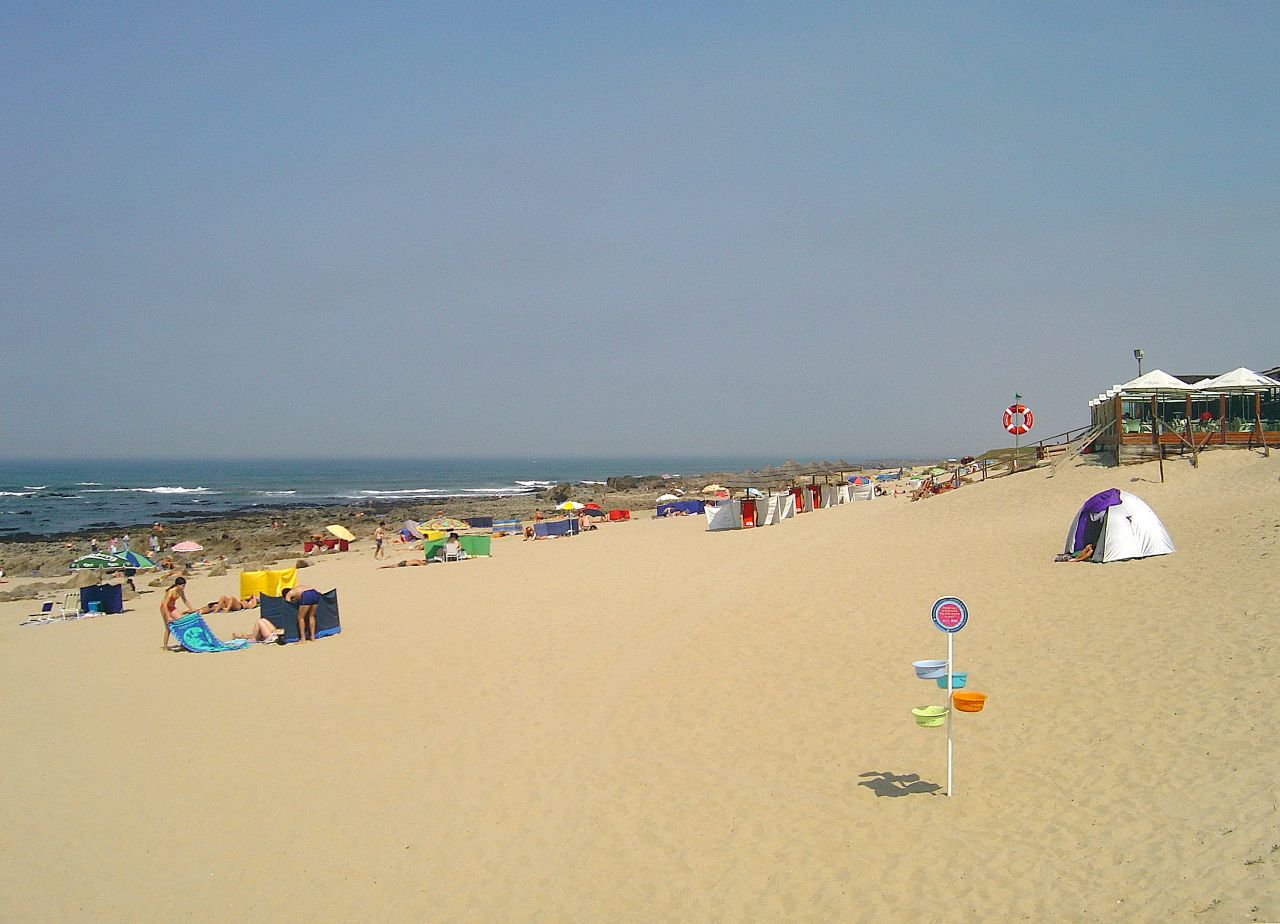
Praia de Valadares

Praia de Valadares is a beach and locality in Portugal, located in the parish of Valadares, Vila Nova de Gaia.

== Geography and climate ==
Praia de Valadares is located on the western coast of northern Portugal. It has an Atlantic-Mediterranean climate. It presents a green dune system that expands in the south. The native vegetation is mainly composed by pine trees. The forest areas in Praia de Valadares have a mix of pine trees and eucalyptus. The beach is divided by north and south (Praia de Valadares Norte and Praia de Valadares Sul), both considered Blue Flag beaches. The beach has several bars and cafés.

== History ==
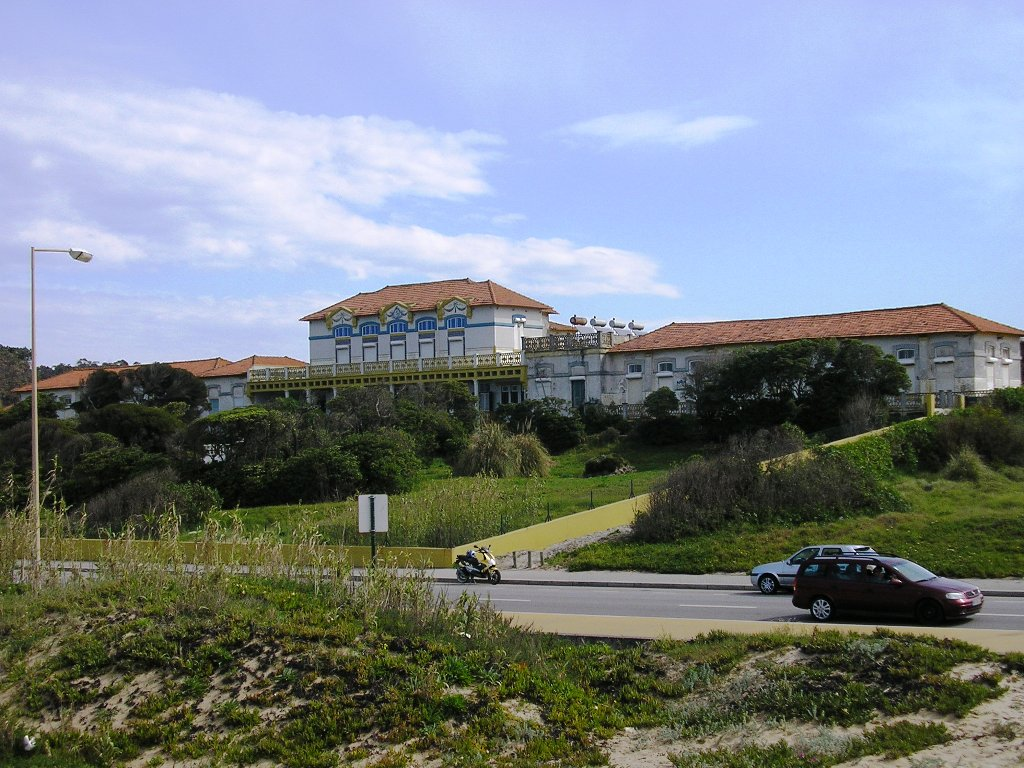
Sanatório Marítimo do Norte, in Valadares

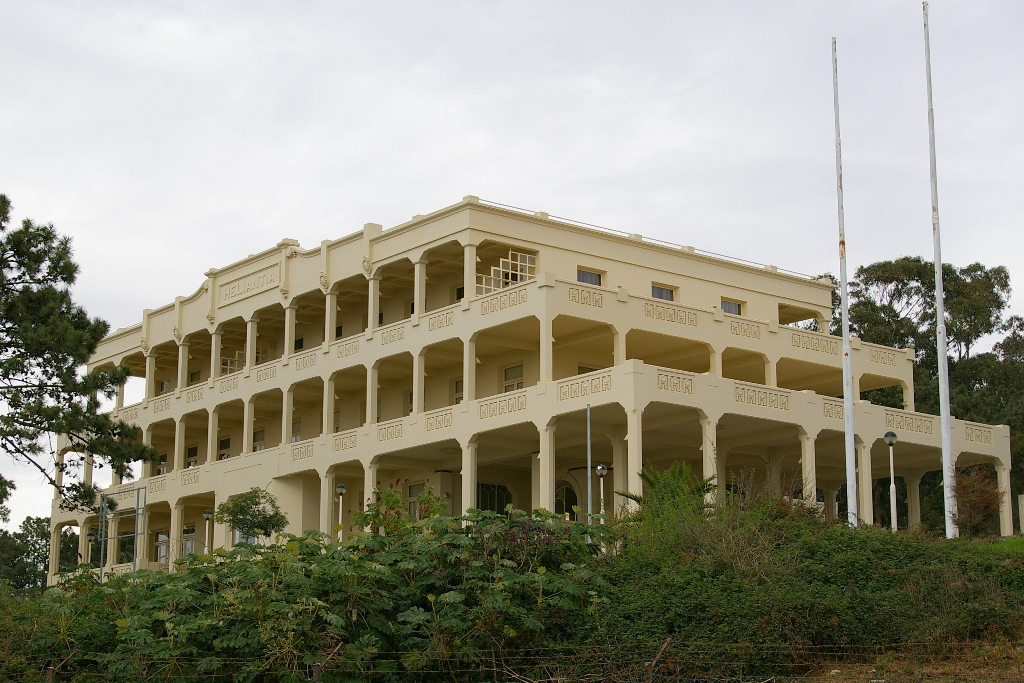
Clínica Heliântia, in Valadares

Nowadays, the oldest building in Praia de Valadares is Sanatório Marítimo do Norte (a sanatorium where diseases like tuberculosis were treated), built in 1916. The construction of that building was the beginning of the development of Praia de Valadares. Before that, it had nothing but agricultural fields and forest. In the 1920/1930s the oldest standing houses in Praia de Valadares were built in Largo da Praia. In 1930 was built the Clínica Heliântia, a project of the architect Francisco de Oliveira Ferreira, who also built Sanatório Marítimo do Norte. In the 60s the first school (Escola da Marinha) was created in Praia de Valadares, replacing an old "Posto de Ensino" (centre of teaching).

== Culture ==
The patron saint of this place is S. Salvador, to whom every year is dedicated a small feast called "Festa em honra do Divino Salvador". There is also a chapel in Praia de Valadares with the name of this saint.

== Main problems ==
Alcoholism and illiteracy are the main problems of this place, affecting mainly the elderly. In the 1970s and 1980s, there was a wide spread of drug consumption and sale in Praia de Valadares, which decreased in the 1990s as a consequence of the growing urban development. There is also a problem with dog owners not picking up after their pets and not following the rules banning dogs from the beach and walkways.

== Notable residents ==
- António Oliveira - former football coach of Portugal; lived in Praia de Valadares
