= Velhote =

Portuguese sweet bread with sugar and cinnamon

- Region or state: Valadares, Vila Nova de Gaia
- Created by: Maria Francisca da Silva
- Main ingredients: Flour, eggs, lemon juice, sugar, cinnamon

Velhote is a typical dessert of the parish of Valadares, Vila Nova de Gaia, Portugal. Velhotes are a kind of sweet bread with sugar and cinnamon. They are typically served on Saturdays and by the time of Sr. dos Aflitos, Valadares' most important religious feast.

Velhotes were baked for the first time in the 1880s by Maria Francisca da Silva, a "Braguesa" (a lady who came from Braga) and soon became popular. Only a little of the velhote's history is known, but the legend says that when king Carlos I and Queen Amélie of Orleans came to Porto, they ate velhotes.

== Recipe ==
The original recipe included flour, sugar, eggs, cinnamon, lemon juice, yeast and saffron, but the way of baking this sweet bread has changed a lot since the 19th century.

== Confraria dos Velhotes ==
There is a "confraria gastronómica" (gastronomic brotherhood) in Valadares (Confraria Gastronómica do Velhote) which intends to dignify and spread the existence of the velhote as a typical sweet.
