= Valadares & a Cidade em Foco =

Valadares & a Cidade em Foco ("Valadares and the city highlighted" in English), misspelled Valadares e a Cidade em Foco, is a regional monthly newspaper which covers the area of Valadares and other parishes of Gaia, on the coast of Portugal. The newspaper was founded in 1998 and costs €0.75. Most of the articles are local stories about Valadares and Gaia, and there are some general news and opinion texts on different subjects such as religion, sport, the economy, and politics.
