= Grijó (Vila Nova de Gaia) =

- Civil parish
- Coordinates: 41°02′N 8°35′W
- Country: Portugal
- Region: Norte
- Metropolitan area: Porto
- District: Porto
- Municipality: Vila Nova de Gaia
- Disbanded: 2013

Area
  - Total: 11.33 km^{2} (4.37 sq mi)

Population (2011)
  - Total: 10,578
  - Density: 933.6/km^{2} (2,418/sq mi)
- Time zone: UTC+00:00 (WET)
  - Summer (DST): UTC+01:00 (WEST)

Grijó (Portuguese pronunciation: [ɡɾiˈʒɔ]) is a former civil parish in the municipality of Vila Nova de Gaia, Portugal. In 2013, the parish merged into the new parish Grijó e Sermonde. The population in 2011 was 10,578, in an area of 11.33 km². It is the birthplace of André Gomes who plays for Lille OSC.

== History ==
Grijó was the seat of a municipality until the beginning of the 19th century. The municipality was composed of a single parish and, in 1801, had 1,523 inhabitants.

== History ==
On 10–11 May 1809, in the context of the Peninsular War, the Battle of Grijó took place near the town of Grijó.

== See also ==
- Tourism in Vila Nova de Gaia
- Municipalities of Portugal
