= Freixo Bridge =

Ponte do Freixo
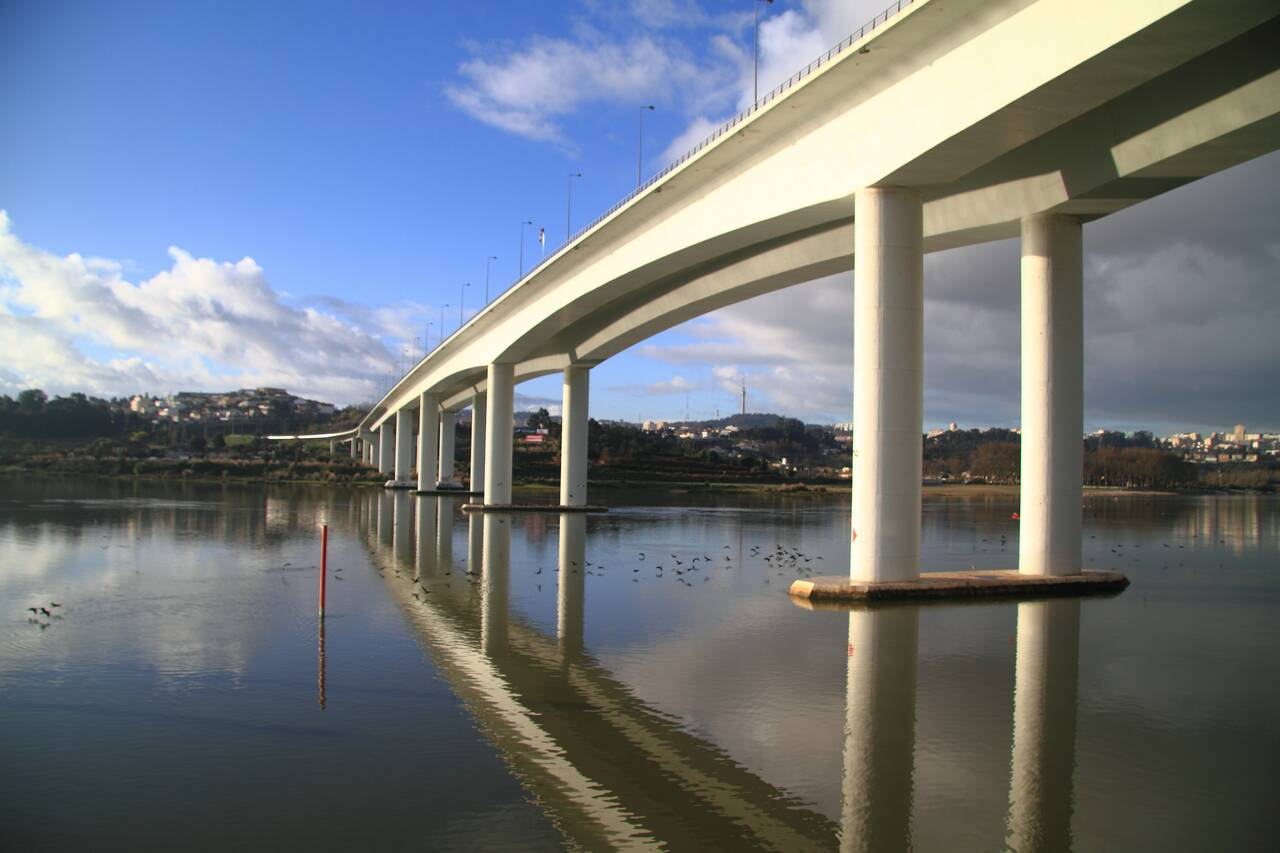
- Coordinates: 41°08′31″N 08°34′46″W
- Carries: Motor vehicles

History
- Opened: 1995

The Freixo Bridge (Portuguese: Ponte do Freixo) which was inaugurated in 1995 is a Portuguese bridge over the Douro river, connecting Vila Nova de Gaia and Porto. The purpose of its construction was to create an alternative to Arrábida and D. Luis I bridges. The designers of the bridge are António Reis and Daniel de Sousa. The bridge with total length of 705 m has 8 spans.

== Gallery ==
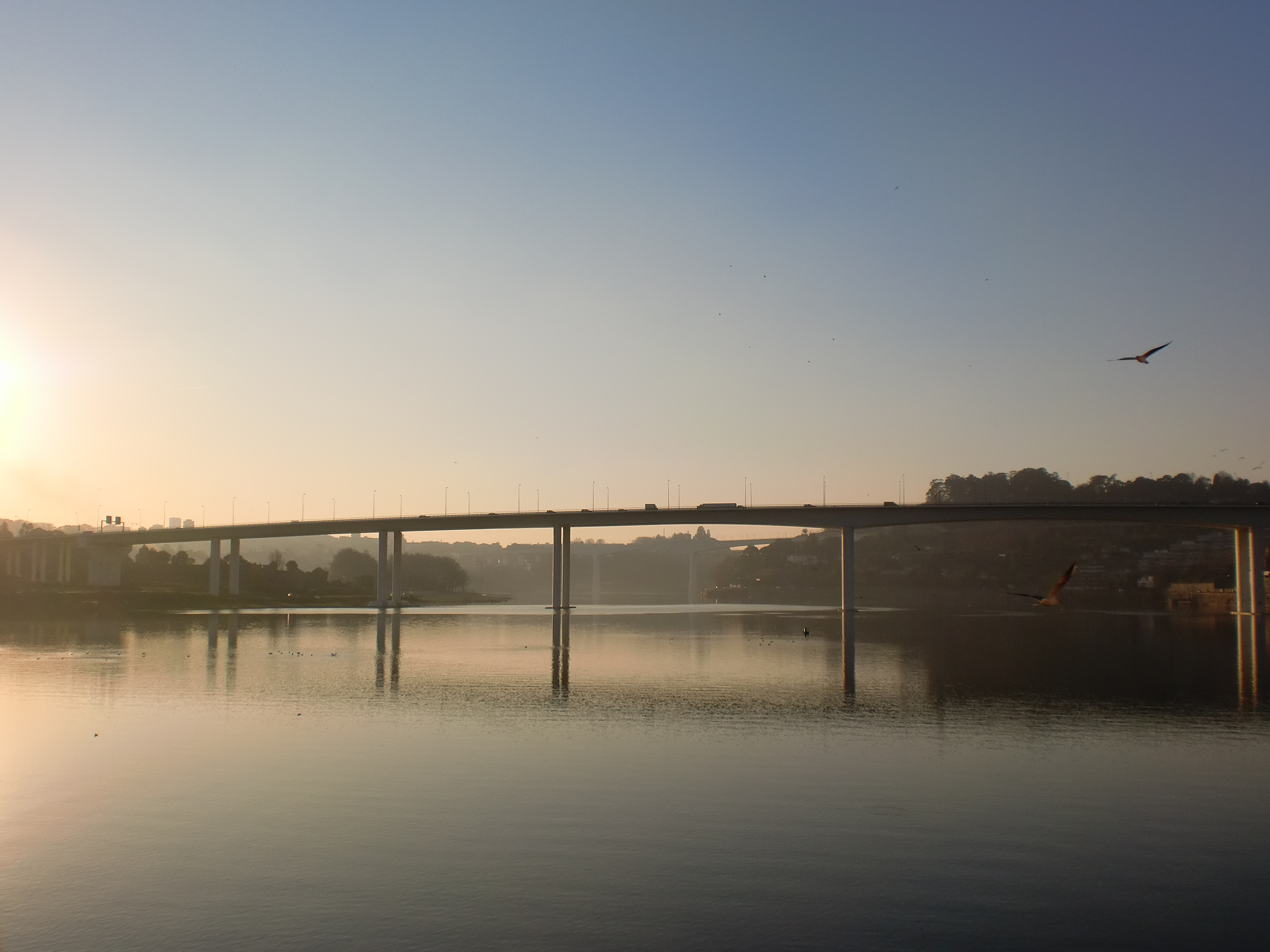
Ponte do Freixo (Porto)

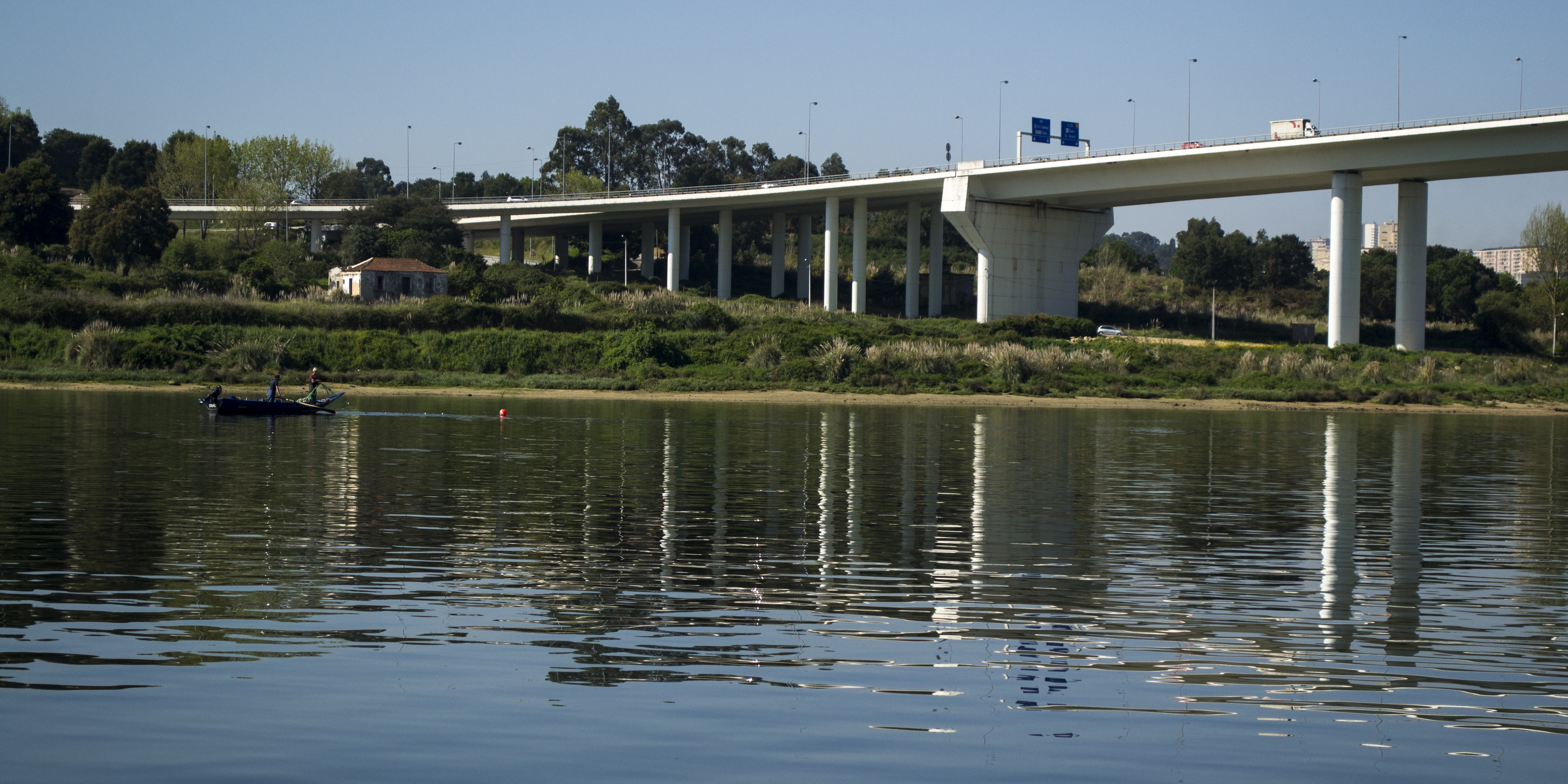
Ponte do Freixo (34011316175)

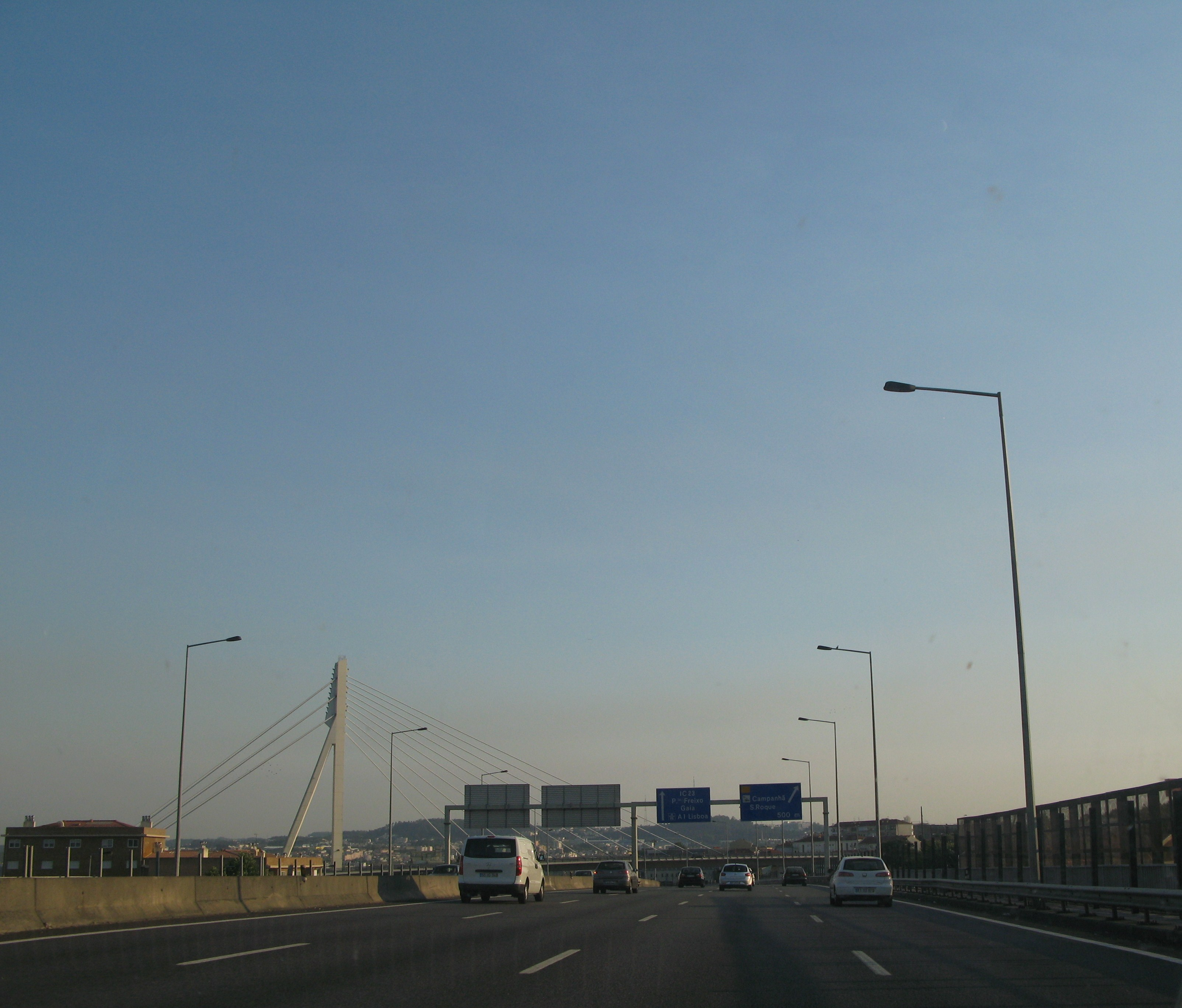
Trânsito na Ponte do Freixo

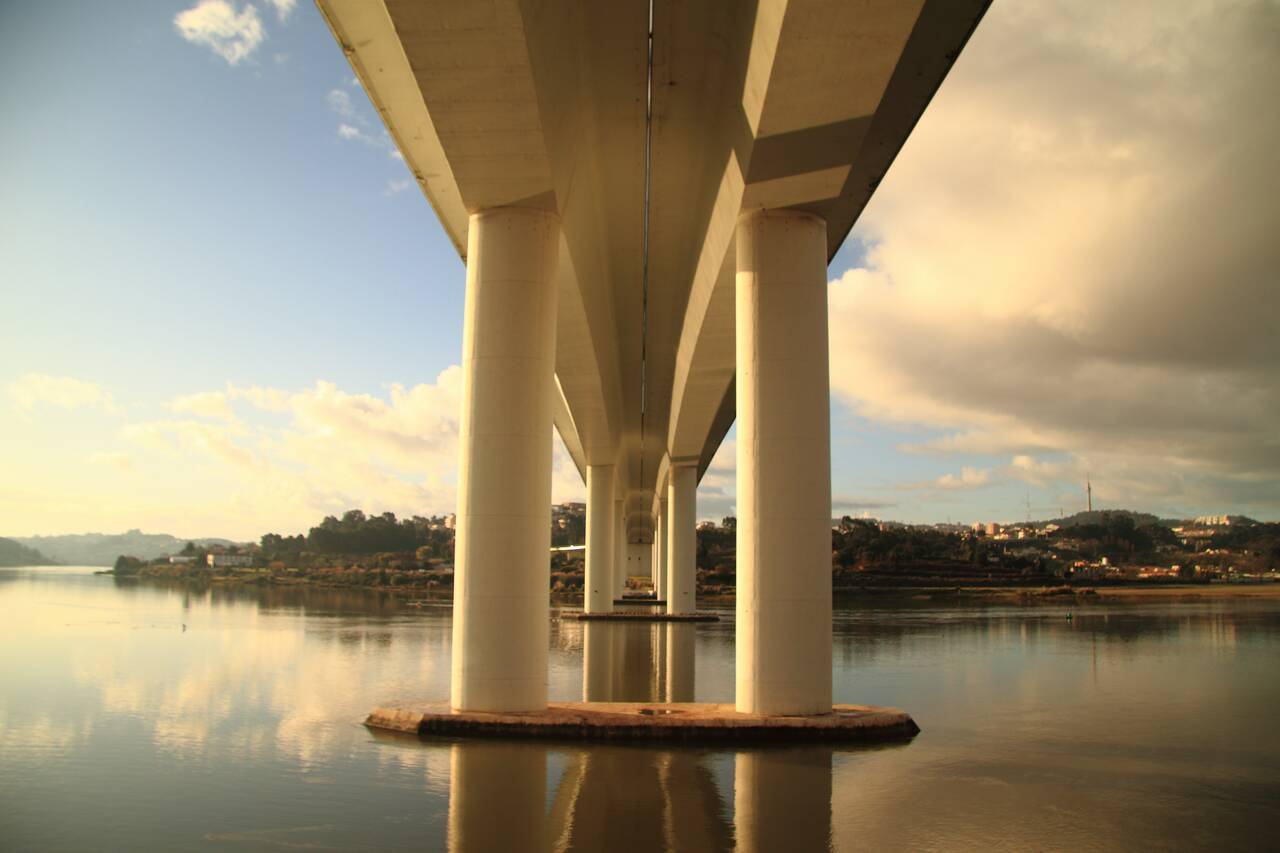
FrEixo (4386401013)

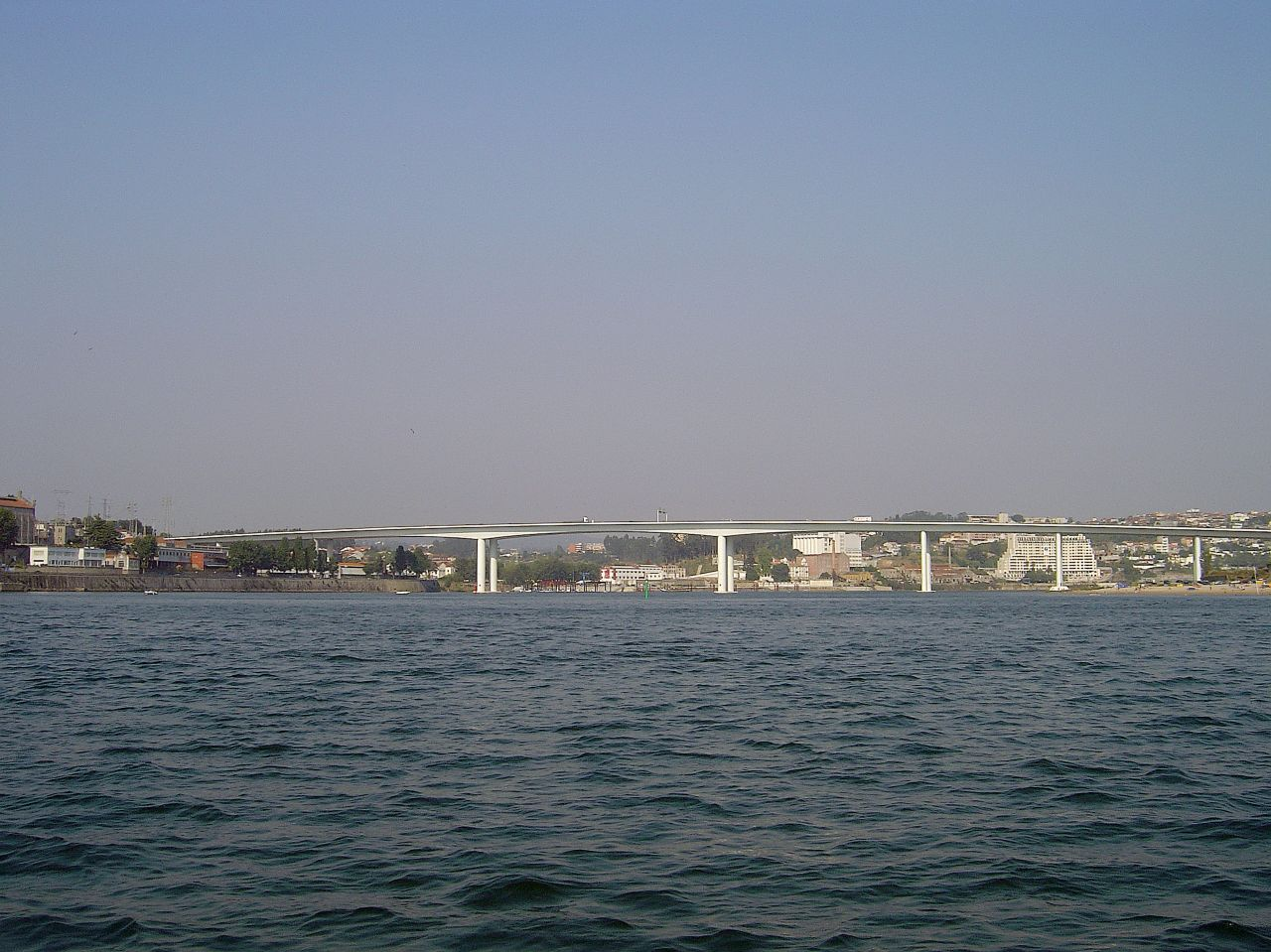
