= Infante Dom Henrique Bridge =

Infante Dom Henrique Bridge Ponte Infante Dom Henrique
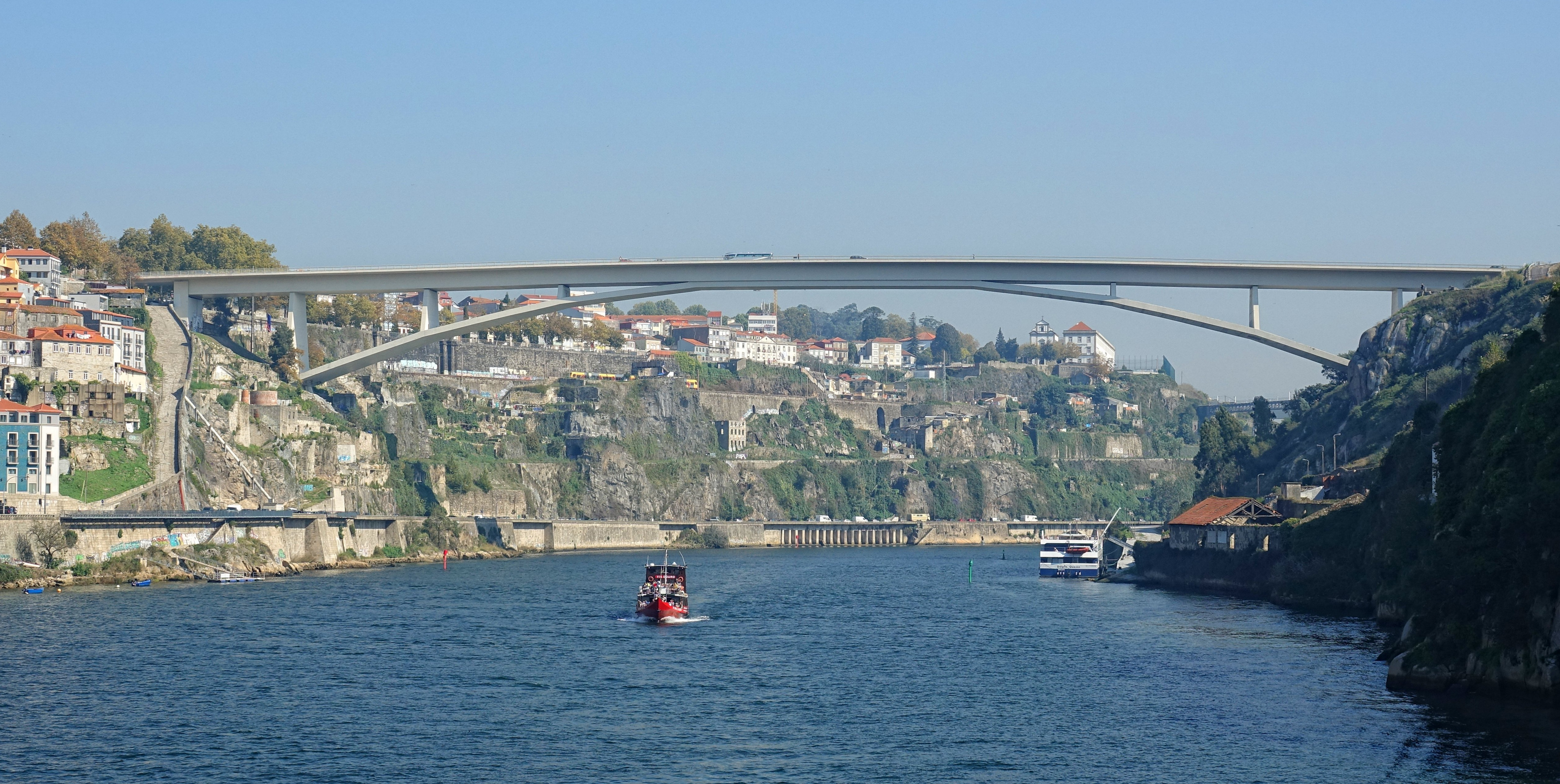
- Coordinates: 41°8′28″N 8°36′6″W
- Carries: Av. Dom João II
- Crosses: Rio Douro
- Locale: Porto, between the City of Porto proper and Vila Nova de Gaia
- Named for: Prince Henry the Navigator

Characteristics
- Design: Arch bridge
- Material: Reinforced concrete
- Total length: 371 metres (1,217 ft)
- Width: 20 metres (66 ft)
- Height: 75 metres (246 ft)
- Longest span: 280 metres (920 ft)

History
- Architect: Adão da Fonseca
- Engineering design by: IDEAM
- Opened: March 30, 2003

The Infante Dom Henrique Bridge (Portuguese: Ponte Infante Dom Henrique), commonly known as Infante Bridge (Portuguese: Ponte do Infante), is a road bridge across the Douro River in Greater Porto, Portugal. The bridge is upriver from the Dom Luís I Bridge and downriver from the Maria Pia Bridge.

Completed in 2003, the Infante Bridge carries vehicle and pedestrian traffic from Vila Nova de Gaia to Central Porto. The bridge was constructed as a replacement for the upper deck of the Dom Luís I Bridge that was closed to vehicle traffic in 2003 to allow for its conversion to the D Line of the Porto Metro.

The bridge has a total length of 371 metres (1,217 ft) and an arch span of 280 metres (920 ft). The bridge's height is 75 m (246 ft) above the Douro River, but the height of the arch is only 25 m (82 ft) above its foundations in the riverside cliffs. Inspired by the alpine Maillart bridges, the Infante Bridge's arch is one of the shallowest in the world as a ratio of rise from base over length.
