= Cerâmica de Valadares =

Cerâmica de Valadares is a Portuguese company which produces sanitary ware and ceramic fittings. Cerâmica de Valadares' factory is located in the parish of Valadares, in the city Vila Nova de Gaia and was founded on 25 April 1921.

== History ==
Cerâmica de Valadares was founded on 25 April 1921, started by producing minor ceramic products. During the first half of the 20th century it was an important factor of development of Valadares, attracting people from the interior of the country and developing small shops in the zones nearby. In the decade of 80, there was a big change in Cerâmica de Valadares' production; the factory started to invest only in sanitary ware and ceramic fittings for bathrooms. In 1993, there was produced the first ecological "water-saving" toilet in Portugal.

== Present Situation ==
Nowadays, this company produces per year, between 800000 and 900000 ceramic pieces, employs 560 workers and the factory occupies an area of 176000 square meters. It is the leading exporter of sanitary ware and ceramic fittings in Portugal (exporting 60% of the production), and among other countries, Cerâmica de Valadares exports to Spain, UAE, Saudi Arabia and South Africa. It is frequently present in several fairs about design's sanitary ware and ceramic fittings. Some of Cerâmica de Valadares' projects worldwide, include Palm Islands, in Dubai, the Basilica of the Holy Trinity, in Fátima, Dubai Sports city and Torre Sacyr-VallHermoso in Madrid, Spain. Recently Cerâmica de Valadares has won a Jury Mention in Tektónica08, a fair dedicated to innovation in construction materials. The majority of Valadares' products are certified by the Quality Institute of Portugal, German LGA, Dutch KIWA and British WRC.

== Cerâmica de Valadares and Valadares' coat of arms ==
Valadares' coat of arms has a vase with a dentate wheel behind. The vase with the dentate wheel represents the ceramic industry in Valadares, which is represented by the factory Cerâmica de Valadares,
