= Gulpilhares =

Former civil parish in Portugal

Coordinates: 41.079°N 8.652°W

Location of Gulpilhares in Vila Nova de Gaia.

Gulpilhares is a former civil parish in the municipality of Vila Nova de Gaia, Portugal. In 2013, the parish merged into the new parish Gulpilhares e Valadares. The population in 2011 was 11,341, in an area of 5.47 km². It includes Miramar, Francelos and other beaches.
