= Gulpilhares e Valadares =

- Civil parish
- Location in Portugal
- Coordinates: 41.09°N 8.64°W
- Country: Portugal
- Region: Norte
- Metropolitan area: Porto
- District: Porto
- Municipality: Vila Nova de Gaia

Area
  - Total: 10.61 km^{2} (4.10 sq mi)

Population (2011)
  - Total: 22,019
  - Density: 2,100/km^{2} (5,400/sq mi)
- Time zone: UTC+00:00 (WET)
  - Summer (DST): UTC+01:00 (WEST)

Gulpilhares e Valadares is a civil parish in the municipality of Vila Nova de Gaia, Portugal. It was formed in 2013 by the merger of the former parishes Gulpilhares and Valadares. The population in 2011 was 22,019, in an area of 10.61 km².
