= Theatre Eduardo Brazão =

- Cine-Teatro Eduardo Brazão
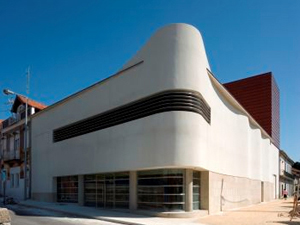
- Eduardo Brazão Cinema-Theatre, Portugal
- Interactive map of the Theatre Eduardo Brazão area

General information
- Type: Theatre
- Location: Gulpilhares e Valadares, Portugal
- Coordinates: 41°5′55.2″N 8°37′49.2″W
- Opened: 20th century
- Owner: Portuguese Republic

Design and construction
- Architect: Alexandre Marta da Cruz

The Theatre Eduardo Brazão (Portuguese: Cine-Teatro Eduardo Brazão) is a theatre in the civil parish of Gulpilhares e Valadares, in the municipality of Vila Nova de Gaia, in the Portuguese district of Porto.

== History ==
The theatre was inaugurated in 1928, a project of Alexandre Marta da Cruz, accompanied by its world premiere performance by the Companhia de Amélia Rey Colaço - Robles Monteiro. The original building was inspired by Odeon theatre in Porto.

Following work in the 1960s, the characteristics of the main hall were destroyed. But, these public works little helped the theatre, which was closed at the end of the 1970s.

By 1992, the building was already in a state of ruin and acquired by the municipal council of Vila Nova de Gaia. Beginning in the 2006s, reconstruction of the structure was undertaken, under the direction of Joaquim Massena.
