= Carvalhas =

- Civil parish
- Location in Portugal
- Coordinates: 41.470°N 8.590°W
- Country: Portugal
- Region: Norte
- Intermunic. comm.: Cávado
- District: Braga
- Municipality: Barcelos

Area
  - Total: 3.49 km^{2} (1.35 sq mi)

Population (2011)
  - Total: 691
  - Density: 200/km^{2} (510/sq mi)
- Time zone: UTC+00:00 (WET)
  - Summer (DST): UTC+01:00 (WEST)
- Website: http://www.carvalhas.maisbarcelos.pt/

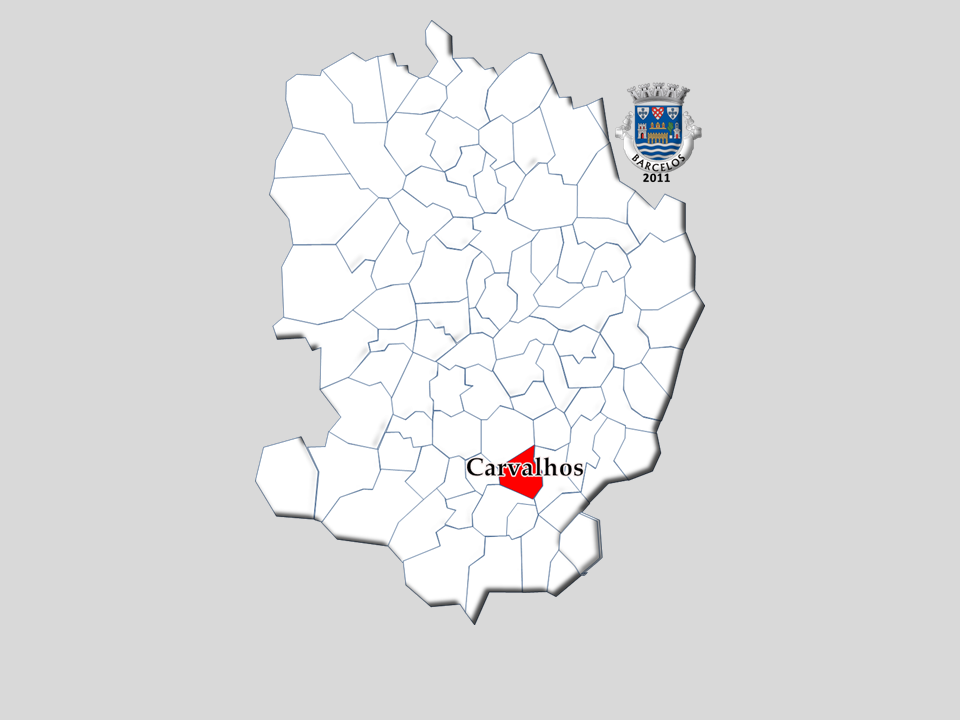
The location of Carvalhas in Barcelos, Portugal

Carvalhas is a Portuguese freguesia ("civil parish"), located in the municipality of Barcelos. The population as of 2011 was 691, in an area of 3.49 square kilometres (1.35 sq mi).
