= Santa Marinha (Vila Nova de Gaia) =

Coordinates: 41.140°N 8.641°W

Location of Santa Marinha in Vila Nova de Gaia.

Santa Marinha is a former civil parish in the municipality of Vila Nova de Gaia, Portugal. In 2013, the parish merged into the new parish Santa Marinha e São Pedro da Afurada. The population in 2011 was 30,146, in an area of 6.91 km².
