= Valadares (Vila Nova de Gaia) =

- Civil parish
- Coordinates: 41.100°N 8.640°W
- Country: Portugal
- Region: Norte
- Metropolitan area: Porto
- District: Porto
- Municipality: Vila Nova de Gaia

Government
  - Parish council president: José António Soares Ribeiro
  - Parish assembly president: Pedro Emanuel Silva Pinto de Sá

Area
  - Total: 5.14 km^{2} (1.98 sq mi)

Population (2011)
  - Total: 10,678
  - Density: 2,080/km^{2} (5,380/sq mi)
  - Registered electors (2025): 9,588
- Time zone: UTC+00:00 (WET)
  - Summer (DST): UTC+01:00 (WEST)
- Website: www.jf-valadares.pt

Valadares is a civil parish in the municipality of Vila Nova de Gaia, Portugal. In 2013, the parish merged into the new parish Gulpilhares e Valadares. Under Law No. 25-A/2025 of 13 March, Valadares was restored as a separate civil parish. Although the law entered into force on 14 March 2025, the restoration took effect when the newly elected local bodies were installed, on 4 November 2025. The population in 2011 was 10,678, in an area of 5.14 km^{2}.

Today the shoreside vicinity is very popular for its nightlife and the bars along its well-known beach. It is also possible to see some old sanatoriums used mostly in the 1940s and 1950s to treat people suffering from bone fractures and diseases like tuberculosis. The sanatoriums were established here because the region is extremely rich in iodine, valuable for its antiseptic uses in medicine.

Valadares is also very famous for Cerâmica de Valadares that today it is considered the biggest and most varied National Manufacture provider of sanitary ware and ceramic fittings. There is a train station.

== Coat of arms and flag ==
The coat of arms are made up of a ceramic vase on the center with a dentate wheel behind, on the left is maize and on the right a shield over the water, on the bottom is water. The flag has two white and two blue squares.

The ceramic vase with a dentate wheel represents the ceramic industry and the archaeological findings. The maize represents the fields in Vila Chá. The shield represents the shields of Vila Nova de Gaia coat of arms. The water represents the ocean and the beach of Valadares. The colors blue and white represent the ocean and foam of the waves.

== History ==
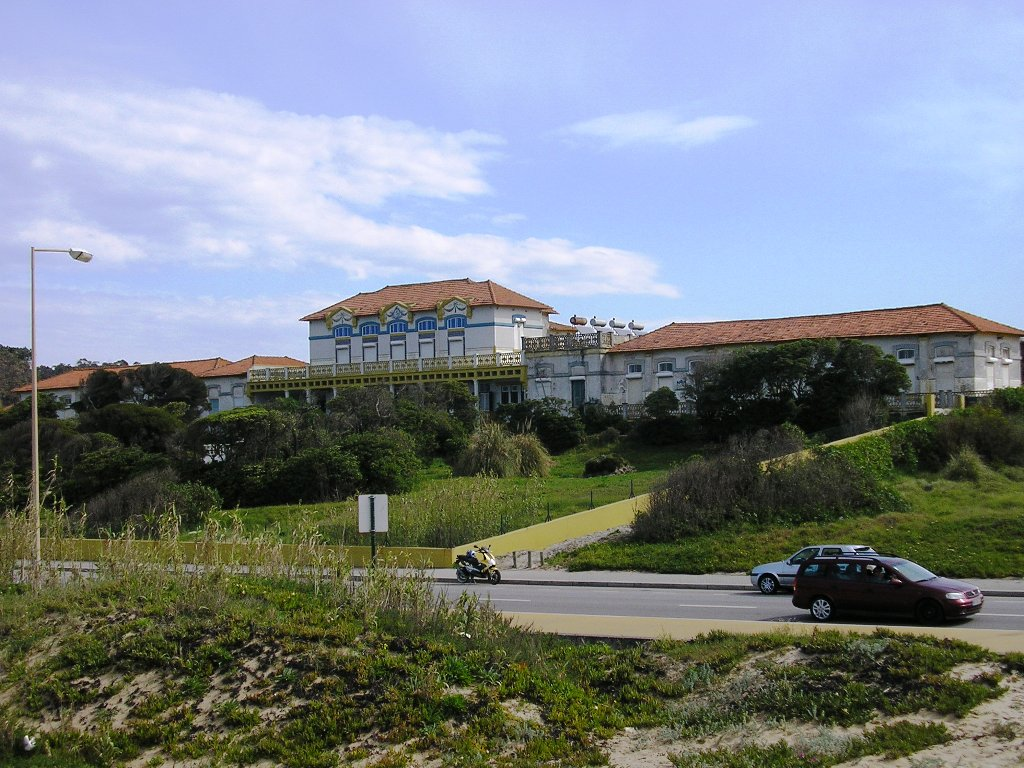
Sanatório Marítimo do Norte, in Valadares.

The name Valadares originates from the word "Vallado", that means obstacle. That may be the "Crasto de Valadares" a fortification from the second period of the Iron Age (450 b.C.). This "Crastos" on the northwest of Iberian Peninsula, goes from the 5th century B.C. to AD 5th century. In the Middle Ages, Valadares belonged to the Monastery of Grijó. During the first half of the 20th century, Valadares enjoyed a considerable development, being one of the most developed parishes of Gaia, due to the existence of the Cerâmica de Valadares, one important Train Station, Sanatoriums, several Schools and a theatre (Cine-teatro Eduardo Brazão).

== Local government ==
=== Democratic local government ===
Portugal's first democratic local elections were held on 12 December 1976.

Presidents of the Valadares parish council and assembly, 1976–2013
Term	Parish council president	Parish assembly president	Electoral list
1976–1979	Alberto Teixeira da Costa; Álvaro Tadeu dos Santos		PS
1979–1982	Clemente Teixeira da Silva	Miguel da Rocha Matos	AD
1982–1985	Manuel da Silva Ferreira	João Soares Ribeiro	PS
1985–1989	Cândido Victor de Oliveira	João Soares Ribeiro	PS
1989–1993	Cândido Victor de Oliveira; Aníbal José de Jesus Agostinho	Manuel Fernando Guedes	PS
1993–1997	Aníbal José de Jesus Agostinho		PS
1997–2001	Jorge Manuel da Silva Soares	José Manuel Pinto Soares	PPD/PSD.CDS-PP
2001–2005	Jorge Manuel da Silva Soares		PPD/PSD.CDS-PP
2005–2009	Jorge Manuel da Silva Soares		PPD/PSD.CDS-PP
2009–2013	Artur Manuel Sousa Soeiro Gandra		PS

=== Union with Gulpilhares, 2013–2025 ===
Valadares and Gulpilhares were merged in 2013 to form the civil parish of Gulpilhares e Valadares, under Law No. 11-A/2013 of 28 January. Alcino de Sousa Lopes headed the union's parish council for the three terms from 2013 to 2025. He was elected for the independent citizens' group MIGV in 2013 and for the Socialist Party (PS) in 2017 and 2021.

Presidents of the Gulpilhares e Valadares parish bodies, 2013–2025
Term	Parish council president	Parish assembly president	Electoral list
2013–2017	Alcino de Sousa Lopes	Cláudia Raquel Lopes da Silva	MIGV
2017–2021	Alcino de Sousa Lopes	António da Silva Ferreira	PS
2021–2025	Alcino de Sousa Lopes	Joaquim de Sousa Rocha	PS

=== Restoration and the 2025–2029 term ===
Under Law No. 25-A/2025 of 13 March, Valadares was restored as a separate civil parish. Although the law entered into force on 14 March 2025, the restoration took effect when the newly elected local bodies were installed, on 4 November 2025. The installation took place at the Cine-Teatro Eduardo Brazão.

For the 2025–2029 term, the parish council (Junta de Freguesia) is headed by José António Soares Ribeiro, while the parish assembly (Assembleia de Freguesia) is chaired by Pedro Emanuel Silva Pinto de Sá. Both were elected for the PPD/PSD.CDS-PP.IL coalition, Gaia Sempre na Frente.

Presidents of the Valadares parish bodies, 2025–2029
Term	Parish council president	Parish assembly president	Electoral coalition
2025–2029	José António Soares Ribeiro	Pedro Emanuel Silva Pinto de Sá	PPD/PSD.CDS-PP.IL — Gaia Sempre na Frente

The parish had 9,588 registered electors for the 2025 local elections, a separate measure from its census population.

== Culture ==
There is a traditional dessert in Valadares – the "Velhote", a kind of sweet bread with lemon and cinnamon. The origin of this dessert is not cleared yet, but most people believe that it was created in the 19th century by a lady who came from Braga. It is said that when King Carlos I and Queen Amélie went to Porto, they ate "Velhotes".

The patron of Valadares is S. Salvador.

== Media ==
=== Newspapers ===
- Valadares & a Cidade em Foco

== Places ==
Valadares is divided in 13 places.

- Aldeia
- Barroco
- Campolinho
- Crasto
- Chamorra
- Estação
- Pedreiras
- Penedo
- Praia de Valadares
- Sameiros
- Tartumil
- Valadarinhos
- Vila-Chã
