= Arrábida Bridge =

Bridge in Portugal

Arrábida Bridge Ponte de Arrábida
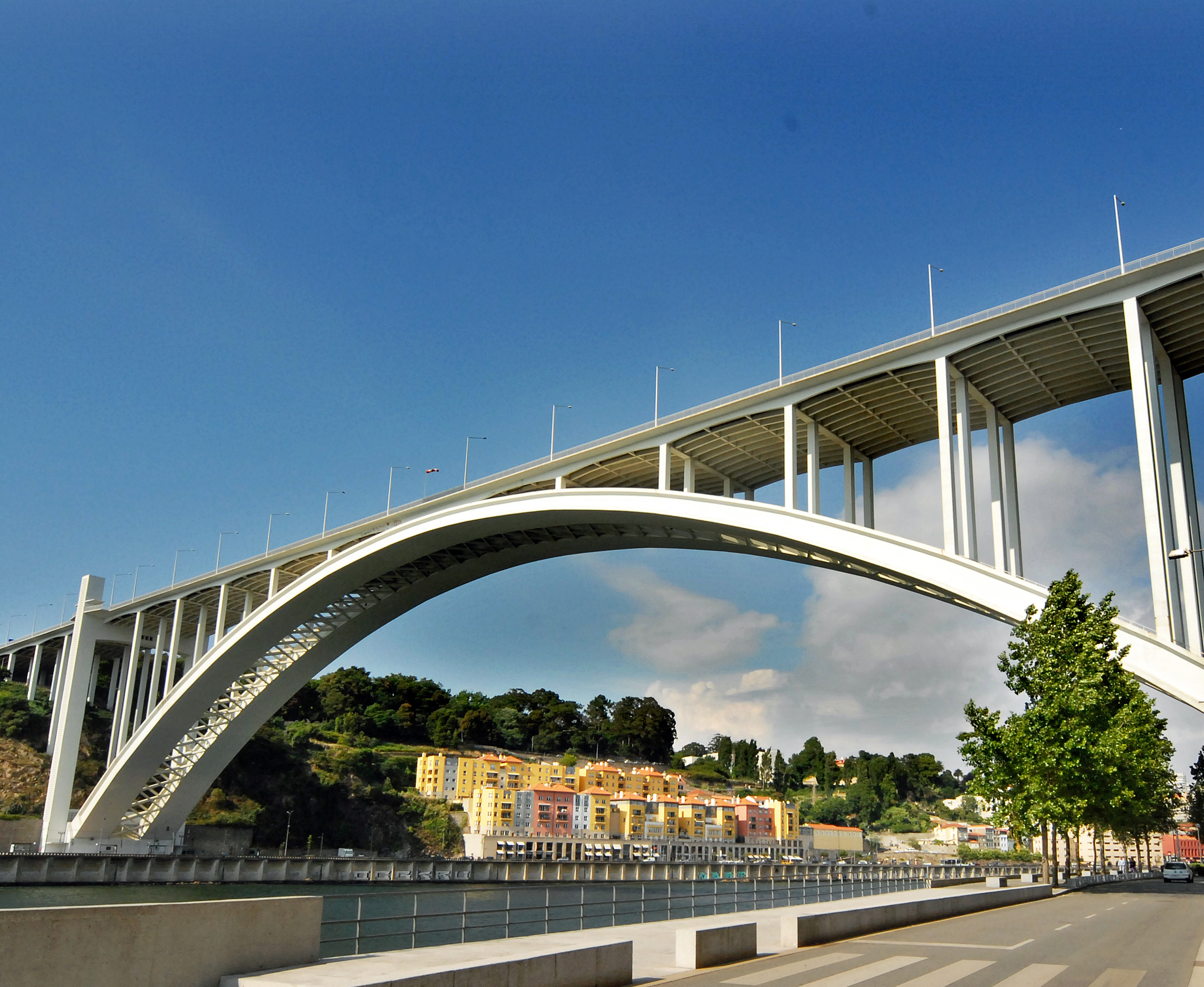
- A view of the bridge as seen of the southern margin of Vila Nova de Gaia near the mouth of the Douro River
- Coordinates: 41.147558°N 8.640343°W
- Carries: General traffic; pedestrian transit
- Crosses: Rio Douro
- Locale: Porto, between the City of Porto proper and Vila Nova de Gaia
- Official name: Ponte da Arrábida
- Other name(s): Arrábida Highway Bridge
- Named for: Arrábida escarpment
- Heritage status: National Monument; Monumento Nacional, Decree 13/2013, Diário da República, Série 1, 119 (24 junho 2013)
- SIPA Identification: IPA.00005507/PT011312070105

Characteristics
- Design: Arch bridge
- Material: Reinforced concrete
- Trough construction: Asphalt
- Pier construction: Iron
- Total length: 493.2 metres (1,618 ft)
- Width: 26.5 metres (87 ft)
- Height: 70 metres (230 ft)
- Longest span: 270 metres (890 ft)
- No. of lanes: 6 vehicular; 2 pedestrian

History
- Designer: Edgar António Mesquita Cardoso
- Construction start: May 1957
- Construction end: June 1963
- Construction cost: 126 million escudos
- Opened: 22 June 1963
- Inaugurated: 22 June 1963

The Arrábida Bridge is an arch bridge of reinforced concrete which carries six lanes of traffic over the Douro River, between Porto and Vila Nova de Gaia, in the Norte region of Portugal.

== History ==
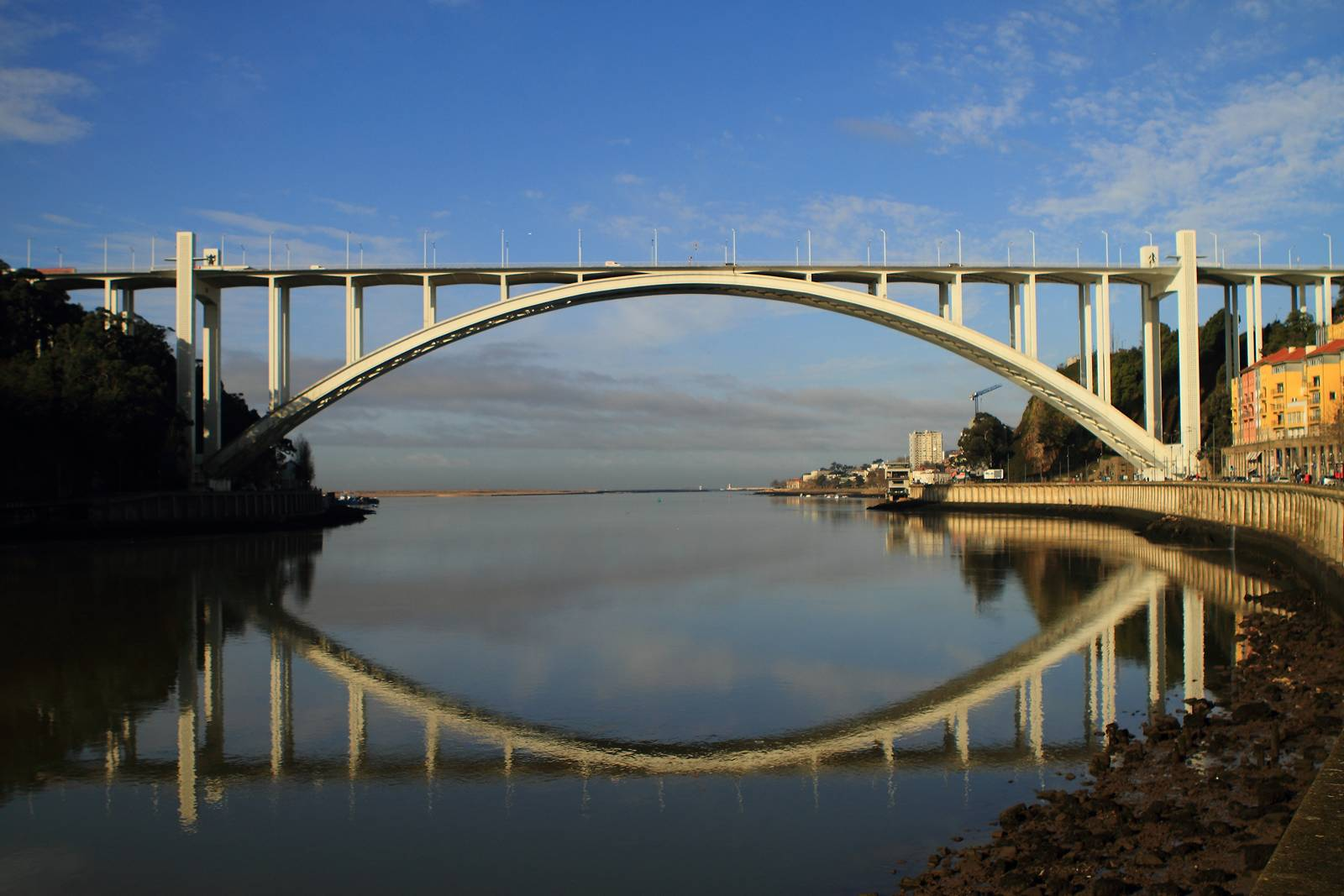
The symmetrical bridge as seen from the Douro River

In March 1952, a preliminary project for a roadway bridge was adjudicated to Professor Edgar António Mesquita Cardoso, by the JAE. It was approved in 1955.

The construction of the bridge proceeded in May 1957. By decree 42/234, dated 22 April 1959, the Ministério das Obras Públicas (Public Works Ministry) promoted, through their respective City Councils, the construction of modest dwellings for the accommodation of families who needed to be demolished, as a result of the construction of access to the bridge. By 22 June 1963, the bridge was concluded and inaugurated. At the time of its completion, the bridge's main span of 270 metres (890 ft) was the largest of any concrete-arch bridge in the world.

In the 1990s, the elevators on the bridge were deactivated.

A process to classify the bridge began on 16 February 2011. An announcement was issued on 18 September 2012 (13409/2012) on the project to classify the bridge as a Monumento Nacional (National Monument), establishing its respective Special protection Zone.

On 24 June 2016, a tourist experience that allowed pedestrians to walk across the archway, an idea of Pedro Pardinhas, who invested 50,000 euros and safety equipment and transformation of a small annex as the reception hall for "Porto Bridge Climb".

== Architecture ==
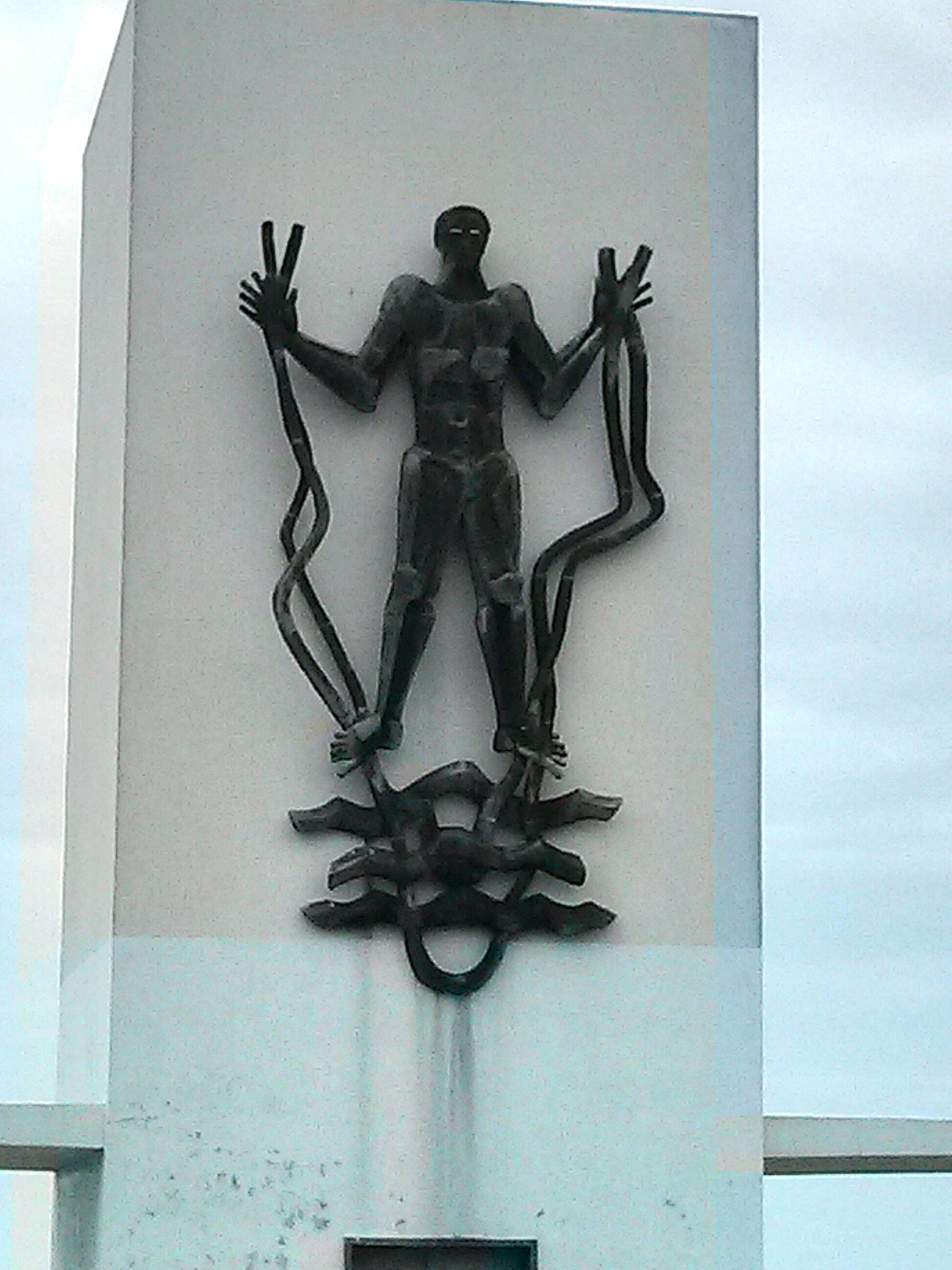
A look at one of the bronze statues on the larger pillars

The bridge is isolated over the Douro river, supported over the northern margin along the Arrábida escarpment and along the southern margin at ravine in the area of Candal. It is implanted downstream from the D. Luís Bridge, and is the closest to the mouth of the Douro River, establishing a connection between the IC1 (in Vila Nova de Gaia) and Porto beltway (VCI).

The structure is an iron, archway bridge, constructed of reinforced concrete, asphalt deck. The deck is supported by a dual archway, united by corner narrow elements in concrete crosses. There are 76 pillars, with the largest four located near the main supports, near the massive rectangular columns, with smaller pillars regularly spaced along the exterior surfaces. These larger columns have elevators that link the deck level to the marginal roadway along the Douro. The elevator volumes, facing the interior of the bridge, include addorsed sculptures. The deck includes six lines of traffic for vehicular traffic (part of the European route E01 system) and two narrower lines for pedestrian passage.

The total length of the deck is 493.2 metres (1,618 ft) with a width of 26.5 metres (87 ft) The arch has a rise of 52 metres (171 ft), and the maximum clearance above river level is 70 metres (230 ft) above the Douro. The cost of construction was 126 million escudos.
