= Resende (surname) =

Resende or Rezende (the latter is an archaic spelling in Portugal, but contemporary in Brazil and India) is a Portuguese surname.

Notable people with the surname include:

== Resende ==
- Mauricio Resende (born 1955), Brazilian-American research scientist
- Nuno Resende (born 1973), Portuguese singer
- Ricardo Resende (born 1984), Brazilian football coach

== Rezende ==
- Ana Rezende (born 1983), Brazilian film director and keyboard/guitar player
- Antônio Alberto Guimarães Rezende (1926–2015), Brazilian Roman Catholic bishop
- Arthur Rodrigues Rezende (born 1994), Brazilian footballer
- Bernardo Rezende (born 1959), Brazilian volleyball player and coach
- Bruno Rezende (born 1986), Brazilian volleyball player
- Calvin Rezende (born 1993), American soccer player
- Daniel Rezende (born 1975), Brazilian film editor and director
- Daniel Rezende Xavier (born 1982), Brazilian archer
- Denis Neves Rezende da Silva (born 1990), Brazilian footballer
- Gílson Domingos Rezende Agostinho (born 1977), Brazilian footballer
- Iris Rezende (born 1933), Brazilian politician
- José Rezende Filho (1929–1977), Brazilian writer
- Luciano Rezende (archer) (born 1978), Brazilian Paralympic archer
- Manoel Rezende de Mattos Cabral, also known as Nelinho, (born 1950), Brazilian footballer
- Marcelo Rezende (1951–2017), Brazilian journalist and television presenter
- Marisa Rezende (born 1944), Brazilian music educator and composer
- Marlon Rezende Emídio Costa (born 1995), Portuguese footballer
- Mônica Rezende (born 1969), Brazilian swimmer
- Nico Rezende, Brazilian singer, composer and musical arranger
- Renato Rezende (born 1991), Brazilian racing cyclist
- Roberto de Sousa Rezende (born 1985), Brazilian footballer
- Sérgio Rezende (born 1951), Brazilian filmmaker
- Tiago Marques Rezende (born 1988), Brazilian footballer
- Tulio Rezende (born 2004), Brazilian politician
- Welberth Rezende (born 1975), Brazilian politician
- Rezende (footballer) (born 1995), Brazilian footballer

== See also ==
- Resende
- Rezendes, another surname
- Reséndiz, Spanish variant
