= Resende =

Resende may refer to:

== Places ==
- Resende, Rio de Janeiro, a municipality in the State of Rio de Janeiro, Brazil
- Resende, Portugal, a municipality in the district of Viseu, Portugal
- Resende (parish), a civil parish in the municipality of Resende, Portugal
- Resende (Paredes de Coura), a civil parish in the municipality of Paredes de Coura, Portugal

== Other ==
- Resende Nuclear Fuel Factory
- Resende Futebol Clube, Brazilian football club
- Resende (footballer), Brazilian footballer
- Resende (surname), a Portuguese surname

== See also ==
- Nova Resende, a municipality in the State of Minas Gerais
