= Rezendes =

Rezendes is a surname. Notable people with the surname include:

- Dave Rezendes (born 1959), American NASCAR driver
- Michael Rezendes, American journalist

== See also ==
- Resendes
- Resende (surname)
