= Seyrig =

Seyrig is a surname. Notable people with this surname include:

- Delphine Seyrig (1932–1990), Lebanese-born French actress and film director
- Francis Seyrig (1927-1979), French composer
- Henri Seyrig (1895–1973), French archaeologist, numismatist, and historian of antiquities
- Théophile Seyrig (1843–1923), German engineer, best known for designing bridges
