= Resende Municipality =

Resende Municipality may refer to:

- Resende Municipality, Portugal
- Resende, Rio de Janeiro (municipality)
