= Felgueiras (disambiguation) =

Felgueiras is a town and a municipality in Portugal. It may also refer to the following places and organisations in Portugal:

- Felgueiras (Fafe), a civil parish in the municipality of Fafe
- Felgueiras (Resende), a civil parish in the municipality of Resende
- Felgueiras (Torre de Moncorvo), a civil parish in the municipality of Torre de Moncorvo
- FC Felgueiras, an association football club in Portugal.
