= Maria Pia Bridge =

Maria Pia Bridge Ponte Maria Pia
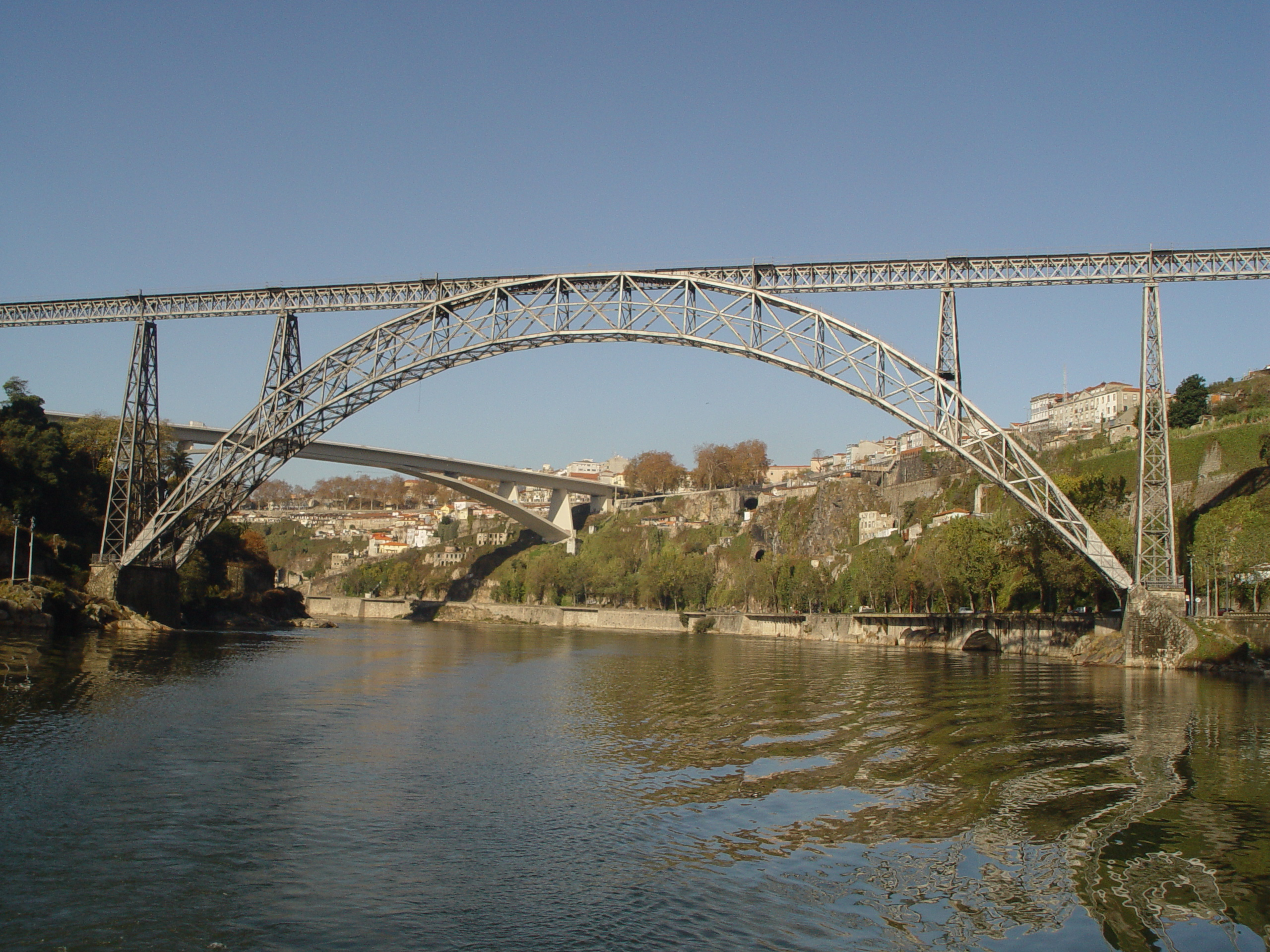
- Maria Pia Bridge, Porto, Portugal
- Coordinates: 41°08′23″N 8°35′50″W
- Carries: No longer in use
- Crosses: River Douro
- Locale: Porto/Vila Nova de Gaia, Portugal
- Official name: Ponte Maria Pia
- Other name: Ponte de Dona Maria Pia
- Named for: Maria Pia of Savoy
- Heritage status: National Monument; Monumento Nacional; Decree 28/82, Diário da República, Série 1, 47, 26 February 1982

Characteristics
- Material: Wrought iron
- Total length: 353 metres (1,158 ft)
- Height: 60 metres (200 ft)
- Longest span: 160m (525 ft)

History
- Engineering design by: Gustave Eiffel; Théophile Seyrig; Manuel Afonso Espergueira; Pedro Inácio Lopes
- Constructed by: Eiffel & Cª. de Paris
- Construction start: 5 January 1876
- Construction end: 1 October 1877
- Inaugurated: 4 November 1877
- Closed: 1991

Location
- Interactive map of Maria Pia Bridge

Maria Pia Bridge (Portuguese: Ponte Maria Pia), commonly known as Dona Maria Pia Bridge (Ponte de Dona Maria Pia), is a railway bridge built in 1877 and attributed to Gustave Eiffel. It is situated between the Portuguese Northern municipalities of Porto and Vila Nova de Gaia.

The double-hinged, crescent arch bridge is made of wrought iron and spans 353 m (1,158 ft), 60 m (200 ft) over the Douro River. It was part of the Linha Norte system of the national railway. At the time of its construction, it was the longest single-arch span in the world. It is no longer used for rail transport, having been replaced by Ponte de São João (or St. John's Bridge) in 1991. It is often confused with the similar Luiz I Bridge, which was built nine years later and is located 1 kilometre (0.62 mi) to the west, although the D. Luis Bridge has two decks instead of one.

== History ==
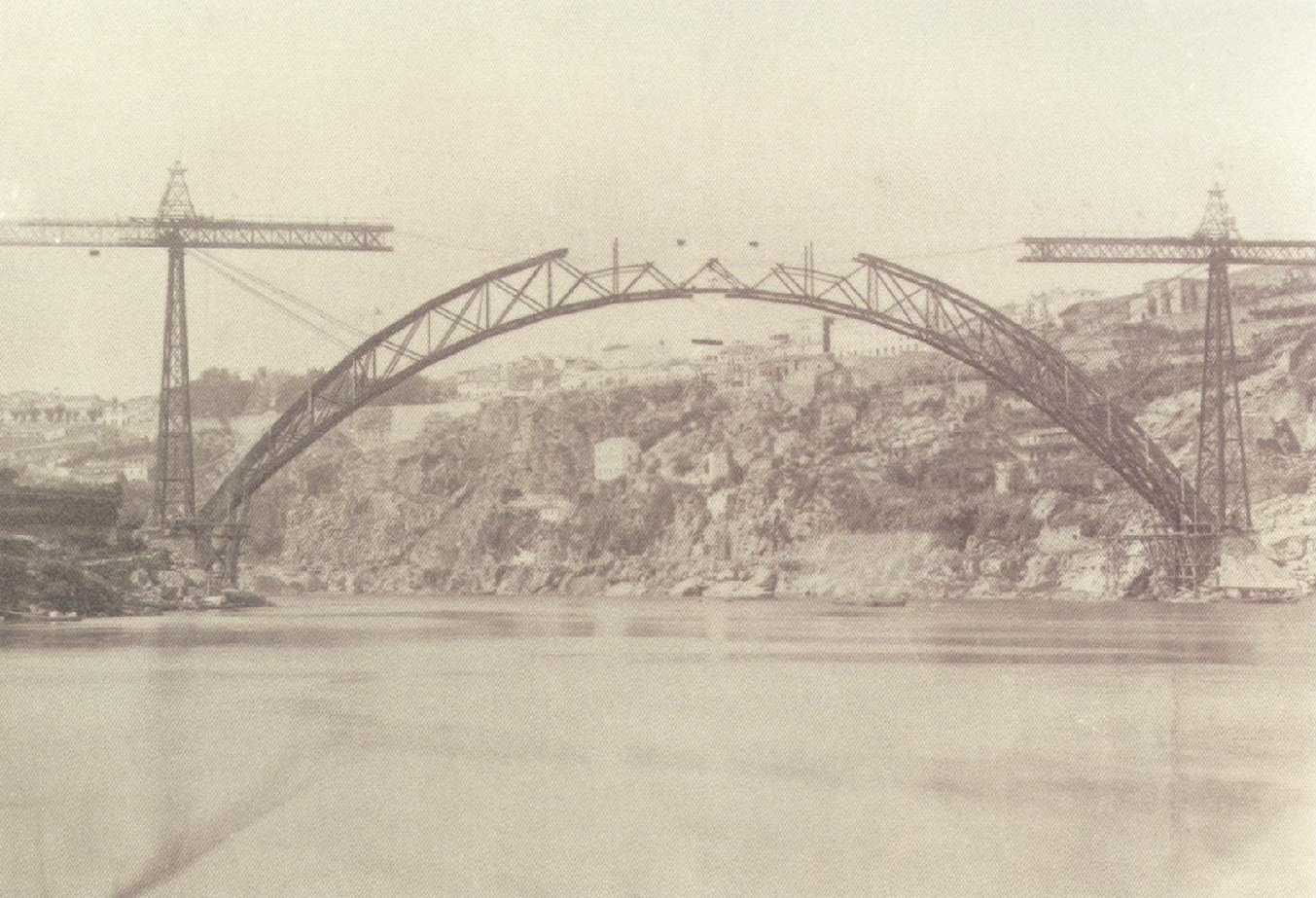
The Maria Pia Bridge during construction: the two halves of the arch have been connected, but their weight is still supported by cables.

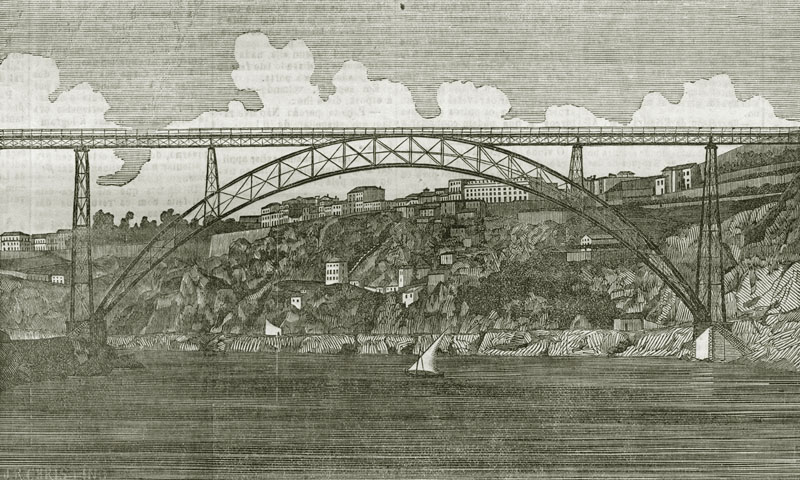
A view of the Maria Pia Bridge in 1877

In 1875, the Royal Portuguese Railway Company announced a competition for a bridge to carry the Lisbon to Porto railway across the river Douro. This was very technically demanding: the river was fast-flowing, its depth could be as much as 20 m (66 ft) during times of flooding, and the riverbed was made up of a deep layer of gravel. These factors ruled out the construction of piers in the river, meaning that the bridge would have to have a central span of 160m (525 ft). At the time, the longest span of an arch bridge was the 158.5m (520 ft) span of the bridge built by James B. Eads over the Mississippi at St Louis. When the project was approved, João Crisóstomo de Abreu e Sousa, member of the Junta Consultiva das Obras Públicas (Consultative Junta for Public Works), thought that the deck should have two tracks.

Gustave Eiffel's design proposal, priced at 965,000 French francs, was the least expensive of the four designs considered, at around two-thirds the cost of the nearest competitor. Since the company was relatively inexperienced, a commission was appointed to report on their suitability to undertake the work. Their report was favorable, although it did emphasise the difficulty of the project:

"The complete study of a structure of this size presents great difficulties. The methods of calculation known up until now can only be applied in practise with the aid of hypotheses which depart from established fact to a greater or lesser extent, and thus render the projected results uncertain."

Responsibility for the actual design is difficult to attribute, but it is likely that Théophile Seyrig, Eiffel's business partner who presented a paper on the bridge to the Société des Ingénieurs Civils in 1878, was largely responsible. In his account of the bridge that accompanied the 1:50 scale model exhibited at the 1878 World's Fair, Eiffel credited Seyrig and Henry de Dion with work on the calculations and drawings.

Construction started on 5 January 1876. Work on the abutments, piers, and approach decking was complete by September. Work then paused due to winter flooding, and the erection of the central arch span was not re-started until March 1877. By 28 October 1877, the platform was mounted and concluded, with the work on the 1,500 tonnes (3,300,000 lb) bridge finishing on 30 October 1878. Tests were performed between 1 and 2 November, leading to the 4 November inauguration by King D. Louis I and Queen Maria Pia of Savoy (the eponym of the bridge).

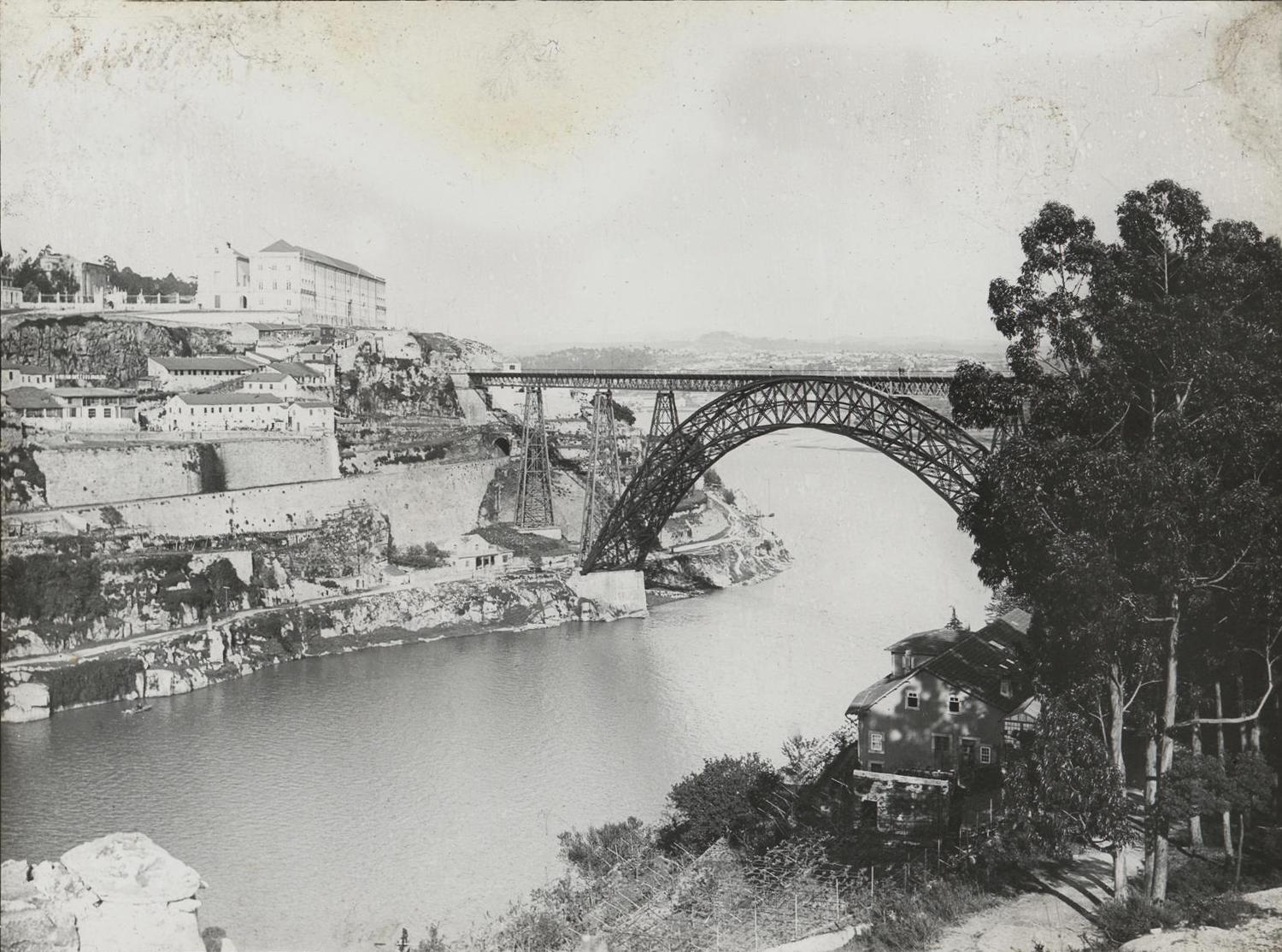
Another view between 1900 and 1910, showing the anchorages in cliffside of Seminário

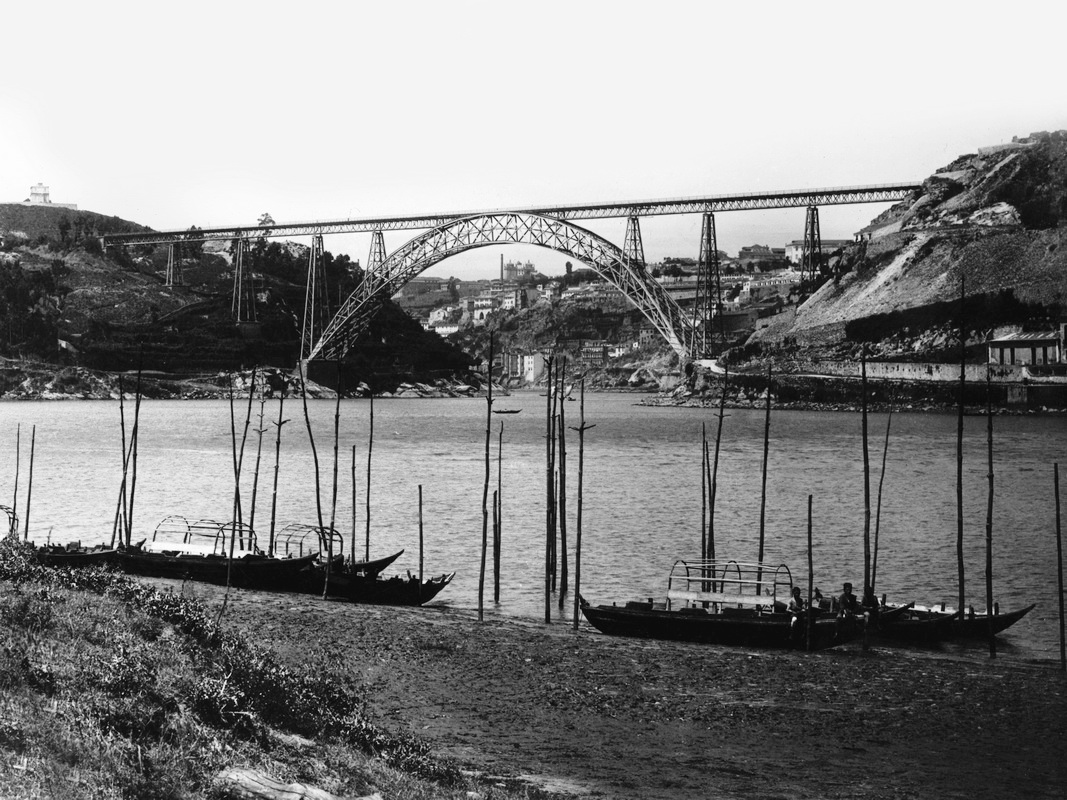
The boats along the river in sight of the Maria Pia

Between 1897 and 1898 there was some concern by technicians about the integrity of the bridge; its 3.1 metres (10 ft) width, the interruption of principal beams, its lightweight structure, and its elastic nature. In 1890, in Ovar, the Oficina de Obras Metálicas (Metal Works Office) was created to support the work to reinforce and repair those structures. As a consequence, restrictions were placed on transit over the structure between 1900 and 1906: axle load was limited to 14 tons and velocity to 10 kilometres (6.2 mi) per hour. Alterations to the deck of the bridge were performed under the oversight of Xavier Cordeiro in 1900. These were followed between 1901 and 1906 by improvements to the triangular beams, which were performed by the Oficina of Ovar. Consulting with a specialist in metallic structures, French engineer Manet Rabut, in 1907, the Oficina concluded that the arch and the works performed on the bridge were sufficient to allow circulation. This did not impede further work on the fore- and aft-structural members to make the bridge more accessible and to reinforce the main pillars.

In 1916, a commission was created to study the possibility of a secondary transit between Vila Nova de Gaia and Porto. In 1928, the bridge was noted as "a real obstacle to traffic."

In order to improve the structure for the beginning of CP service across the bridge with improved Series 070 locomotives on 1 November 1950, engineer João de Lemos executed several studies in 1948 to evaluate the bridge's condition: a study of the deck (including structural members) and analyses of the continuous beams and the arch's structural supports. The analysis of the stability of the bridge, handled by the Laboratório Nacional de Engenharia Civil (LNEC), resulted in the injection of cement and repair of the masonry joints and pillars that connected with metallic structures. At the same time, the repair team removed flaking paint from the structure and treated corrosion, including repainting with new metallic paint.

Another analytic study in 1966 began to analyze upgrading service to electrical locomotives (Bò-Bó), leading to the conclusion of the electrification of the Linha Norte. In 1969, in loco stress tests verified the analytical results.

In 1990, the bridge was classified by the American Society of Civil Engineers as an International Historic Civil Engineering Landmark.

In 1991, rail service over the bridge ended because the single track and speed restrictions limited transit to 20 kilometres (12 mi) per hour. Rail functions transitioned to the São João Bridge (designed by engineer Edgar Cardoso).

In 1998, there was a plan to rehabilitate and illuminate the bridge, resulting in the establishment of a tourist train attraction between the Museu dos Transportes and the area that included the wine cellars of Porto, a 1.8 kilometres (1.1 mi) route using a formerly closed tunnel under the historic centre of Porto.

In 2013, there was an effort to relocate the bridge to the city centre where it would serve as a monument.

== Architecture ==
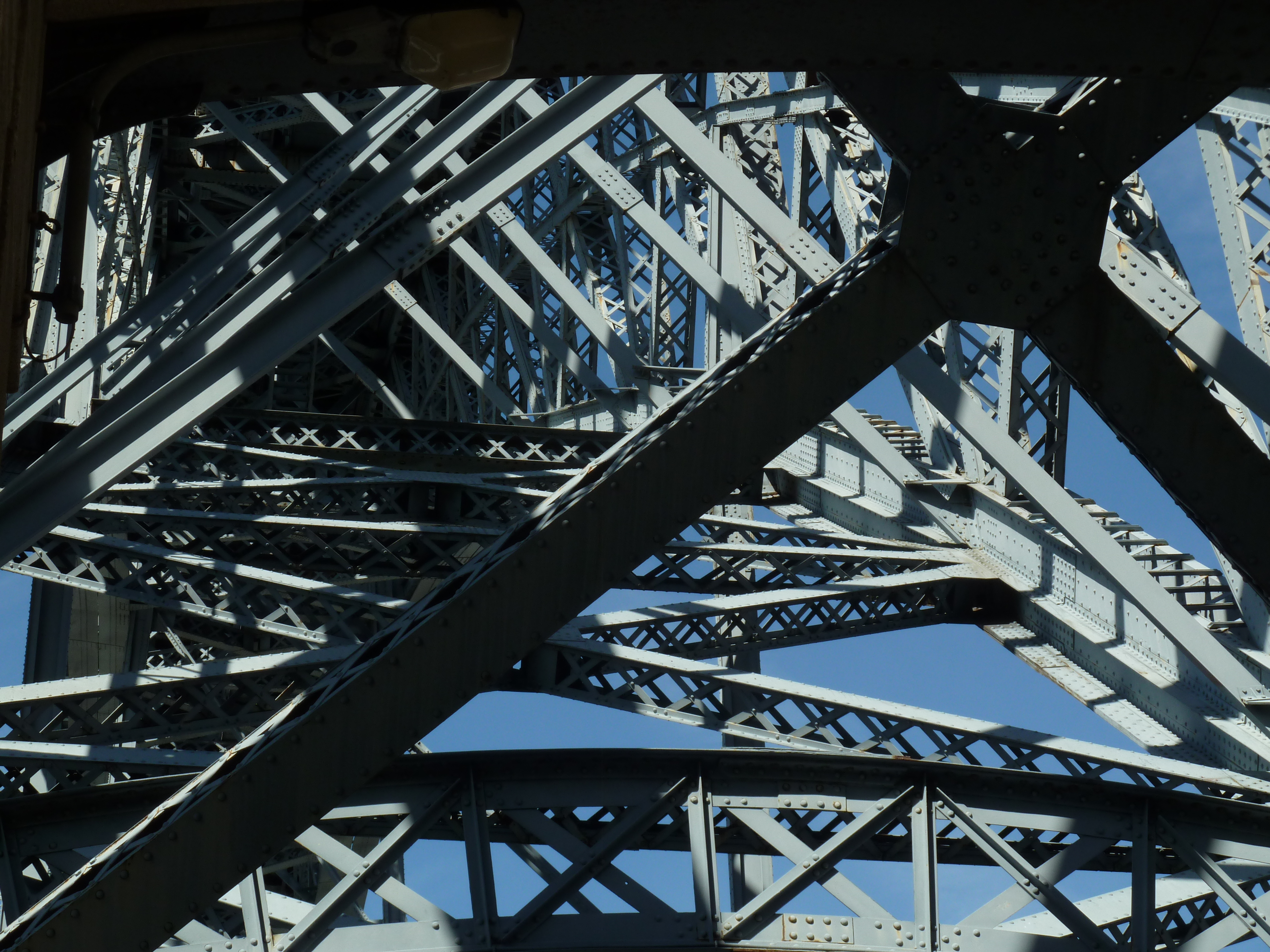

The bridge is in an urban cityscape over the Douro River, connecting the mount of Seminário in the municipality of Porto to the Serra do Pilar in the lightly populated section of the municipality of Vila Nova de Gaia.

The structure consists of a deck 354.375 m (1,162.65 ft) long, supported by two piers on one side of the river and three on the other, with a central arch with a span of 160 m (520 ft) and a rise of 42.6 m (140 ft). It is supported on three pillars in Vila Nova da Gaia and by two pillars in Porto. Two shorter pillars support the arch. The five interlaced support pillars are constructed in a pyramidal format over granite masonry blocks, over six veins, three of which are 37.390 metres (122.67 ft) on the Gaia side and 37.400 metres (122.70 ft) on the Porto side.

Over the bridge are painted ironwork guardrails over granite masonry.

Another innovation was the method of construction used for the central arch. Since it was impossible to use any falsework, the arch was built out from the abutments on either side, their weight being supported by steel cables attached to the top of the piers supporting the deck. The same method was also used to build the decking, temporary tower structures built above deck level to support the cables. This technique had been previously used by Eads, but its use by Eiffel shows his adoption of the latest engineering techniques.

The design uses a parabolic arch.
