= Tulio =

Tulio is a male given name of Latin origin (originally Tullius), which means "the one who leads". It is a fairly common given name in Spanish-speaking countries. Other popular forms are Tullio (Italian) and Túlio (Portuguese).

== Given name or nickname ==
- Tulio Demicheli, Argentine film director
- Tulio Botero, Colombian ecclesiastic of the Catholic Church
- Tulio Halperín Donghi (1926–2014), Argentine historian
- Tulio Larrínaga (1847-1917), Resident Commissioner of Puerto Rico
- Túlio Maravilha (born 1969), Brazilian footballer
- Túlio de Melo (born 1985), Brazilian footballer
- Túlio Lustosa Seixas Pinheiro (born 1976), Brazilian footballer also known as Túlio
- Tulio Rezende (born 2004), Brazilian politician
- Túlio Souza (born 1983), Brazilian footballer
- Marcus Tulio Tanaka, Japanese international footballer known as "Tulio"

== Surname ==
- Marco Tulio (born 1981), Brazilian footballer
- Teuvo Tulio (1912-2000), Finnish film director and actor born Theodor Tugai

== Fictional characters ==
- Tulio, a protagonist in the animated film The Road to El Dorado
- Tulio, a character in the animated film Rio
- Tulio Triviño Tufillo, a character in the Chilean television show 31 minutos

== See also ==
- Tullius
- Tullio (disambiguation)
