= Felgueiras (Resende) =

- Civil Parish
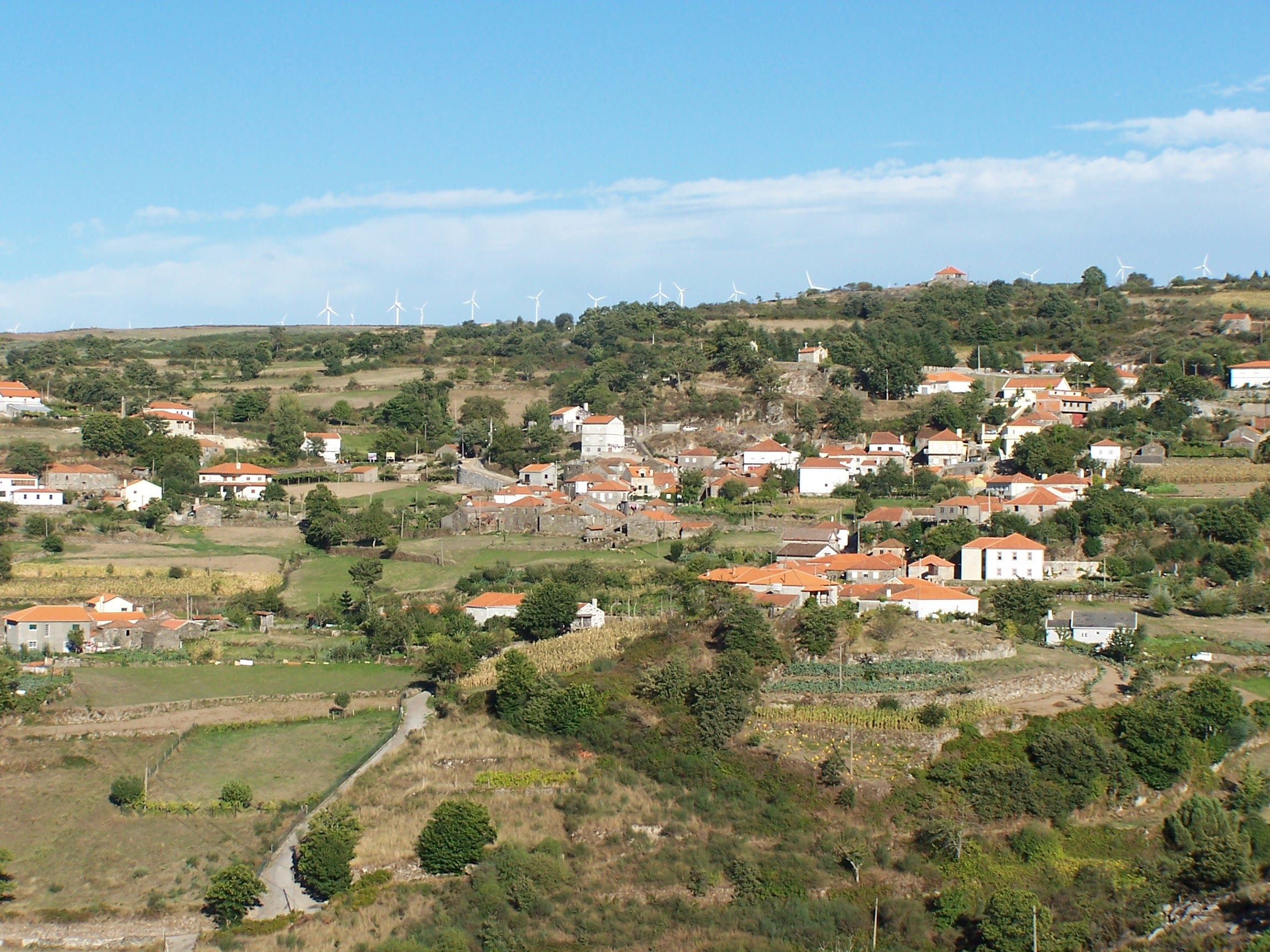
- The parish of Felgueiras, with the wind farm peaking out from the escarpment

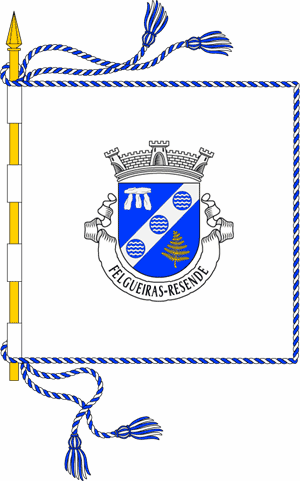
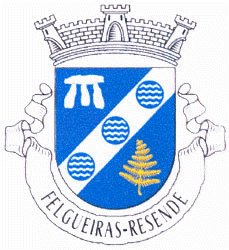
- Flag Coat of arms
- Interactive map of Felgueiras
- Coordinates: 41°3′11″N 7°56′13″W
- Country: Portugal
- Region: Norte
- Subregion: Tâmega
- District: Viseu
- Municipality: Resende
- Localities: Beirós, Felgueiras, Pimeirol, Ferrós

Area
  - Total: 8.4 km^{2} (3.2 sq mi)
- Elevation: 1,050 m (3,440 ft)

Population (2001)
  - Total: 315
  - Density: 38/km^{2} (97/sq mi)
- Time zone: UTC0 (WET)
  - Summer (DST): UTC+1 (WEST)
- Postal Zone: 4660-080
- Area code: (+351) 254 XXX XXX
- Demonym: Felgueirense
- Patron Saint: São João Baptista
- Website: http://felgueiras.jfreguesia.com/
- Statistics from INE (2001); geographic detail from Instituto Geográfico Português (2010)

Felgueiras (Portuguese pronunciation: [ˌfɛlˈɣɐjɾɐʃ]) is a former civil parish in the municipality of Resende, Viseu District, Portugal. In 2013, the parish merged into the new parish Felgueiras e Feirão. In 2001, the population was 315 inhabitants occupying an area of 8.4 km² (approximately 37.5 inhabitants per km²).

== History ==
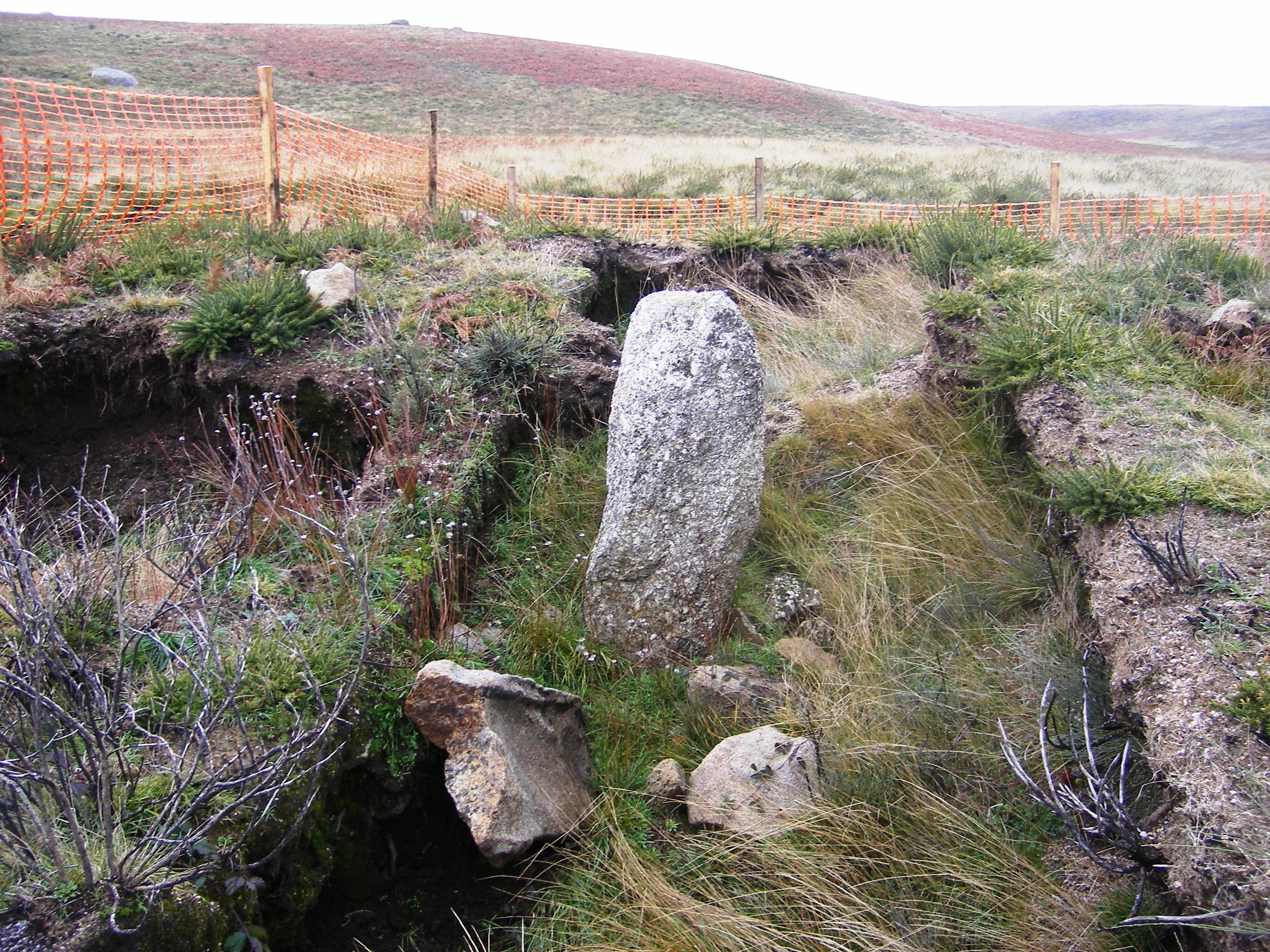
Remnants of a Megalithic circle used as a celestial observatory in the foothills of Mount São Cristóvão

The historical Chapel of Santo Espírito

The toponymy of the region comes from the Latin term filicarias, who means land of the fetos, Portuguese for ferns. Its origin, came from Roman explorers in the region:

"...well established in Cárquere, the Romans did not decease the exploration the area...in the direction of mount São Cristóvão, they encountered ferns in all directions...Felgueiras appeared in that way, by name, linked to the Roman colony of Cárquere and, certainly, in its primordial history."

Yet, its settlement did not begin with the Romans. In the mountains of São Cristóvão, around Felgueiras, several mounds have been discovered, remnants of castros dating back to the Neolithic. Digs in September 1994, near the Chapel of São Cristóvão (under the direction of Eduardo Jorge) discovered remnants of a megalithic cromlechs and other constructions, dating to the third or fourth millennium A.D., used as an astronomic observatory. The cromlech was used as a calendar to mark the seasons and/or as a sanctuary for tribal divinities. Historians continue to refer to these settlements as pre-Celtic, which could have been the Ligures or Turduli, common in the Iberian peninsula.

Moorish occupation in the region led to the names common in the toponymy, such as Alcoreiro, Albaredo and Alborda. The appearance of Sanfins and São Cristóvão, after the Reconquista in the 10th and 11th century. Felgueiras first appeared in the 13th century (1258), during the inventory and administrative inquiries of King Afonso III, as part of the Honra de Resende, which pertained to the descendants of Egas Moniz. In these documents the first settlements in the area of Felgueiras were identified: Firoos (Ferrós), Veyroos, Pumeiral (Pimeirol), Vineais (Vinhais) and Cyringos, which all belong to the parish of Felgueiras. In a 1227 document, Domingos Mendes donates the parish to the Monastery of Salzedas, on his death in order to find absolution and in order to be buried in the Monastery, in addition to receiving the benefits of the Order of Cister.

Another document, in 1234, from Dórdia Pires donated to small home in Felgueiras to the monastery. Likewise, in 1229, Alda Vasques donated two residences in Felgueiras, one in Ceringos and two in Pimentel. When King Manuel provided a foral (royal charter) in 1513 to the Honra de Resende, Felgueiras became a parish of the municipality, under the jurisdiction of the noble of Resende.

The first building dedicated to the local Junta de Freguesia (Portuguese: parish council), was constructed in 1981, in Outeiro do Espírito Santo, along the road from Felgueiras to Monte de São Cristóvão.

== Geography ==
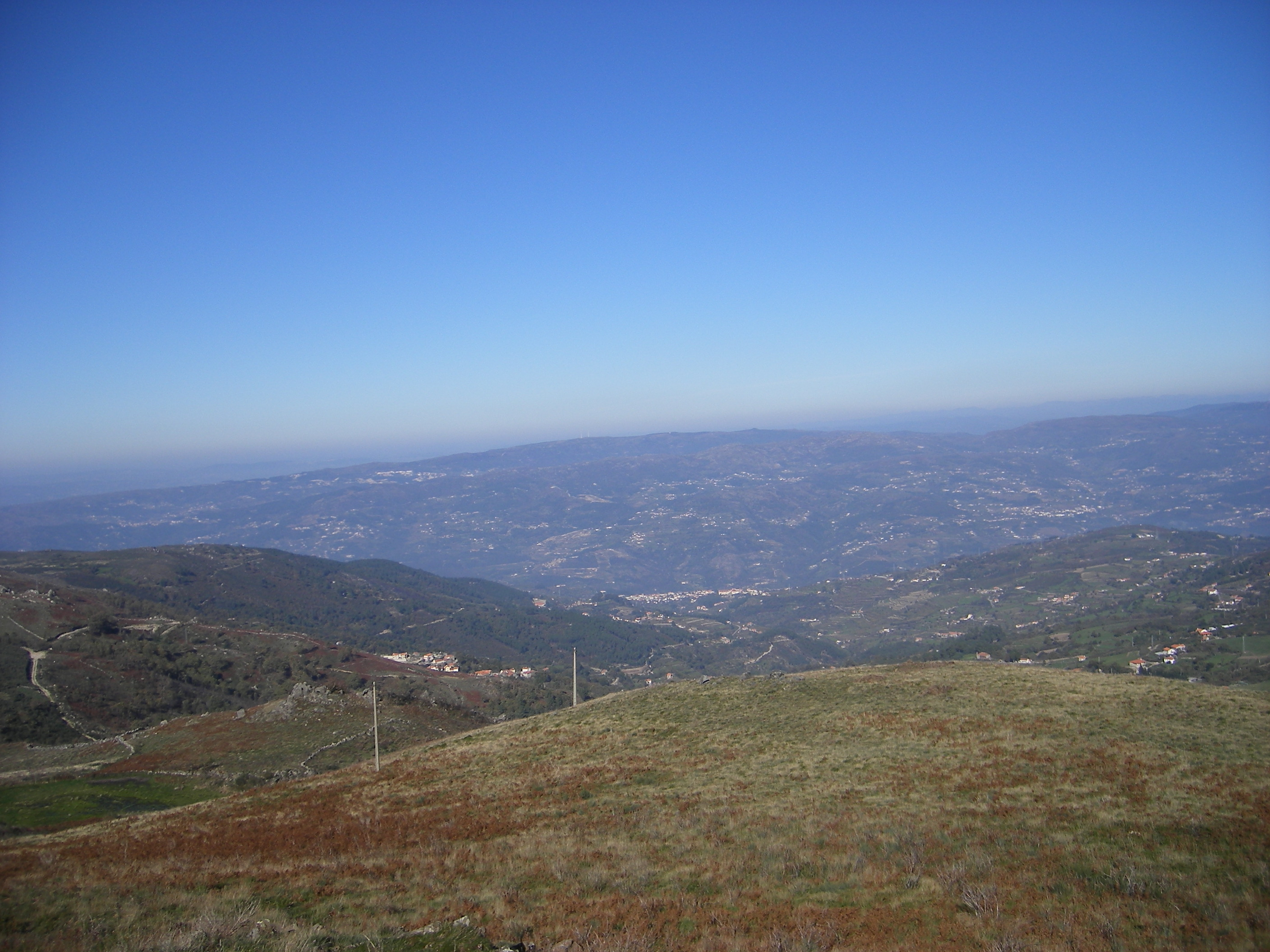
The view from Mount São Cristóvão in the foothills of the Montemuro

Nestled in the mountains, where the Montemuro inclines towards the Douro valley, Felgueiras is a parishes of hilltops, escarpments and semi-forested ranges located eight kilometres southeast of the village of Resende. The parish is limited in the north by the civil parish of Cárquere and Resende, to the east by Paus, south by Feirão and Panchorra, and west by Ovadas.

From São Cristóvão to Carvoeiro, and from Ladário to Côto, the land is built on a plateau of escarpments bisected by river valleys from 700 to 1142 metres altitude. The highest altitude is dominated by Monte de São Cristóvão, at an altitude of 1141 metres, cut by mountain valleys that trek towards the Douro River. Landscapes from this mountain include the valley of Bestança, the Serra do Marão, a freat part of the Douro Valley, in addition to the Serra do Gerês, on certain days.

With an accented relief, Montemuro is covered in heather and species of plants of the families Fabaceae, in addition to wild Maritime pine (Latin: Pinus pinaster). Common adders (Latin: Alnus glutinosa) and White willow (Latin: Salix alba) grow along the ravines, while in the forests of Portuguese oak (Latin: Quercus faginea) owls are common.

== Economy ==
Throughout its history its residents have been dedicated to agriculture and animal husbandry, activities that today continue to predominate the parish.

== Architecture ==
=== Religious ===
- Chapel of São Cristóvão (Portuguese: Saint Christopher) - known for a sculpted image in granite, the chapel in honour of Saint Christopher celebrates annual festivals on 25 July;
