= Ponte de São João =

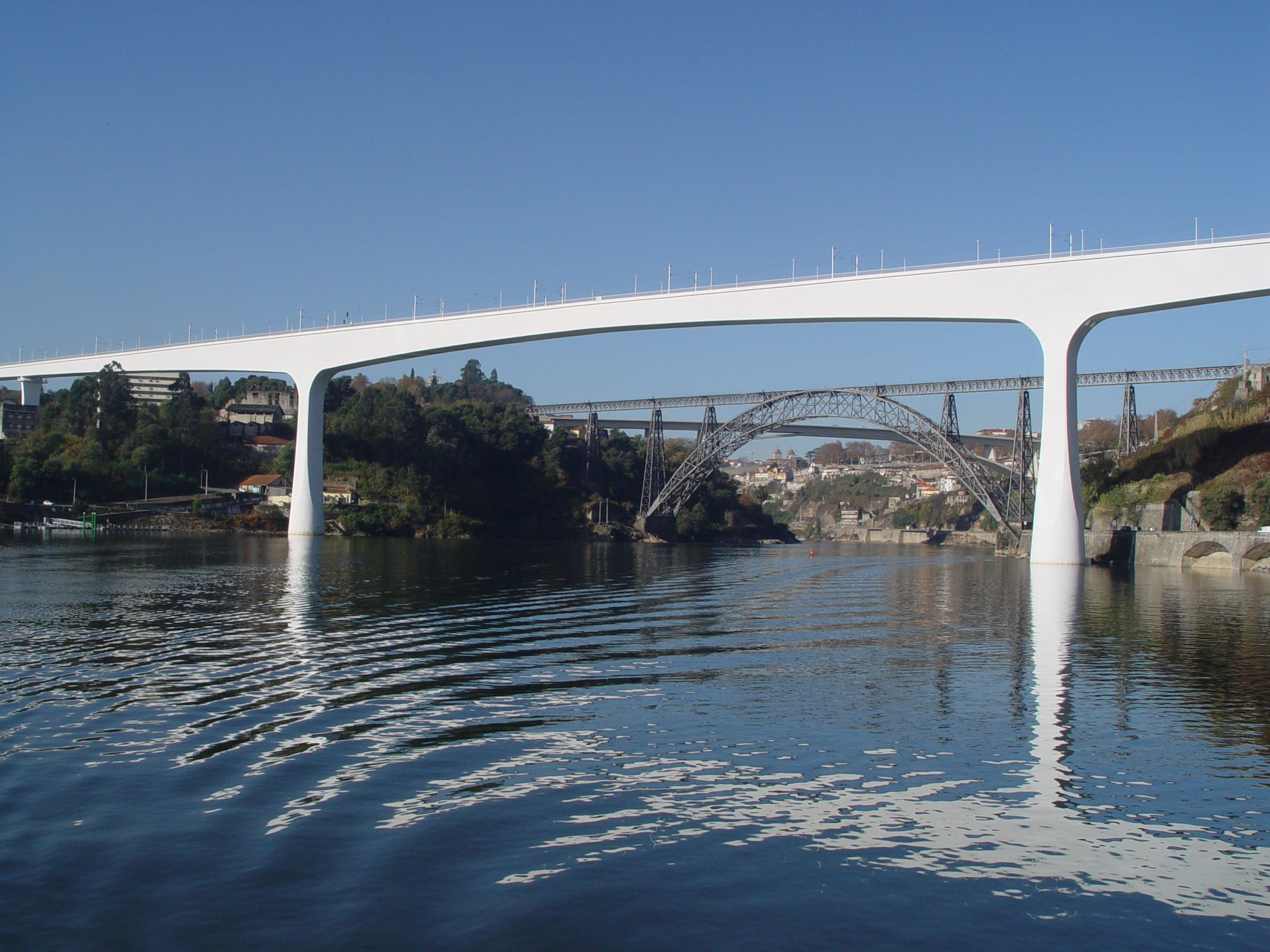
- Coordinates: 41°08′20″N 8°35′43″W
- Carries: railway
- Crosses: river Douro
- Locale: Porto, Portugal

Characteristics
- Total length: 1,140 m (3,740 ft)
- Longest span: 250 m (820 ft)

History
- Architect: Edgar Cardoso
- Construction end: 1991
- Inaugurated: June 24, 1991

Location
- Interactive map of Ponte de São João

The Ponte de São João or St John's Bridge is a railway bridge in Portugal. It was designed by engineer Edgar Cardoso and replaced the functionality of the still standing Gustav Eiffel wrought iron Maria Pia Bridge in 1991. It opened on June 24. The Linha do Norte connecting Porto and Lisbon runs along this bridge.
