= Reséndiz =

Reséndiz is a Spanish surname. Notable people with the surname include:

- Claudia Reséndiz (born 1994), Mexican volleyball player
- Javier Martínez Resendiz (born 1988), Mexican boxer
- Rafael González Reséndiz (born 1979), Mexican politician
- Victor Manuel Resendiz (born 1967), Mexican wrestler and actor

== See also ==
- Resende (surname), Portuguese variant
