= Ponte de Santa Clara =

Bridge in Portugal

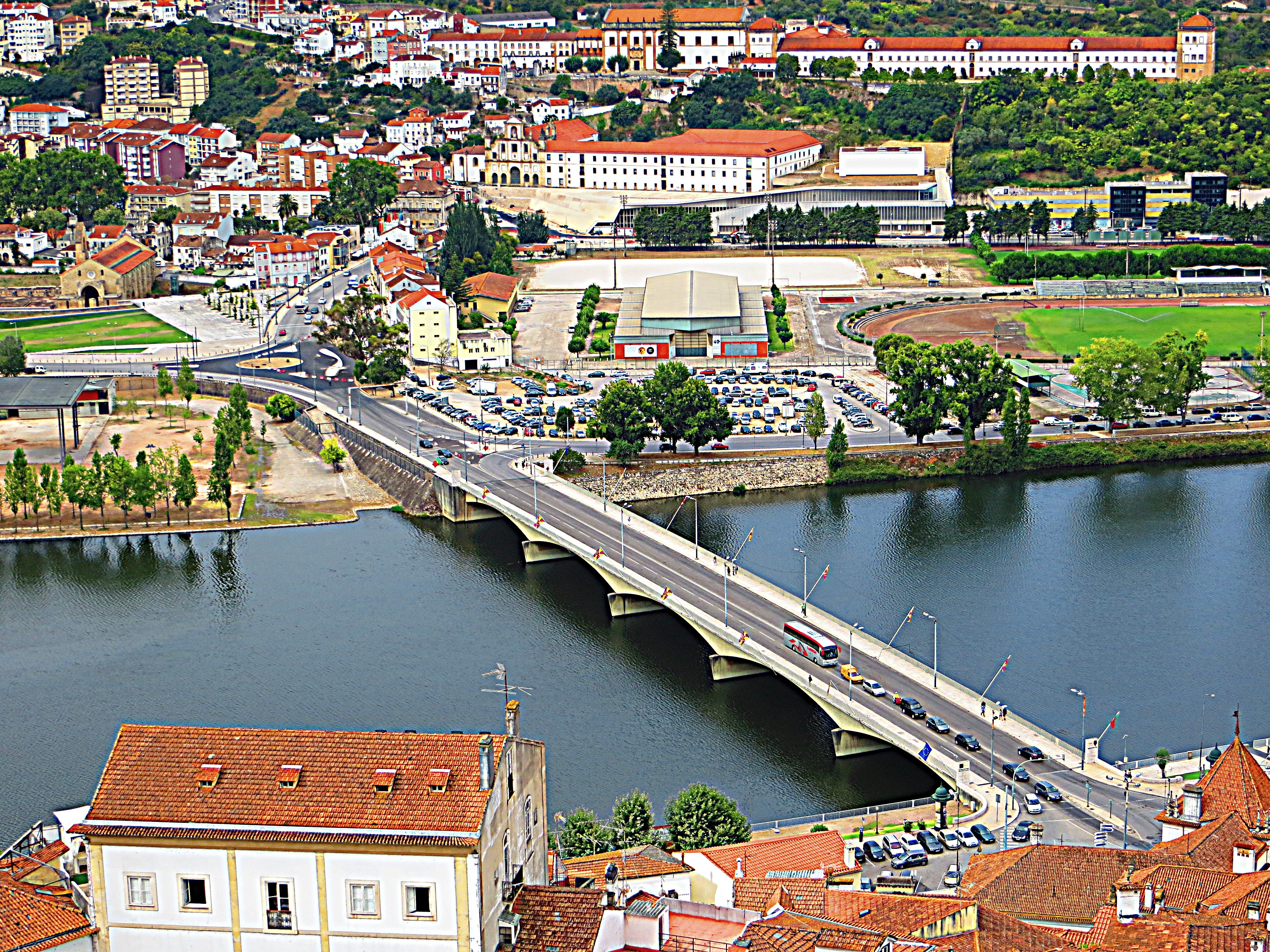
- Coordinates: 40°12′22″N 8°25′50″W
- Crosses: Mondego River
- Locale: Coimbra, Portugal
- Official name: Ponte de Santa Clara
- Maintained by: Estradas de Portugal

Characteristics
- Design: T-section and haunched girder bridge

History
- Designer: Edgar Cardoso
- Construction start: April 5, 1951
- Construction end: October 30, 1954
- Construction cost: € 75,000
- Opened: October 30, 1954; 70 years ago

The Ponte de Santa Clara (Portuguese for Santa Clara Bridge) is a t-section and haunched girder bridge completed and opened on 30 October 1954, crossing the Mondego River leading to the town square of Coimbra. It was inaugurated on the same date it opened by prime minister António de Oliveira Salazar for a total cost of 15,000 contos (€ 75,000).
