= Edgar Cardoso (engineer) =

Portuguese civil engineer and academic (1911–2000)

- Born: 11 May 1913; Resende, Portugal
- Died: 5 July 2000 (aged 87); Porto, Norte, Portugal

Edgar Cardoso (11 May 1913 – 5 July 2000) was a noted Portuguese civil engineer and university professor. In Portugal, Edgar Cardoso was a pioneer of experimental analysis of structures and of high precision instruments developed to measure parameters affecting structural behavior on small models of his own works.

== Early life ==
Cardoso was born in Resende and studied civil engineering at the University of Porto, in Porto, where he graduated in 1937. On 5 August 1935 Edgar Cardoso received a guideline to carry out a first period of training at the Port of Leixões to study the engineering works being carried out at the Port under the authority of the engineer Gervásio Leite. Cardoso's report was presented at the university on 23 October to high acclaim and given a grade of 16 points (out of 20) by the professors Teotónio Rodrigues and Antão de Almeida Garrett. Edgar Cardoso carried out at least one other period of training in Bragança in the JAE (national authority for Portuguese roads) already in 1937, the year he graduated in civil engineering from the Faculdade de Engenharia da Universidade do Porto. Another notable academic document from his student years was the report of a practical exercise that consisted of the full calculation of a swimming pool.

== Work ==
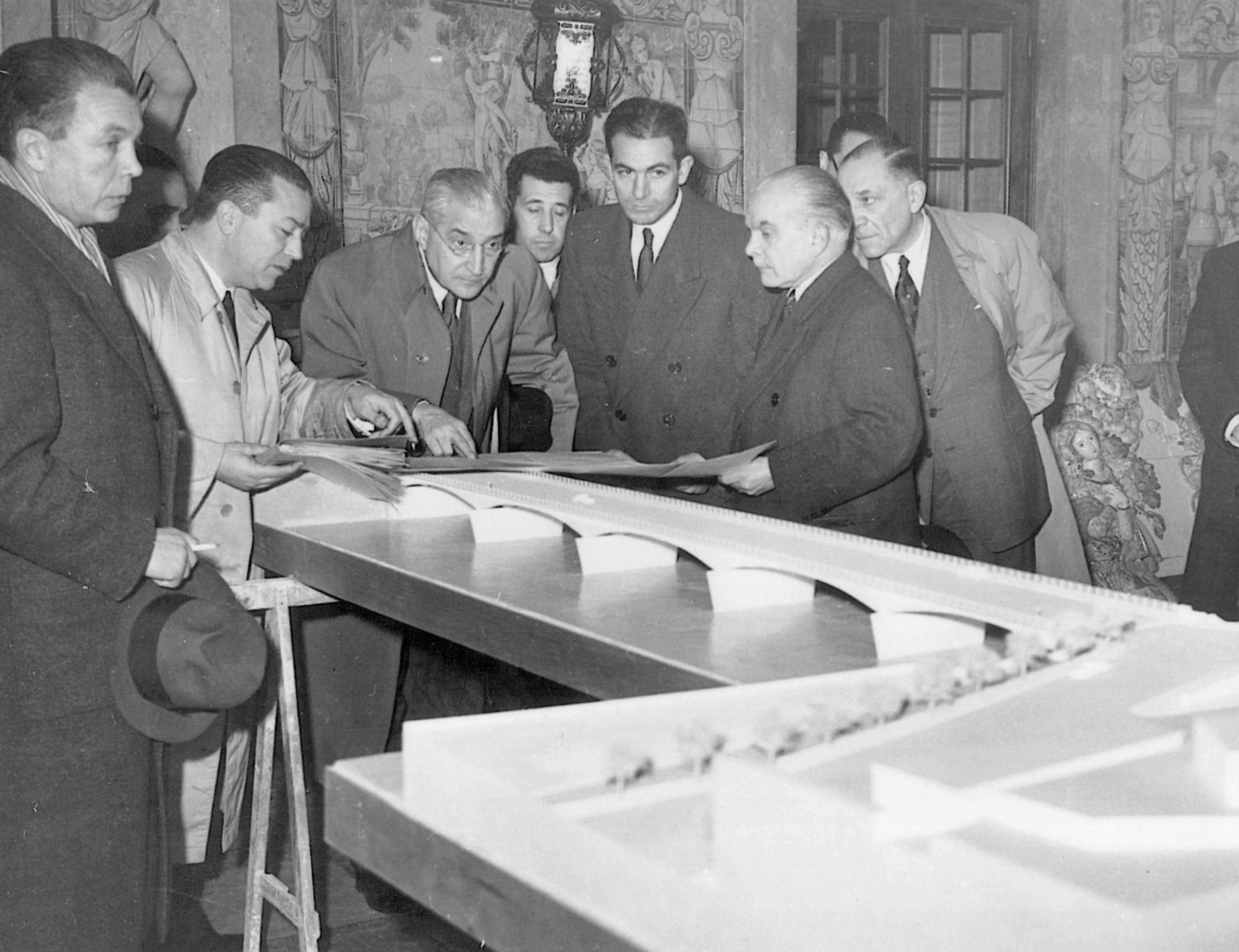
António Salazar, ruler of Portugal during the Estado Novo regime, observing Edgar Cardoso's Santa Clara Bridge maquette in Coimbra.

On 21 December 1954, Edgar Cardoso began his university teaching career in bridge building at the Instituto Superior Técnico (IST), a well known Portuguese school of engineering. He became a noted professor for many generations of civil engineers who graduated from IST.

Among the bridges that he designed is the Mosteirô bridge, a continuous truss frame beam, and the S.João railway bridge, a continuous structure one thousand metres in length. He made portico-shaped bridges and suspended bridges over the Zambezi River and Save River in Mozambique, and trussed beam bridges, over the Mondego river in Figueira da Foz, over the Kwanza river in Angola, over the Limpopo river in Xai-Xai, and in Macau. His big span concrete arcs, as on the Arrábida bridge (Porto), and in re-reinforced concrete porticos, as on the S. João railway bridge, achieved world records for that time. Since trussed beam bridges, as the Figueira da Foz bridge, the first Portuguese trussed beams bridge, until suspended bridges without rigidity beam, stabilized by the suspended cable and the inclination of kingpost whole rigidity, as in Zambeze bridge, Edgar Cardoso branded by the difference the structures engineering evolution. The Macau Taipa bridge was a challenge because of its provocative shape, a convex superstructure. Exceptionally large sizes were a characteristic of his last inventions, such as the S. João bridge and the Funchal airport runway extension.

Beyond his two great bridge projects, Edgar Cardoso invented certain aspects of bridges in Porto. These include a redesign of the upper deck of the Luís I Bridge and two projects that did not materialize, including the widening of the same bridge and a railroad bridge in the Arrábida Bridge, to replace the Maria Pia bridge.

His constructions include:

In Portugal

- Bridge of the Arrábida (Porto)
- Bridge of S. João
- Bridge of the Estuary of the Sousa
- Bridge of Santa Clara (Coimbra)
- Bridge of Mosteirô
- Bridge of the Mondego Estuary (Figueira da Foz)
- Bridges of the albufeira of the Caniçada
- Bridge of Barca d'Alva
- Bridge of São Fins
- Viaduct of Entrecampos
- Bridge of Abragão
- Bridge of the Marateca
- Bridges of the albufeira of the Maranhão
- Reconversion of the tray of Ponte Luís I (Porto)
- Reinforcement of Ponte D. Luís (Santarém)
- Expansion of the Funchal Airport bridge (Madeira)

In Portuguese Angola

- Bridge on the Kwanza
- Bridges of the railway line of Moçâmedes
- Bridges on the Cunene, Dande, Kwanza, Longa and Queve rivers

In Portuguese Mozambique

- Repairs to the bridge of Boane
- Bridge of Xai-Xai
- Bridge of the Pungué
- Bridge of the Save
- Bridge on the Zambezi River (Samora Machel Bridge)

In Macau

- Macau-Taipa Bridge (Governor Nobre de Carvalho Bridge)

In Portuguese India

- Bridge of Sauguém

In Portuguese Guinea

- Bridges of the Corubal and Cacheu

Blessed with extraordinary manual ability and a solid theorical background, Cardoso constructed models of his structures and on them measured, often with methods or devices he invented himself, the necessary parameters for evaluating the structural behavior.

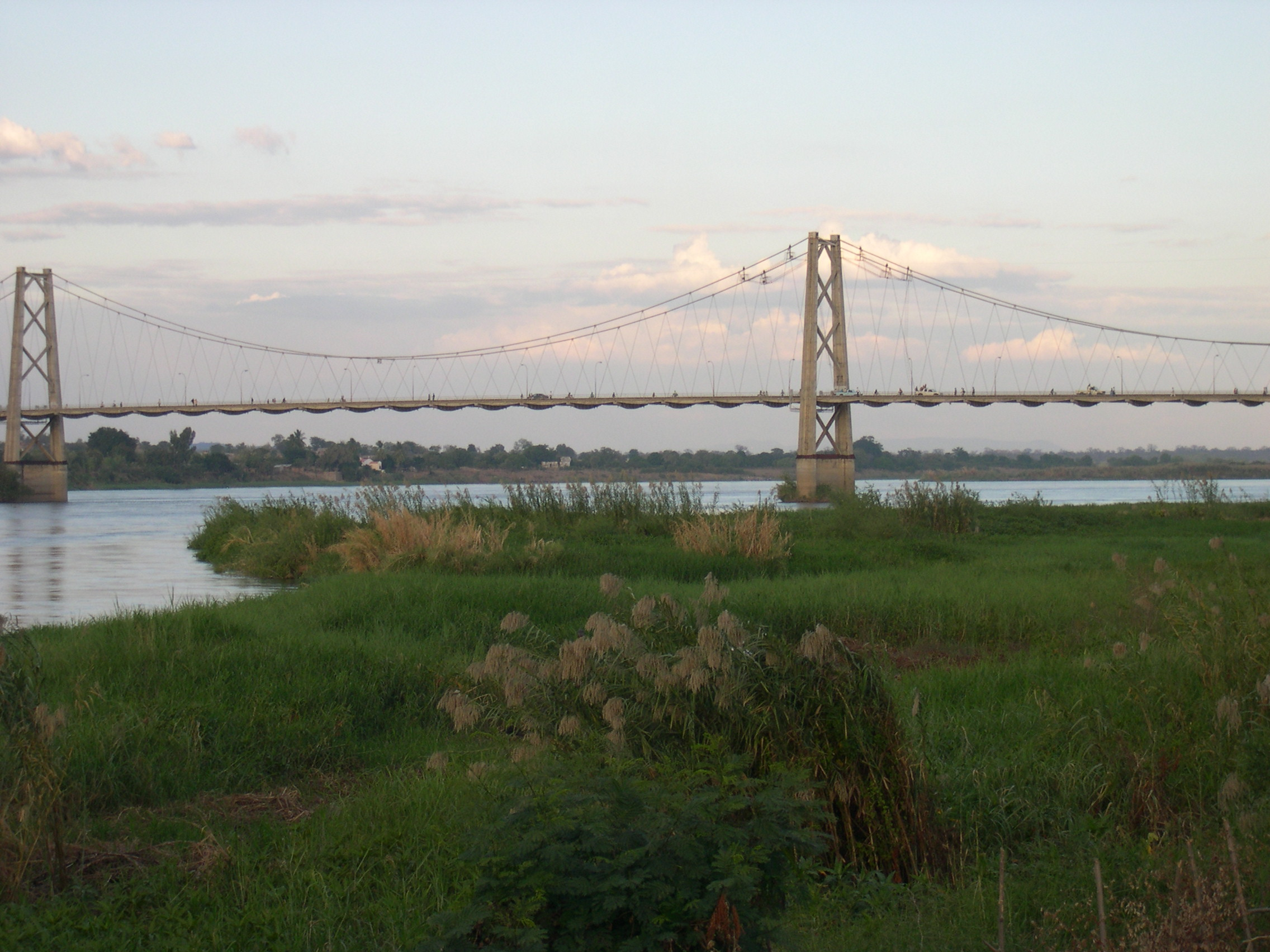
Edgar Cardoso's one-kilometre-long Tete suspension bridge, Mozambique
