= Macaé =

- Municipality
- Municipality of Macaé
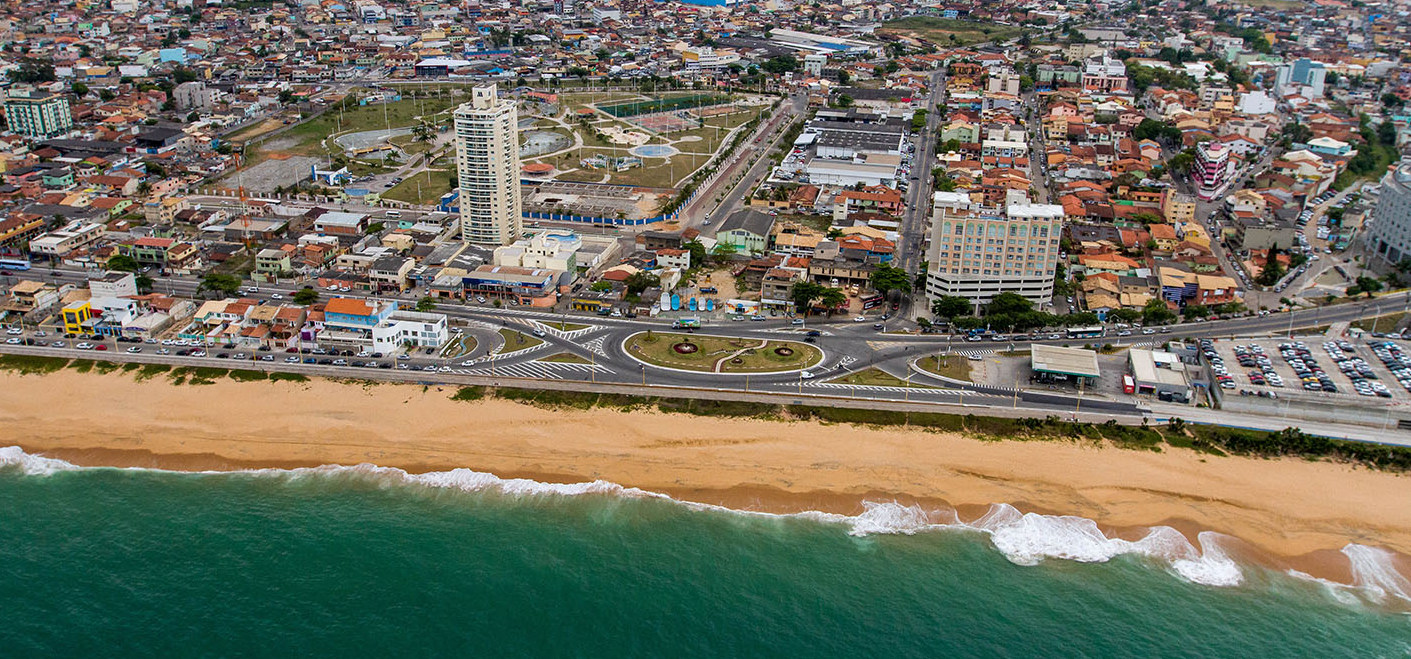
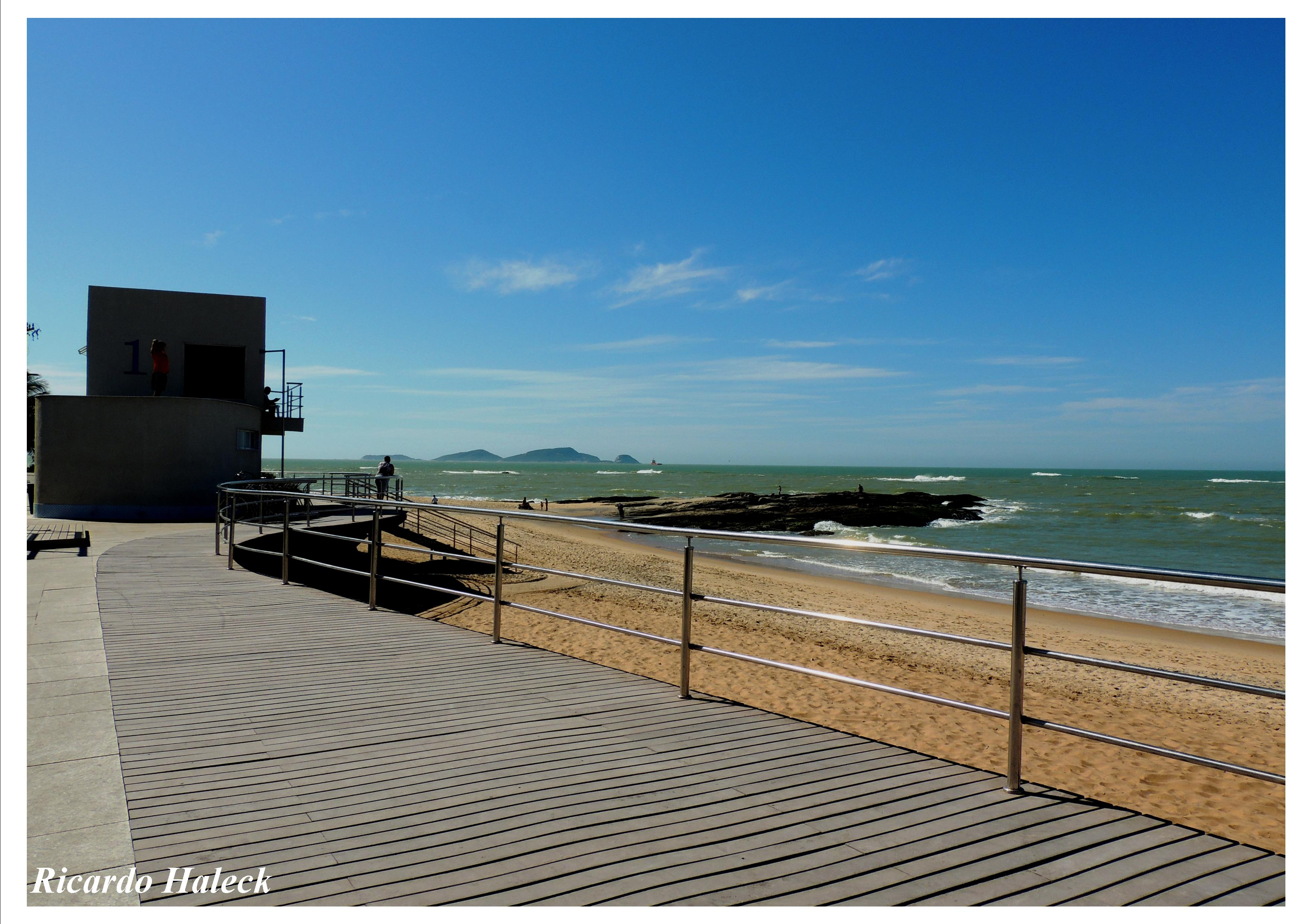
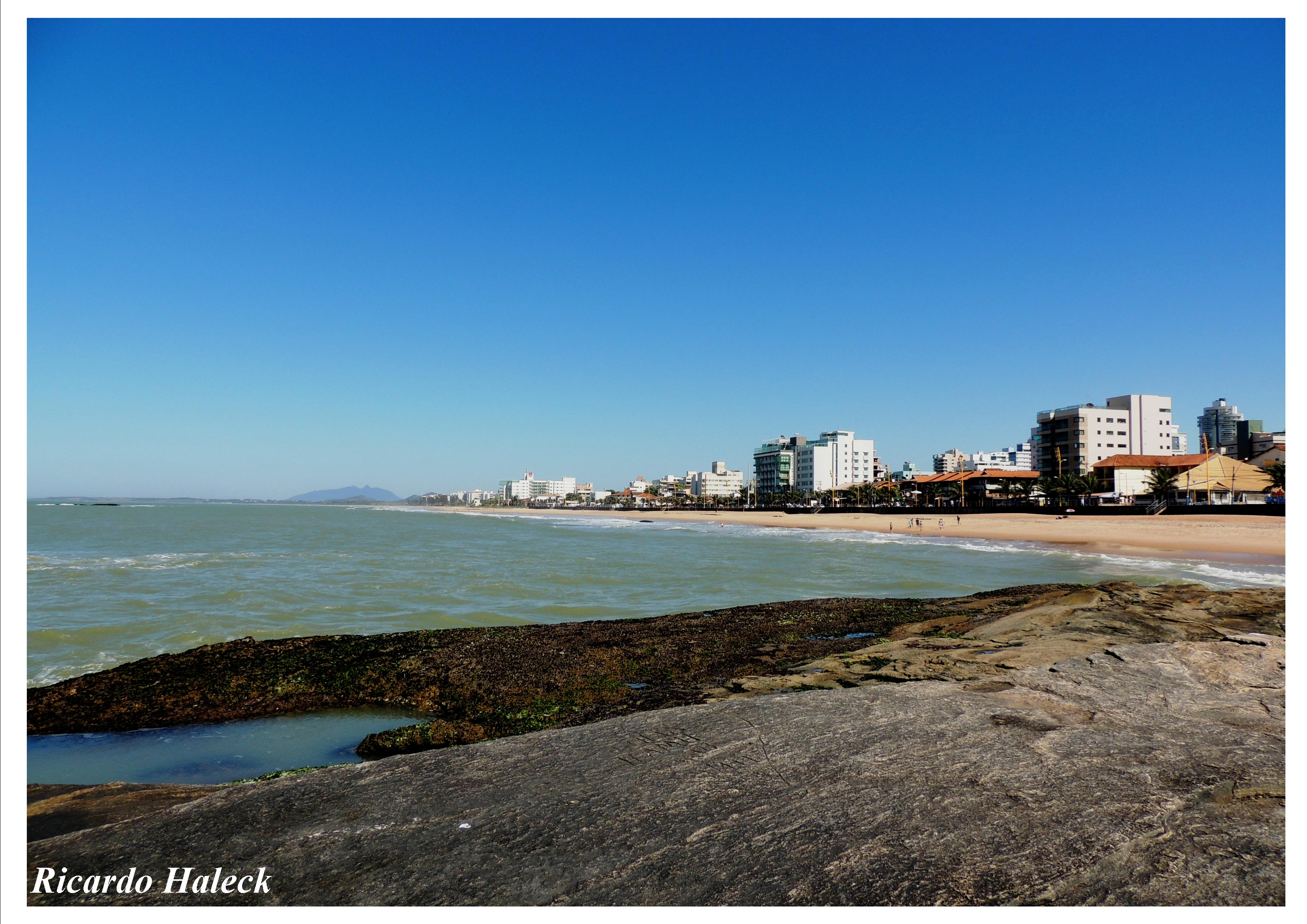
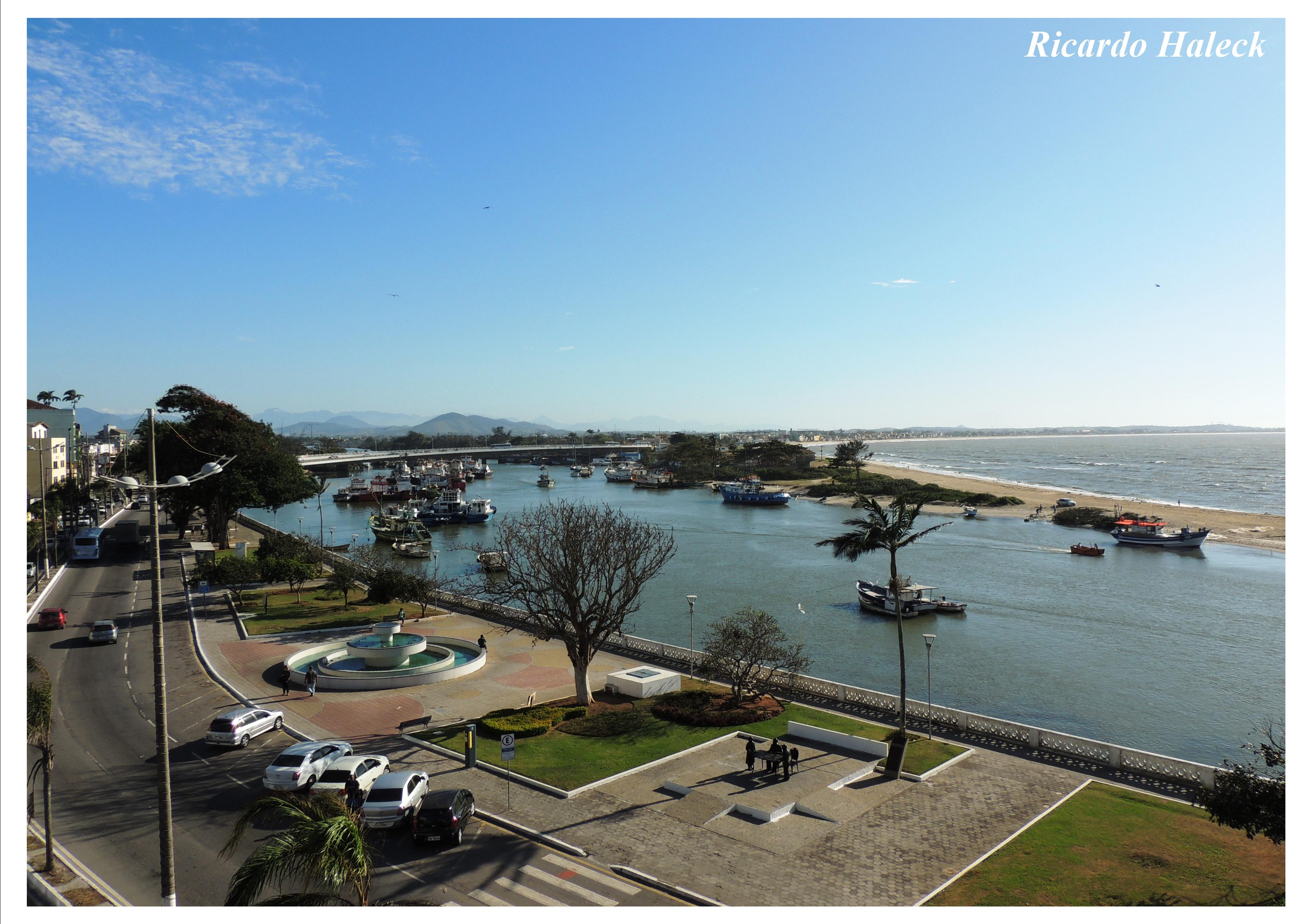
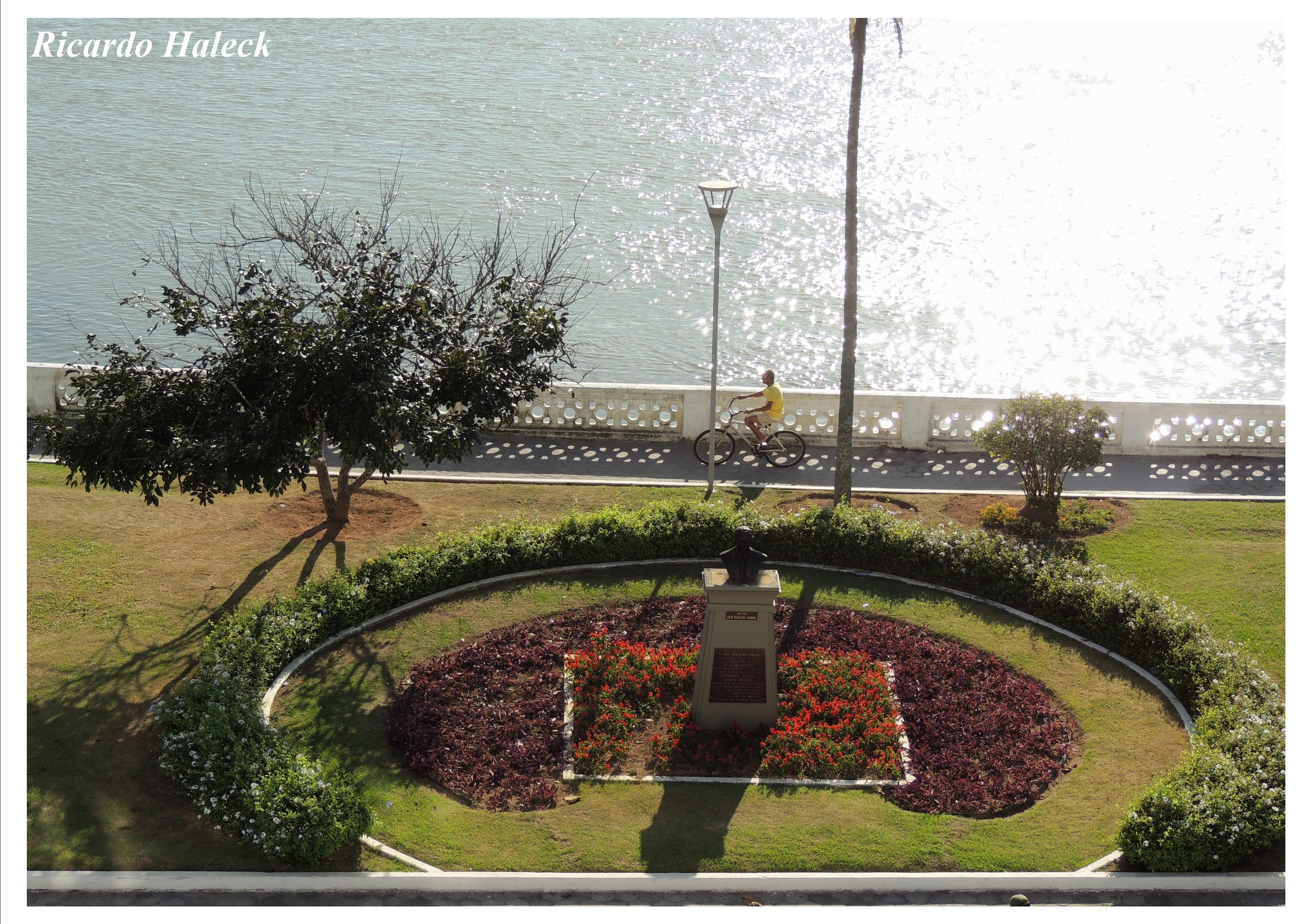
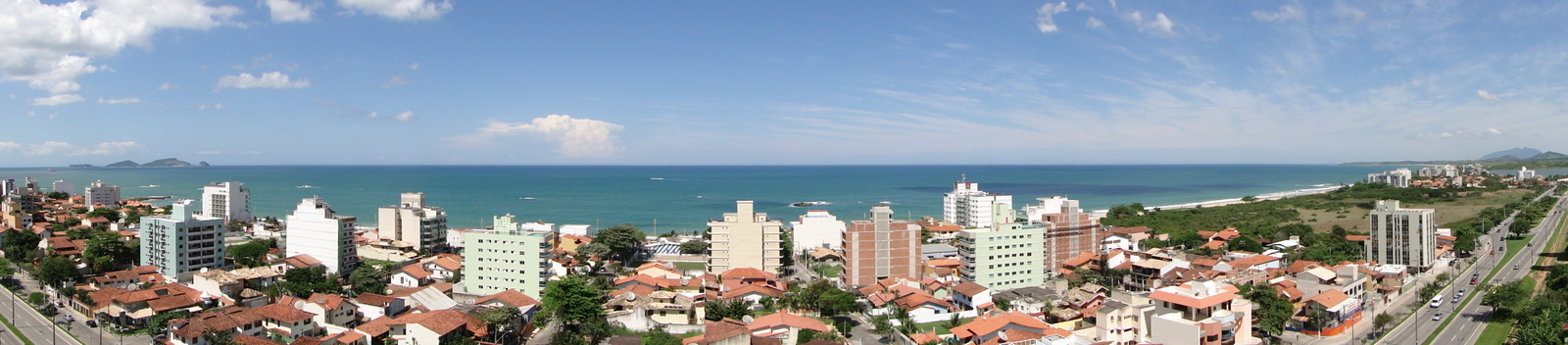

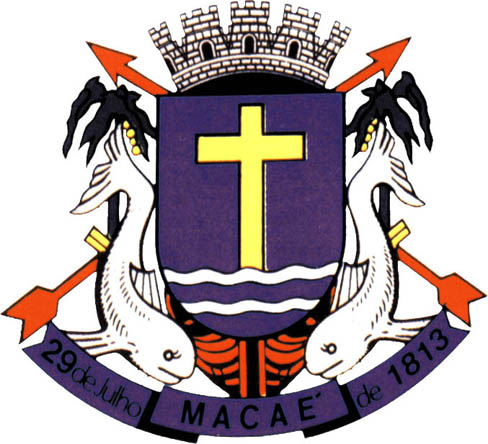
- Flag Coat of arms
- Nickname: "Princesinha do Atlântico, ou A Moreninha, ou Capital do Petróleo Brasileiro" (Little Princess of the Atlantic Ocean, The Little Brunette, The Brazilian Oil Capital City)
- Location in Rio de Janeiro
- Coordinates: 22°22′15″S 41°47′13″W
- Country: Brazil
- Region: Southeast
- State: Rio de Janeiro
- Founded: July 29, 1813

Government
  - Mayor: Welberth Rezende (Cidadania)

Area
  - Total: 1,216 km^{2} (470 sq mi)

Population (2022)
  - Total: 246,391
  - Estimate (2025): 264,439
  - Density: 215.28/km^{2} (557.57/sq mi)
- Time zone: UTC−3 (BRT)
- HDI (2010): 0.764 – high
- Website: macae.rj.gov.br

Macaé (Portuguese pronunciation: [mɐkɐˈɛ]) is a municipality located in the Brazilian state of Rio de Janeiro, 180 km northeast of the state capital. It is the birthplace of the 13th president of Brazil, Washington Luís.

== Geography ==
=== Location ===
Macaé is generally considered to be the centre of the offshore petroleum industry in Brazil and it is often referred to as "Cidade do Petróleo" ("City of Petroleum"). The Brazilian state-controlled oil company Petrobras has many facilities within the town. Macaé is one of the fastest-growing cities in Brazil, with a growth of 600% within the last 10 years. Benedito Lacerda Airport is served by scheduled flights and concentrates operations to off-shore platforms.

According to the 2022 census conducted by the IBGE,the municipality has a population of 246,391 and covers an area of 1,216.989 square kilometers.

Other economic activities in the city include tourism and fishing. These two sectors were very important for the city's revenues before the 1980s. The city has a growing reputation for high-quality technical education and training.

Macaé, 1953. National Archives of Brazil.

The municipality contains part of the Central Rio de Janeiro Atlantic Forest Mosaic of conservation units, created in 2006. It also holds part of the União Biological Reserve, home to a population of endangered golden lion tamarin.

Although the city has some tourist potential, the lack of investments in this area makes its growth to be very small. Its most famous beaches are Cavaleiros and Pecado. The interior of the municipality has small rural towns such as Sana and Frade.

== Demography ==
In 2009 the Brazilian Institute of Geography and Statistics (IBGE) estimated the population of Macaé as 194,413 inhabitants. The National Department of Transit (Denatran) census in 2003 recorded a fleet of 36,821 vehicles. According to the Electoral Regional Court (TRE-RJ), the number of voters registered in Macaé was 97,184 in 2004, divided in two electoral zones and 268 sections. In the last elections, 84,054 (200.49%) people voted.

The city has an expatriate community (mainly English speakers) of around 1000 people - many of whom are connected directly or indirectly to the oil and gas industry.

== Economy ==
Since the 1970s, when Petrobras chose Macaé to site its headquarters in the Campos Basin, the city has had a population boom. More than four thousand companies have set up offices in the city and its population has tripled since. High-quality hotels have been constructed and a wide variety of service industries have recently sprouted up.

The city has the biggest tax generation of new ranks of work of the interior of the state, according to research conducted for the Federation of Industries of Rio de Janeiro (Firjan): 13.2% to the year. The economy of the city has grown 600% since 1997. Surveys conducted in past years for IBGE demonstrated that the Internal Gross Product (in Portuguese, Produto Interno Bruto - PIB) per capita of the city in 2007 is R$37,667.00 per year, 200% greater than the national average- and the average salary is 8.2 times the minimum salary, making Macaé the city with the highest wages in the Rio de Janeiro State.

== Education ==
The city holds various public and private schools for primary and secondary education. Also, there are different institutions of higher education, which include: Universidade Federal do Rio de Janeiro (UFRJ), Universidade Federal Fluminense (UFF), Faculdade Miguel Ângelo da Silva Santos (FEMASS), Faculdade Estácio de Sá - Macaé. There are different areas of study, ranging from Business Management to Medicine to Law.

== Sports ==
=== American Football ===
The Macaé Oilers Association of American Football was started in 2013; citizens played on the Macaé beaches.

In 2014 the team competed its first state championship as the Macaé Oilers. The first title came in 2015 when the Oilers defeated the Volta Redonda Falcons at the Raulino de Oliveira Stadium.

In 2016, the team became State Champions for the 2nd time, defeating Teresópolis Rockers (team B of Flamengo FA.) This took place on the same stage: Raulino de Oliveira Stadium.

== Twin Towns - sister cities ==
- Stavanger, Norway
- Fara Filiorum Petri, Italy

== Climate ==
Climate data for Macaé (1981–2010)
Month	Jan	Feb	Mar	Apr	May	Jun	Jul	Aug	Sep	Oct	Nov	Dec	Year
Mean daily maximum °C (°F)	31.1 (88.0)	31.8 (89.2)	30.6 (87.1)	29.4 (84.9)	27.6 (81.7)	26.8 (80.2)	26.3 (79.3)	26.4 (79.5)	26.3 (79.3)	27.3 (81.1)	28.9 (84.0)	29.9 (85.8)	28.5 (83.3)
Mean daily minimum °C (°F)	22.1 (71.8)	22.4 (72.3)	21.6 (70.9)	20.5 (68.9)	18.5 (65.3)	16.9 (62.4)	16.5 (61.7)	16.7 (62.1)	17.7 (63.9)	19.1 (66.4)	20.4 (68.7)	21.4 (70.5)	19.5 (67.1)
Average precipitation mm (inches)	176.0 (6.93)	102.0 (4.02)	153.0 (6.02)	85.0 (3.35)	59.0 (2.32)	31.0 (1.22)	31.0 (1.22)	32.0 (1.26)	64.0 (2.52)	99.0 (3.90)	187.0 (7.36)	196.0 (7.72)	1,215 (47.84)
Mean monthly sunshine hours	197.5	195.5	182.5	182.1	183.4	184.6	198.6	188.9	124.6	147.8	167.5	162.8	2,115.8
Source 1: Instituto Nacional de Meteorologia
Source 2: Climatempo (precipitation)
