= Felgueiras e Feirão =

- Civil parish
- Location in Portugal
- Coordinates: 41.04°N 7.93°W
- Country: Portugal
- Region: Norte
- Intermunic. comm.: Tâmega e Sousa
- District: Viseu
- Municipality: Resende

Area
  - Total: 13.28 km^{2} (5.13 sq mi)

Population (2011)
  - Total: 436
  - Density: 32.8/km^{2} (85.0/sq mi)
- Time zone: UTC+00:00 (WET)
  - Summer (DST): UTC+01:00 (WEST)

Felgueiras e Feirão is a civil parish in the municipality of Resende, Portugal. It was formed in 2013 by the merger of the former parishes Felgueiras and Feirão. The population in 2011 was 436, in an area of 13.28 km^{2}.
