= Tullio =

Tullio is a common Italian male given name of Latin origin, derived from Tullius (meaning "the one who leads"). Other forms of the name are Tulio (Spanish) and Túlio (Portuguese). It has a second meaning that is hill or valley of the hills. It may refer to:

== Given name ==
- Tullio Altamura (1924–2005), Italian film actor
- Carlo Tullio Altan (1916–2005), Italian anthropologist, sociologist and philosopher
- Tullio Avoledo (born 1957), Italian novelist
- Tullio Baraglia (1934–2017), Italian rower
- Tullio Bozza (1891–1922), Italian fencer
- Tullio Campagnolo (1901–1983), Italian racing cyclist and inventor
- Tullio Carminati (1894–1971), Italian actor
- Tullio Cianetti (1899–1976), Italian fascist politician
- Tullio Crali (1910–2000), Italian artist
- Tullio De Mauro (1932–2017), Italian linguist and politician
- Tullio De Piscopo (born 1946), Italian drummer and singer
- Tullio DeSantis (born 1948), American contemporary artist
- Marco Tullio Giordana (born 1950), Italian screenwriter and film director
- Tullio Gonnelli (1912–2005), Italian athlete
- Tullio Ilomets (1921–2018), Estonian chemist and science historian
- Tullio Kezich (1928–2009), Italian film critic, playwright and actor
- Tullio Lanese (1947–2025), Italian football referee
- Tullio Levi-Civita (1873–1941), Italian mathematician
- Tullio Liberati (born c. 1968), American politician
- Tullio Liblik (born 1964), Estonian businessman
- Tullio Lombardo (1460–1532), Italian renaissance sculptor
- Tullio Moneta (1937–2022), Italian-South African actor
- Tullio Pandolfini (1914–1999), Italian water polo player
- Tullio Pinelli (1908–2009), Italian screenwriter
- Tullio Regge (1931–2014), Italian physicist
- Tullio Rossi (1948–2025), Italian cyclist
- Tullio Serafin (1878–1968), Italian conductor
- Mark Tullio Strukelj (born 1962), Italian footballer
- Tullio Tamburini (1892–1957), Italian soldier and fascist official

== Other uses ==
- Tullio phenomenon, auditory phenomenon named after the Italian biologist Pietro Tullio
- Louis J. Tullio Arena, sports arena in Erie, Pennsylvania, named after mayor Louis J. Tullio
- Pro Tullio, a 71 BC judicial speech by the Roman writer Cicero

== See also ==
- Tullius
- Tulio
