= Resendes =

Resendes is a Portuguese surname (a variant of Resende), derived from a habitational name from any of several places so called in Portugal; for example, in Resende Municipality. The place name comes from the genitive case of a Visigothic personal name composed of the elements reþs (reths) ‘counsel’, ‘advice’ + sinþs (sinths) ‘way’, ‘path’.

It has been documented in the following forms: Reesendi, Reisindi (13th century), Reezende (15th century), Rresende and Reseende, reaching the Portuguese vernacular as designated geography, with the derivative Latin Risindi.

The family started with D. Egas Muniz, branch of the first King of Portugal, founder of the monastery of Cárquere, next to which is the family estate of D. Arnaldo Rezende. D. Martin Afonso de Baião was the first who used the surname of Rezende.

== Famous persons with Resendes surname ==
- Pedro Miguel Carreiro Resendes (born 1973), aka Pauleta, Portuguese former professional footballer
- Vasco Braga Resendes, Entrepreneur, Infantry Soldier U.S.A. Army and Poet: book; Vasco's poems - ISBN 978-1-4537-1399-0, eBook; Vasco's Top Ten Poems - ISBN 9781301118410.
