= Mauricio Resende =

Brazilian-American operations research scientist

Mauricio G. C. Resende (born July 27, 1955 in Maceió, Brazil) is a Brazilian-American research scientist with contributions to the field of mathematical optimization. He is best known for the development of the metaheuristics GRASP (greedy randomized adaptive search procedures), and BRKGA (biased random-key genetic algorithms) as well as the first successful implementation of Karmarkar’s interior point algorithm.

He published over 180 peer-reviewed papers, the book Optimization by GRASP and co-edited five books, including the Handbook of Applied Optimization, the Handbook of Optimization in Telecommunications, the Handbook of Heuristics, and the Handbook of Massive Datasets. Additionally, he gave multiple plenary talks in international conferences and is on the editorial boards of several scientific journals.

== Education ==
In June 1978, Mauricio G. C. Resende graduated from PUC-Rio with an Electrical Engineering degree with concentration in Systems Engineering. In August 1979, he earned a M.Sc. in operations research at the Georgia Institute of Technology. Later, in August 1987, he earned a Ph.D. in operations research in at the University of California, Berkeley.

== Career ==
Mauricio G. C. Resende is currently an INFORMS Fellow, holds a permanent member position of DIMACS at Rutgers University and is an affiliate professor at the University of Washington. Until December 2022, he worked at Amazon.com as a Principal Research Scientist in the Mathematical Optimization and Planning group. Previously, he was Lead Inventive Scientist at AT&T Bell Labs where he worked for over a quarter century.
