= Welberth Rezende =

Brazilian politician (born 1975)

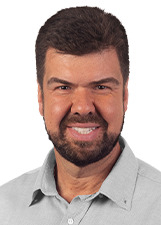
- Rezende in 2024

Mayor of Macaé
- Incumbent
- Assumed office 1 January 2021
- Preceded by: Dr. Aluizio

Personal details
- Born: 20 August 1975 (age 51)
- Party: Cidadania (since 2007)

Welberth Porto de Rezende (born 20 August 1975) is a Brazilian politician serving as mayor of Macaé since 2021. From 2019 to 2020, he was a member of the Legislative Assembly of Rio de Janeiro.
