= Théophile Seyrig =

German engineer

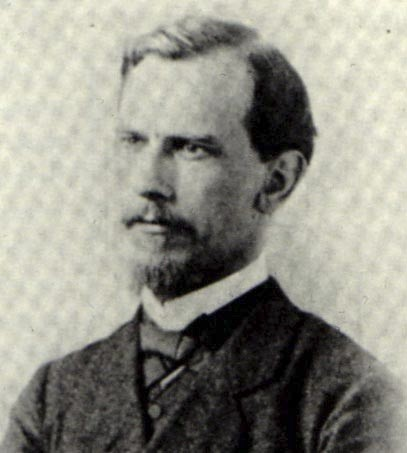
- Seyrig, circa 1890.
- Born: François Gustave Théophile Seyrig; 19 February 1843; Berlin, Germany
- Died: 5 July 1923 (aged 80)
- Education: École Centrale Paris

François Gustave Théophile Seyrig (19 February 1843 – 5 July 1923) was a German-born French engineer, best known for designing bridges.

On 6 October 1868, he founded Eiffel and Company with Gustave Eiffel. Seyrig contributed to the Eiffel and Company project to build the Maria Pia Bridge in Porto, Portugal, which was finished in 1877. Seyrig presented a paper on the bridge to the Société des Ingénieurs Civils in 1878.

Later he worked for the Belgian firm Société Willebroeck in Brussels, and won the competition to build the Dom Luís I Bridge (also in Porto), beating the Eiffel proposal. He began construction in 1881 and the bridge was finished in 1886.

== Works ==
- Maria Pia Bridge
- Dom Luís I Bridge
- Neuvial Viaduct
- Rouzat Viaduct
Bridges of Porto

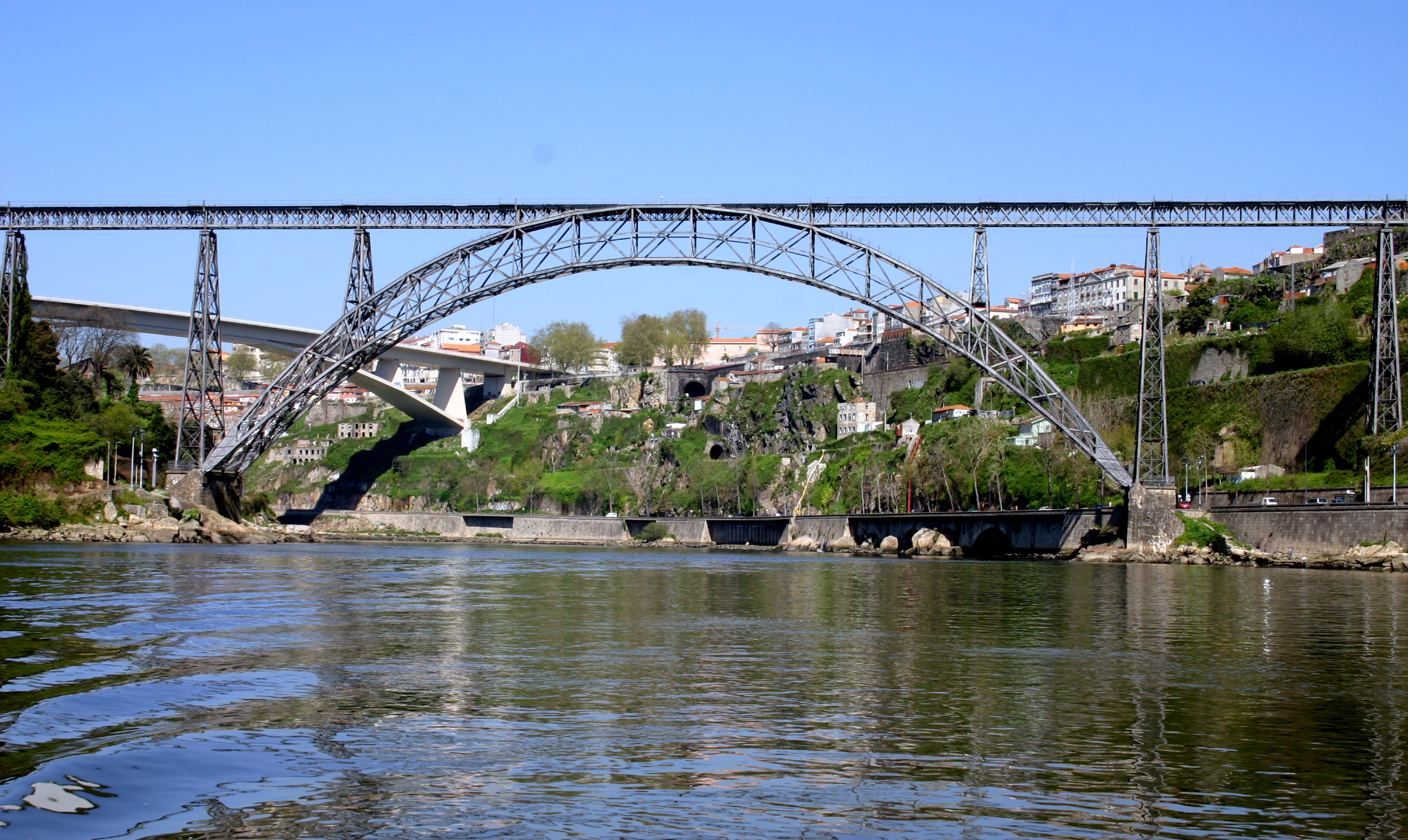
Maria Pia Bridge (1877).

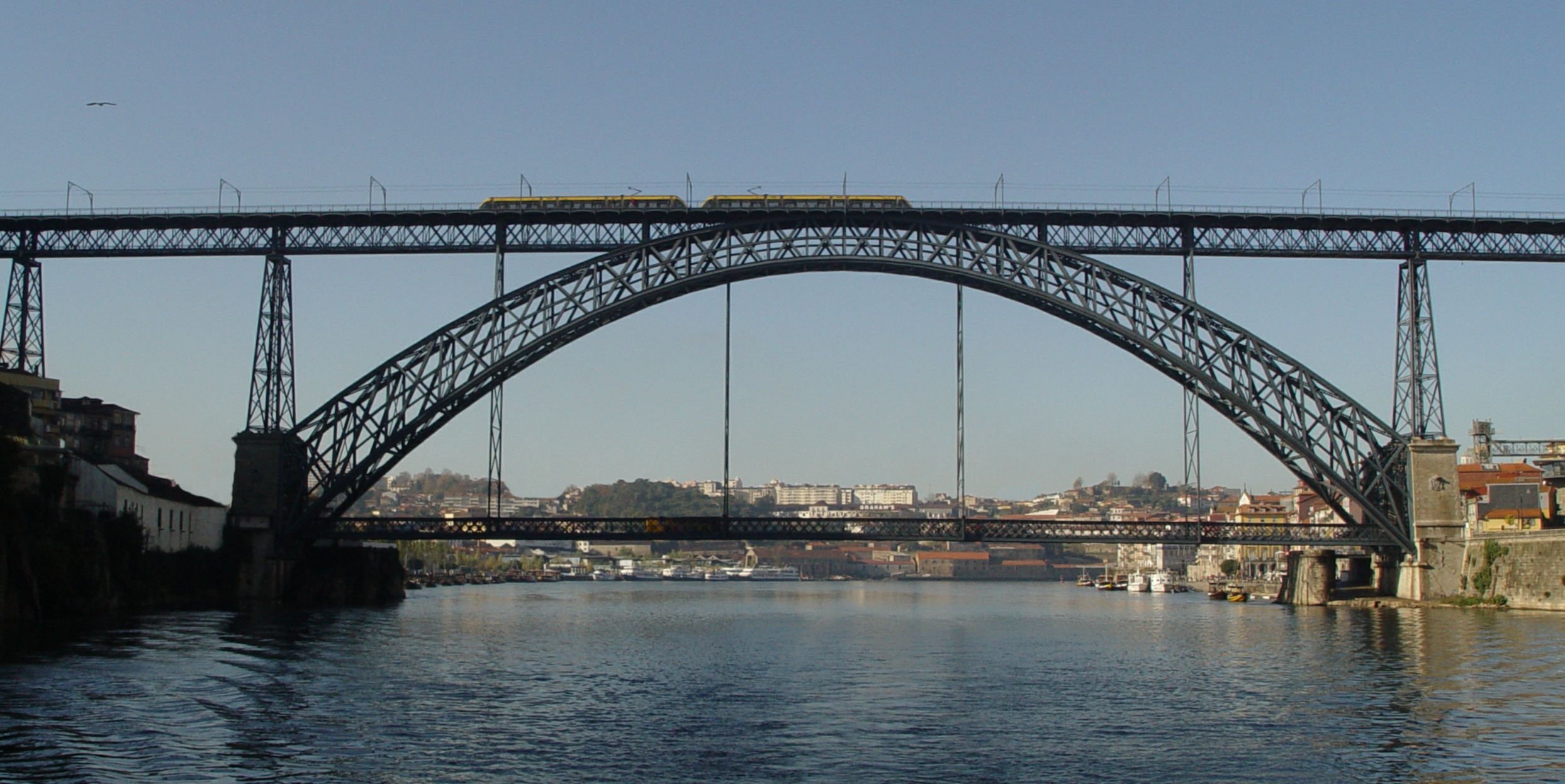
Dom Luís I Bridge (1886).

== Writings ==
- (in French) Seyrig, Théophile. Pont d. Luiz I. à Porto, Librairie centrales des chemins de fer, Paris, 1884
- (in French) Seyrig, Théophile. Éléments de statique graphique appliquée aux constructions, Baudry, Paris, 1886; pp. 392

== Bibliography ==
- (in Portuguese) Ponte Maria Pia, Ordem dos Engenheiros, Região Norte, ISBN 972956468X, 2005
