= Tulio Rezende =

Brazilian politician (born 2004)

Member of the Legislative Assembly of Maranhão
- Incumbent
- Assumed office 1 February 2027

Personal details
- Born: 26 February 2004 (age 22)
- Party: Brazilian Democratic Movement
- Parents: Stênio Rezende (father); Andreia Rezende (mother)

Tulio Martins Rezende (born 26 February 2004) is a Brazilian politician who was elected member of the Legislative Assembly of Maranhão in 2026. He is the son of Andreia Rezende and Stênio Rezende.
