= Resende (parish) =

- Civil parish
- Location in Portugal
- Coordinates: 41.106°N 7.964°W
- Country: Portugal
- Region: Norte
- Intermunic. comm.: Tâmega e Sousa
- District: Viseu
- Municipality: Resende

Area
  - Total: 11.88 km^{2} (4.59 sq mi)

Population (2011)
  - Total: 3,166
  - Density: 266.5/km^{2} (690.2/sq mi)
- Time zone: UTC+00:00 (WET)
  - Summer (DST): UTC+01:00 (WEST)

Resende is a town (vila) in Resende Municipality in Viseu District in Portugal. The population in 2011 was 3,166, in an area of 11.88 km^{2}.
