= Resende, Portugal =

Resende
- Municipality
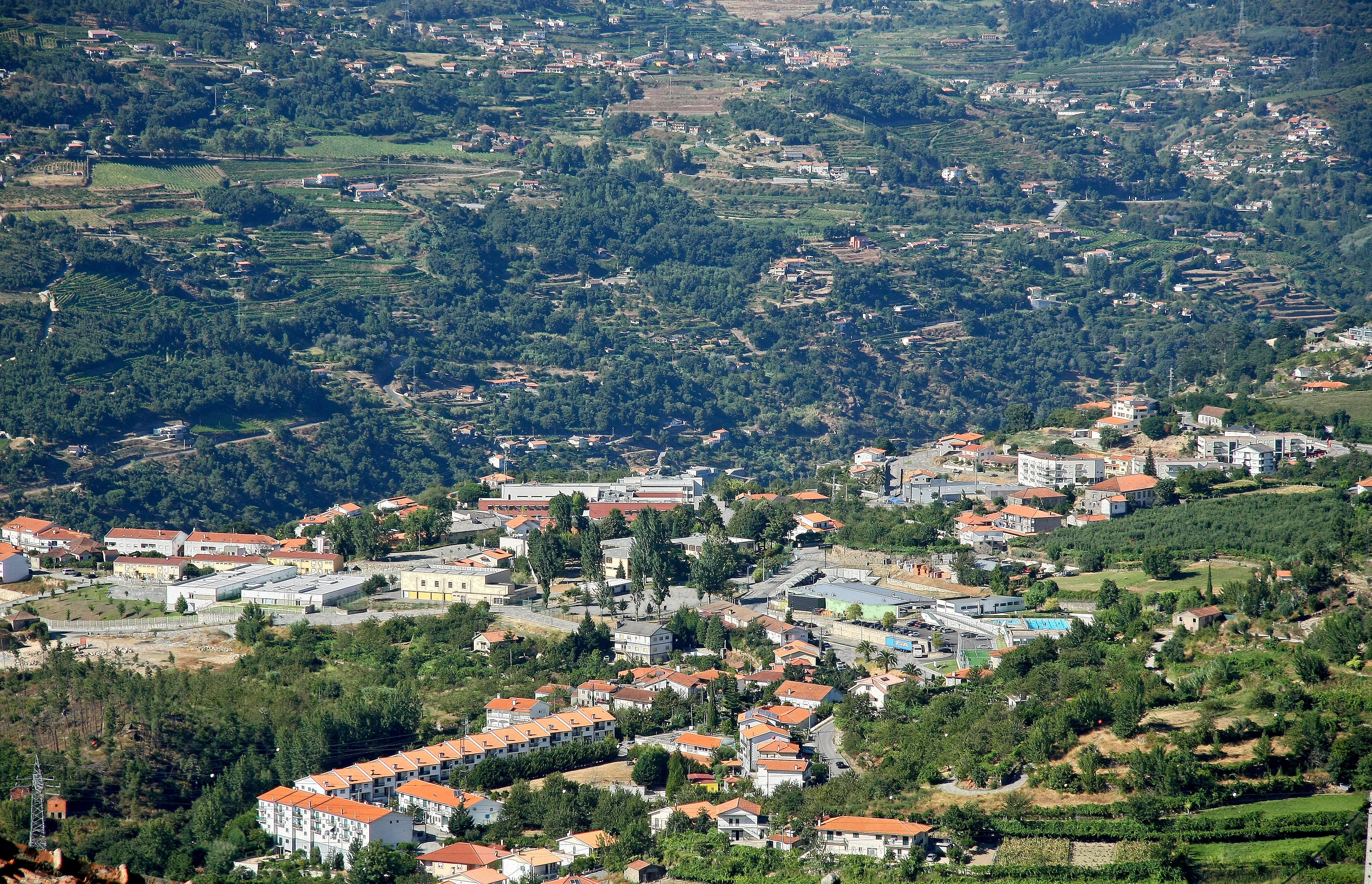
- View of Resende

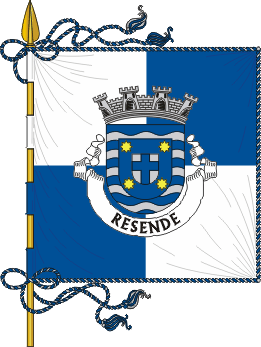
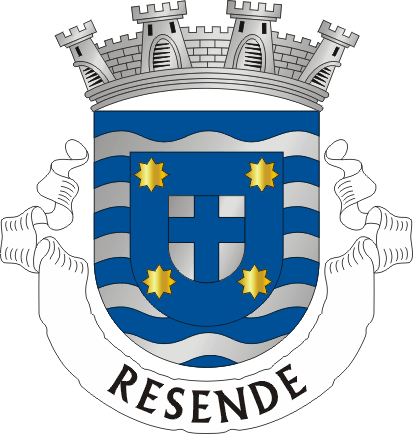
- Flag Coat of arms
- Interactive map of Resende
- Coordinates: 41°06′N 7°57′W
- Country: Portugal
- Region: Norte
- Intermunic. comm.: Tâmega e Sousa
- District: Viseu
- Parishes: 11

Government
  - President: Manuel Garcez Trindade (PS)

Area
  - Total: 123.35 km^{2} (47.63 sq mi)

Population (2011)
  - Total: 11,364
  - Density: 92.128/km^{2} (238.61/sq mi)
- Time zone: UTC+00:00 (WET)
  - Summer (DST): UTC+01:00 (WEST)
- Website: www.cm-resende.pt

Resende (European Portuguese pronunciation: [ʁɛˈzẽdɨ]) is a municipality in the Viseu District in Portugal. The population in 2011 was 11,364, in an area of 123.35 km^{2}.

The present mayor is Manuel Garcez Trindade, elected by the Socialist Party. The municipal holiday is September 29.

== Demographics ==
Population of Resende Municipality (1801 – 2004)
1801	1849	1900	1930	1960	1981	1991	2001	2011
4128	3506	19334	21894	20226	15356	13675	12370	11364

== Parishes ==
Administratively, the municipality is divided into 11 civil parishes (freguesias):

- Anreade e São Romão de Aregos
- Barrô
- Cárquere
- Felgueiras e Feirão
- Freigil e Miomães
- Ovadas e Panchorra
- Paus
- Resende
- São Cipriano
- São João de Fontoura
- São Martinho de Mouros

== Famous people ==
- Edgar Cardoso (1913 in Resende – 2000 in Porto) a noted civil engineer and university professor.
