= List of highways in Portugal =

The following is a list of highways in Portugal. The Portuguese highway system is well spread out over the country. As well as the following roads it includes many national 2 lane roads.

== Autoestrada (motorway/freeway) ==
Motorway	Direction	Route
A1	north/south	Lisbon to Porto
A2	north/south	Lisbon to Faro
A3	north/south	Porto to the Spanish border in the direction of Vigo
A4	east/west	Porto to Bragança and to the Spanish border in the direction of Zamora
A5	east/west	Lisbon to Cascais
A6	east/west	Begins when the A2 makes a downward turn and goes to the Spanish border by Elvas
A7	east/west	Póvoa de Varzim to Vila Pouca de Aguiar
A8	north/south	Lisbon to Leiria
A8-1	north/south	Leiria Norte to Pousos
A9	north/south	Oeiras to Alverca, it is also the outer-loop of the Lisbon Area.
A10	north/south	A9 to connect to A13
A11	north/south	Braga to Guimarães
A12	east/west	Loures to Setúbal
A13	north/south	Setúbal to Santarém
A13-1	east/west	Connects A1 and A13 motorways near Coimbra
A14	east/west	Coimbra to Figueira da Foz
A15	east/west	Santarém to Peniche
A16	north/south	Cascais to Belas, Sintra
A17	north/south	Aveiro - Marinha Grande/A8
A19	north/south	Leiria to São Jorge, Porto de Mós
A20	north/south	Vila Nova de Gaia to Porto
A21	east/west	Ericeira to Venda do Pinheiro
A22	east/west	Algarve coast through Faro
A23	L shaped	from the A1 by Torres Novas to Guarda
A24	north/south	Viseu to Chaves and on to the Spain border
A25	east/west	Aveiro to Vilar Formoso through Viseu & Guarda
A26	east/west	Sines to Ferreira do Alentejo
A27	east/west	Viana do Castelo to Ponte de Lima
A28	north/south	Porto to Viana do Castelo
A29	north/south	Porto to Ovar but is expected to continue to hug the coast until Aveiro
A32	north/south	Oliveira de Azeméis to Vila Nova de Gaia
A33	east/west	Costa da Caparica to Montijo
A35	east/west	Santa Comba Dão to Canas de Senhorim
A41	Circular	Matosinhos to Espinho
A42	east/west	Lordelo to Felgueiras
A43	northwest/southeast	Porto to Gondomar
A44	north/south	Vila Nova de Gaia (Valadares to Freixo)
VRI	north/south	Custoias to Porto Airport

== Itinerário principal (principal itinerary) ==
Number	Direction	Route
IP1	north\south	designated as A3, A1, A12, A2 and A22; Valenca to Vila Real de Santo Antonio through Oporto, Lisbon and Faro
IP2	north\south	Faro to Bragança
IP3	north\south	designated partially as A14&A24 and as itself from Coimbra to Viseu
IP4	west\east	A4 and the remaining road to Bragança and Spain
IP5	west\east	designated as A25
IP6	west\east	designated as A23
IP7	west\east	designated as A6
IP8	west\east	Ficalho to Sines, through Beja
IP9	west\east	designated as A27

== Itinerário complementar (complementary itinerary) ==
Number	Direction	Route
IC1	north\south	Albufeira to Setúbal then on to Lisbon and Spain
IC2	north\south	designated as N1
IC3	north\south	Entroncamento to the IC8
IC4	L shape	extension of A22 to run to Aljezur and as its own road to Sines
IC5	west\east	designated as A7
IC6	west\east	Santa Comba Dão to Celorico da Beira
IC7	east/west	Penacova to Oliveira do Hospital
IC8	east/west	Pombal to Vila Velha de Rodao
IC9	west\east	Alcobaça to Tomar
IC10	west\east	Santarém to Estremoz - designated as A13
IC11	west\east	Torres Vedras to Marateca
IC12	north/south	Sta. Comba Dao to Nelas
IC13	east/west	western Setúbal to Alcochete and then in another chunk from Mora to Ponte de Sor and in yet another chunk from Portalegre to Valencia de Alcántara in Spain
IC14	west\east	Barcelos to Braga - designated as A11
IC15	west\east	Lisbon to Cascais - designated as A5
IC16	west\east	Bairro Da Coopalme to Idanha - designated in part as A16
IC17	inner loop	CRIL inner loop of the Lisbon Area - designated as A36
IC18	outer loop	CREL outer loop of the Lisbon area - designated as A9
IC19	west\east	Ranholas to Bucara - designated as A37
IC20	west\east	Almada to Costa da Caparica - designated as A38
IC21	north\south	Vila Amélia to Barreiro - designated as A39
IC22	north\south	Olival Basto to Montemor- designated as A40
IC23	Inner loop	Oporto Ponte da Arrábida to Oporto Ponte de Freixo - as A1\A20\A44
IC24	outer loop	Oporto outer loop Espinho to Perafita - designated as A41
IC25		
IC26		
IC27	north\south	Trindade to Monte Francisco
IC28	west\east	Real Baixo to Lama
IC29	west\east	Bonjoia to Covelo - designated as A43
IC30	west\east	Bairro Da Alegria to Bairro Da Coopalme - designated as part of A16
IC31		
IC32	west\east	Caparica to Vale Da Resina - designated as A33
