= Roads in Portugal =

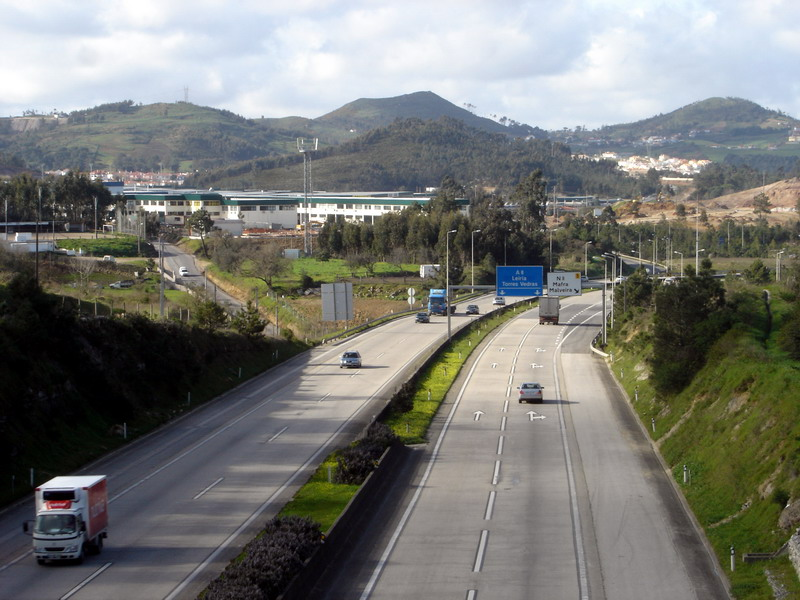
A8 motorway, near Malveira

Roads in Portugal are defined by the Plano Rodoviário Nacional (PRN, English: National Road Plan), which describes the existing and planned network of Portuguese roads. The present plan in force is the 2000 National Road Plan (PRN 2000), approved in 1998. It replaced PRN 1985, which itself had replaced PRN 1945.

The Portuguese road infrastructure was considered the best in Europe and the second best in the world by the World Economic Forum in its Global Competitiveness Report for 2014–2015. In the 2017–2018 report, it was considered to 8th best in the world. Nevertheless, all of these data were obtained through nothing more than an opinion survey of selected business executives.

The scenic road between Peso da Régua and Pinhão, in Trás-os-Montes region, was considered the world's best driving road, according to the Avis Driving Index. This road is a section of the N 222 which follows the Douro Valley.

== History of road classification in Portugal ==
=== First road plans ===
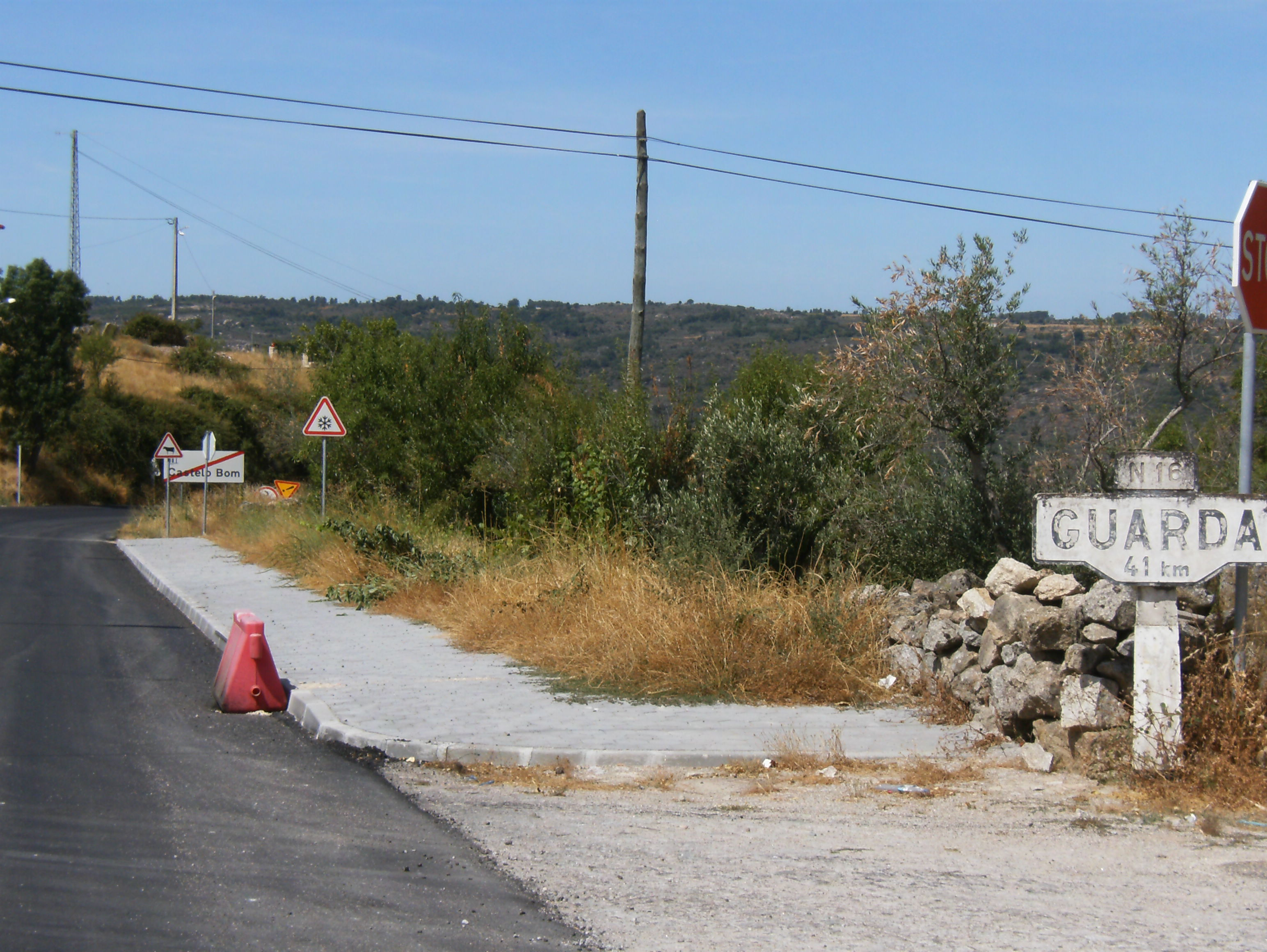
Section of the old road between Aveiro and Vilar Formoso. Completed in the 1930s as the National Road No. 8 of 1st class (EN 8-1ª), it became the National Road No. 16 (N 16) under PRN 1945. For decades, this was the most-direct road link between Portugal and the rest of Europe.

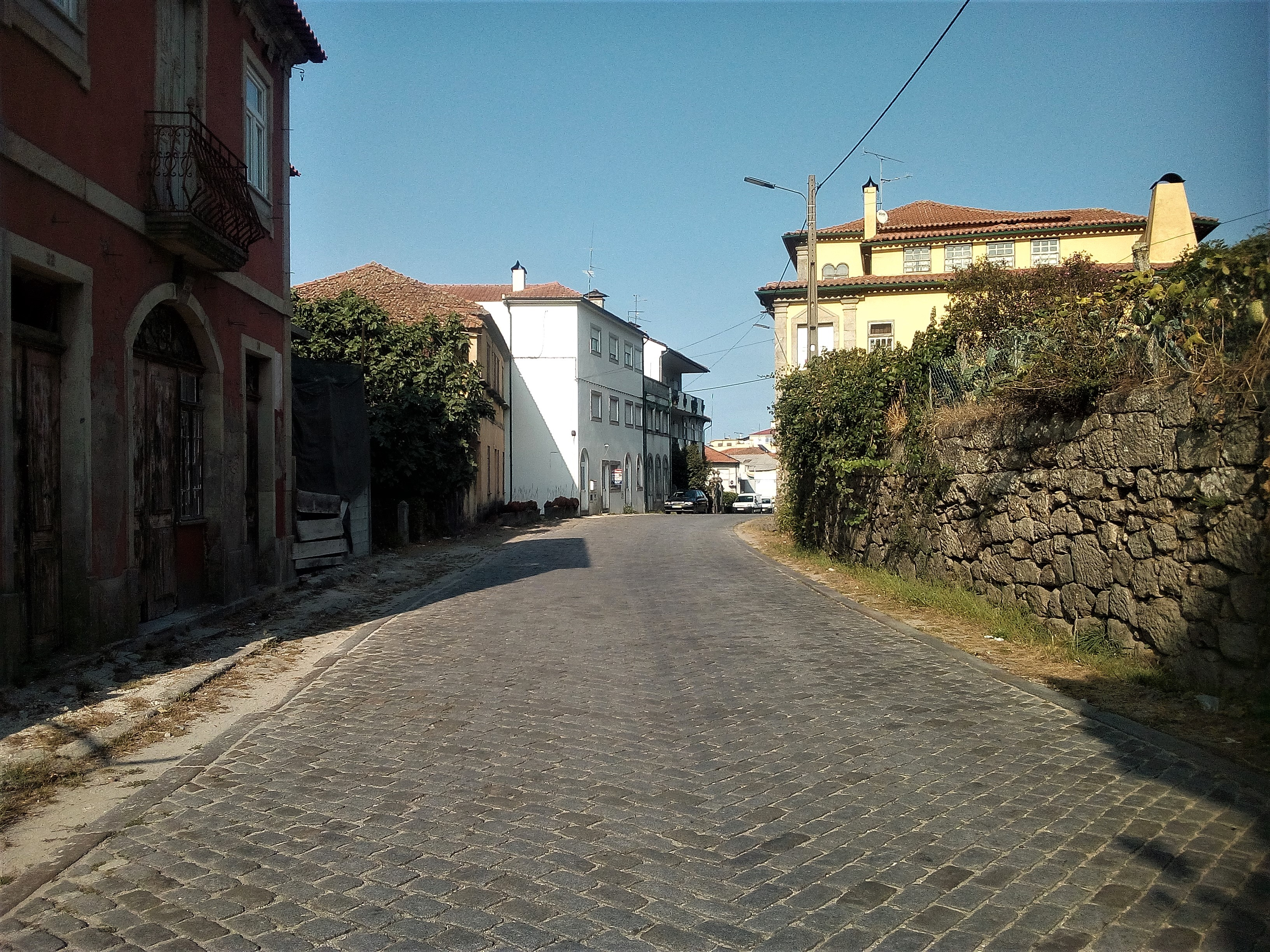
Section of the N 16 in Oliveira de Frades, paved in granite blocks which were typical of the original national roads in Portugal

The first road plans in Portugal date back from 1843 and 1848, and were based on 18th century plans which prioritized connections between Lisbon and strategic points of the country, and as a support for fluvial routes. The planned network was classified in 1850 into estradas (roads) and caminhos (paths), with the estradas being classified as 1st and 2nd class. Caminhos were routes of merely local interest.

In 1862, the existing and planned roads were classified as 1st class roads or estradas reais (royal roads), 2nd class roads or estradas distritais (district roads), and estradas municipais (municipal roads). The estradas reais were those with direct or indirect (via railways, for instance) origin in Lisbon and were managed by the State. The estradas distritais were managed by the districts while estradas municipais were managed by the municipalities.

With the abolition of the monarchy in 1910, the estradas reais were renamed estradas nacionais (national roads).

In 1913, the Law of 22 February established a commission to study a new classification of the roads and propose guidelines to establish that classification. However, despite these efforts, many routes were not clearly classified and the condition of most roads was chaotic. Widespread use of the automobile in the 1920s created new pressure for reforming the Portuguese road network.

In 1926, under the Ditadura Nacional regime, a provisional General Plan of National Roads of 1st and 2nd class was established by Decree No. 12,100 of 31 July 1926, according to what was previewed by the Law of 22 February 1913. Both the 1st and 2nd class roads would be designated estradas nacionais, with the term estrada distrital disappearing. They were designated EN xx-x (for estradas nacionais followed by the number of the road and its class). This plan established 23 roads of 1st class (designated EN 1-1ª to EN 23-1ª) and 112 roads of 2nd class (designated EN 1-2ª to EN 112-2ª). The definite General Plan of National Roads was approved by Decree No. 16,075 of 30 September 1928. It kept the 23 1st class roads and the 112 2nd class ones, but some roads were rerouted, extended, or truncated.

The 1st class national roads included in the 1928 General Plan of National Roads were the following:

Number	Route
EN 1-1ª	Porto – Viana do Castelo – the margin of Minho river – São Gonçalo border
EN 2-1ª	Porto – Braga – Monção
EN 3-1ª	Viana do Castelo – Lindoso (border)
EN 4-1ª	Viana do Castelo – Braga – Bragança – Bridge over Maçãs river (border)
EN 5-1ª	Braga – Guimarães – Amarante – Vila Real – Bragança – França (border)
EN 6-1ª	Porto – Penafiel – Régua – Barca de Alva
EN 7-1ª	São Pedro do Sul – Vila Real – Chaves – border
EN 8-1ª	Aveiro – Viseu – Guarda – Almeida – Vilar Formoso (border)
EN 9-1ª	Buarcos – Figueira da Foz – Coimbra – Moncorvo – Podence
EN 10-1ª	Porto – Coimbra – Leiria – Caldas da Rainha – Loures – Lisbon
EN 11-1ª	Malveira – Ericeira – Sintra – Cascais – Algés (Lisbon)
EN 12-1ª	Lisbon – Santarém – Castelo Branco – Salvaterra do Extremo (border)
EN 13-1ª	Barreiro – Aldeia Galega – Almeirim – Barreiras do Tejo (Abrantes)
EN 14-1ª	Torres Novas – Abrantes – Proença-a-Nova
EN 15-1ª	Guarda – Castelo Branco – Portalegre
EN 16-1ª	Peniche – Santarém – Coruche – Évora
EN 17-1ª	Fronteira – Portalegre – Évora – Beja
EN 18-1ª	Aldeia Galega – Vendas Novas – Elvas – Bridge over Caia river (border)
EN 19-1ª	Cacilhas – Setúbal – Alcácer do Sal – Ferreira do Alentejo – São Brás de Alportel – Faro
EN 20-1ª	Alcácer do Sal – Grândola – Odemira – Lagos
EN 21-1ª	Sines – Ferreira do Alentejo – Moura – Rosal da Cristina (border)
EN 22-1ª	Odemira – Ourique – Mértola – Mina de São Domingos
EN 23-1ª	Lagos – Faro – Vila Real de Santo António

By Law No. 3,969 of 20 July 1927, the Junta Autónoma das Estradas (JAE, English: Autonomous Road Board) was created to study the condition of the Portuguese road network. The preliminary report was clear to state that from the 16,000 kilometres (9,900 mi) of the planned national road network, 4,000 km (2,500 mi) were to be completed and from the 12,000 km (7,500 mi) already built, 10,000 km (6,200 mi) were in an almost-ruined condition.

In 1933, roads were reclassified as estradas nacionais (1st and 2nd class), estradas municipais and caminhos públicos (public paths), with the latter two under municipal management.

=== 1945 National Road Plan ===
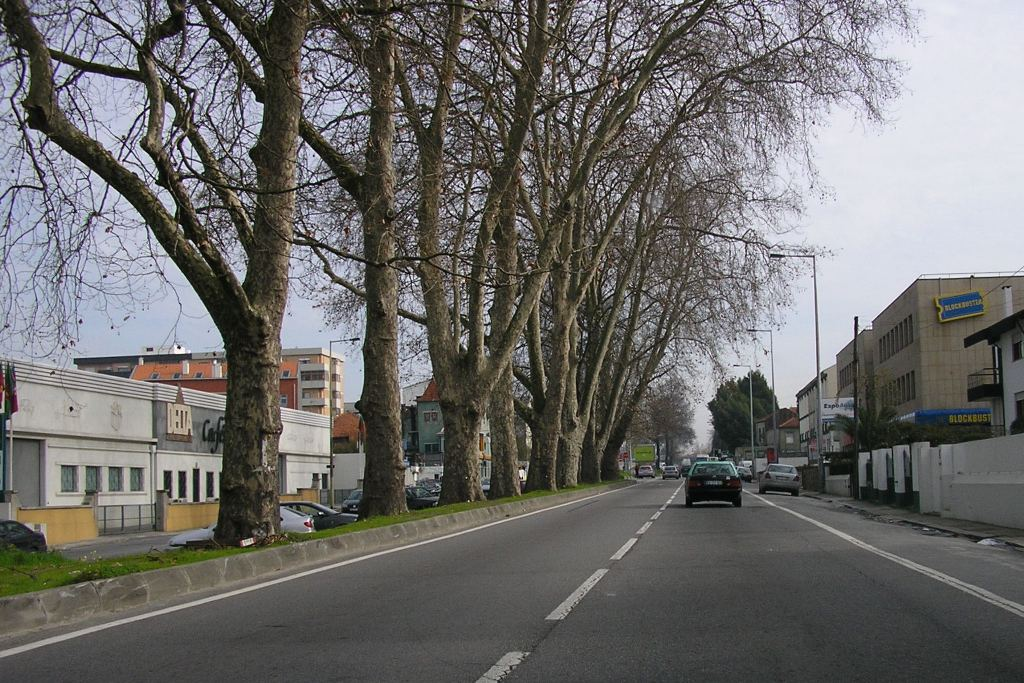
N12 is an Porto ring road and a first-class National Road according to PRN 1945. It is to be converted into a boulevard.

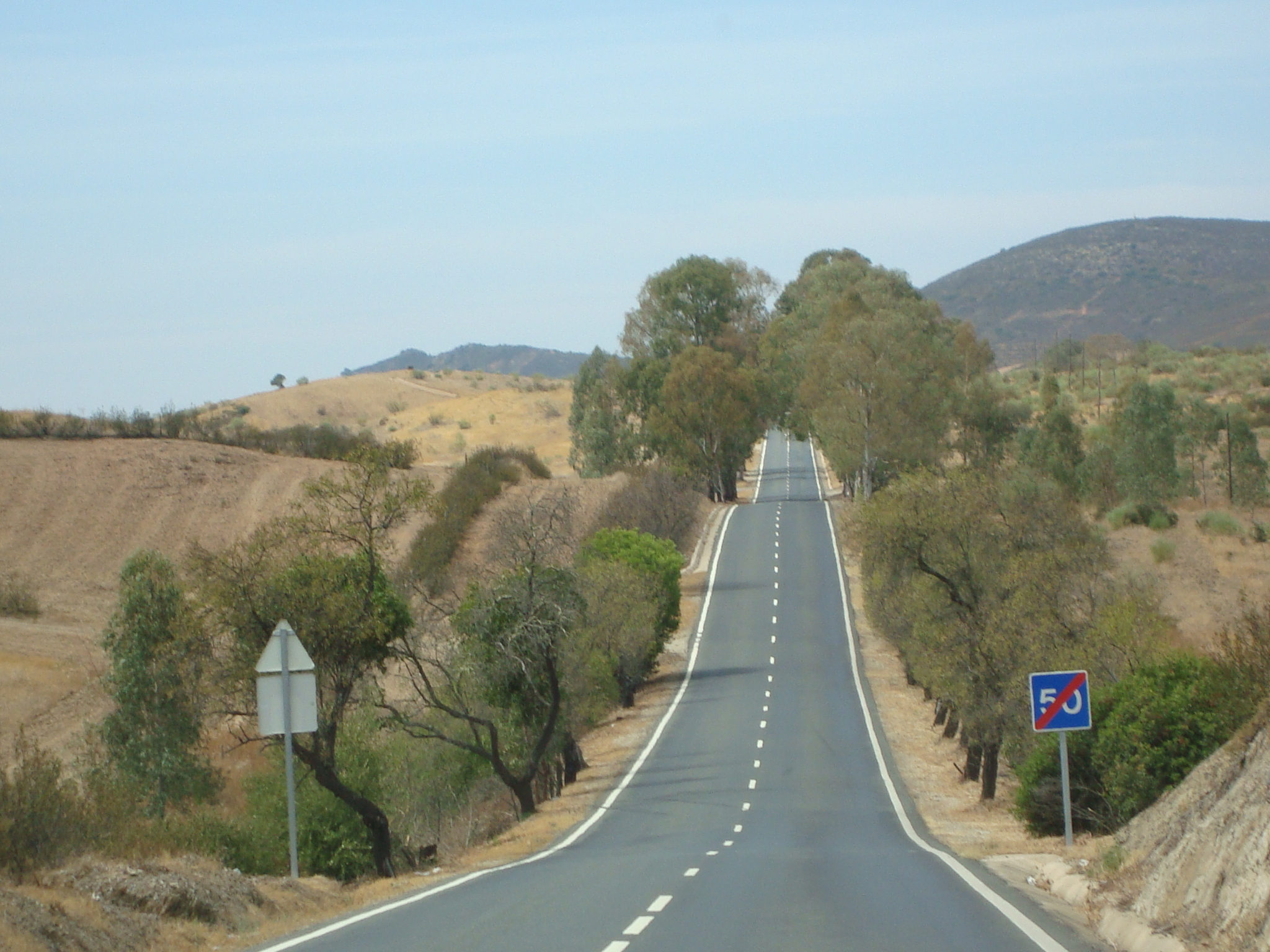
N122 (Beja–Vila Real de Santo António) was a 1st-class National Road.

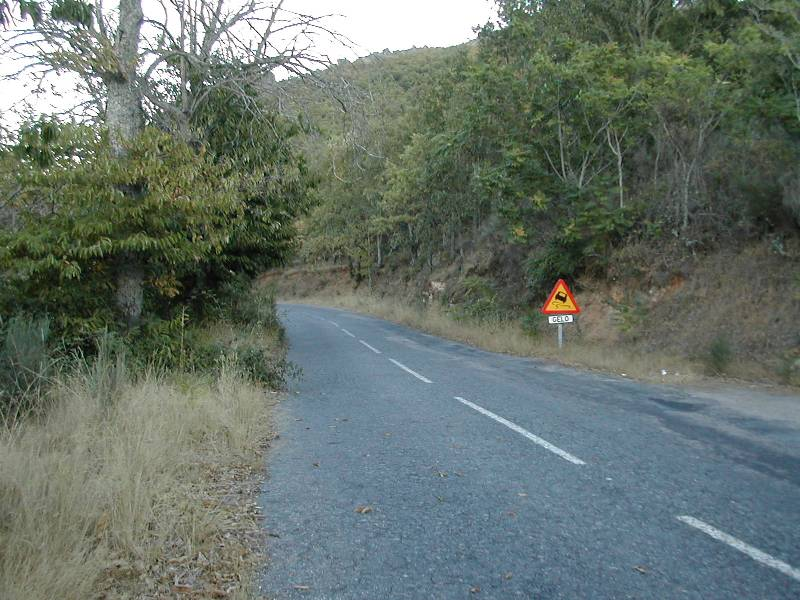
N217 is a 2nd-class National Road in Trás-os-Montes e Alto Douro.

In 1933, the entire (i.e. built and planned) network of national roads totalled 16,900 km (10,500 mi). The state recognized the importance of the road network and, in 1945, created the first real national road plan, the Plano Rodoviário Nacional de 1945 (PRN 45), defined in Law No. 34,593 of 11 May 1945. This plan comprised a national road network of 20,597 km (12,798 mi).

PRN 1945 classified the national road network in Rede Fundamental (Fundamental Network) and Rede Complementar (Complementary Network). The latter served to support the fundamental network. Roads were classified according to the following:

- Fundamental Network: Estradas nacionais (EN or N)
  - 1st-class roads:
    - Principal routes (itinerários principais): N 1 to N 18
    - Other first-class roads: N 101 to N 125
  - 2nd-class roads:
    - N 201 to N 270
- Complementary Network: Estradas nacionais (EN or N)
  - 3rd-class roads:
    - N 301 to N 398
    - N X–Y . Branch roads, emerging from a determined road, which was identified by X, with a number of order according to point of origin, identified by Y. The road with most branch roads was N 1 , originally with 16 roads numbered N 1–1 to N 1–16 . (In 1961 N 1–1 and N 1–2 were renamed as N 10–7 and N 10–6 , respectively. However, later N 1–17 and N 1–18 were created, so N 1 resumed the record for 16 branches). These roads were planned to cover distances rarely longer than 20 km (12 mi), closing some road grids, and connecting locations of some demographic importance which are not covered by the "parent" road such as less-important border crossings, railway stations, and seaports. There were 438 branch roads.

The National Roads Statutes were subsequently approved in 1949.

In 1961, separate legislation (Law No. 2110 of 19 August 1961) on municipal roads defined new guidelines on construction, maintenance, and commercialization of these roads, and those were classified as following:

- Estradas municipais (EM or M):
  - M 501 – M 999 , following a district sequence, so the sequence 501 and over was repeated in every district. Municipal Roads could have also Branch Roads, following the same rules as for National Roads
- Caminhos públicos or, from 1961, caminhos municipais (CM)
  - CM 1001 and on, with the same numbering rules as Municipal Roads

The Main Roads could be, by law, upgraded to 4 lanes with central separation, if necessary. In fact this happened before PRN 1945, with the N7 motorway (now the A5) between Lisbon and the National Stadium completed in 1944, and in 1961 with the first 25 km (16 mi) of N1 motorway (now A1) between Lisbon and Vila Franca de Xira. The first urban highways were built in the 1960s. Nevertheless, most motorways built before 1985 had no number at all.

The road classes were distinguished using colour codes: red for first class, blue for second class, green for third class, yellow for municipal roads, and brown for municipal paths. These colours were applied as the basis of the location markers and occasionally in the background of the road numbers. The numbering distribution for main roads was according to the importance of its route in the network, and for N101 and over were numbered in a north-to-south fashion.

The length of the roads had no relation with its class (except for branch roads, which were usually short), with existing 3rd-class roads longer than 100 km (62 mi), and main roads with as short as 8 km (5.0 mi), like the N7 highway, now part of A5. The longest road of the 1945 Plan was N2, connecting Chaves to Faro, extending for 738 km (459 mi).

According to PRN 1945, there were 18 Main Roads, designated N1 through N18.

Number	Route	Length	Notes
N 1	Lisbon – Vila Franca de Xira – Leiria – Pombal – Coimbra – Albergaria-a-Velha – Porto (northern end of upper deck of D. Luís Bridge)	Originally about 320 km (200 mi); 307 km (191 mi) between Lisbon and the northern end of Av. da República in Vila Nova de Gaia	On the 1945 National Roadway Plan, this was Portugal's main road, connecting Lisbon and Porto. Originally crossing the towns or city centres on its route, over the years many bypass roads have been built to avoid urban traffic. In 1961, the new motorway section between Lisbon and Vila Franca de Xira, part of the future Lisbon–Porto motorway, was integrated into the N1. The original route became an extension of the N10. The N1 classification for the referred branch of A1 had been kept until 1985, thereafter the N1 road had its starting point at the level of km 26. Also during the 1960s, a more direct and straight connection between Venda das Raparigas (Benedita, Alcobaça) and São Jorge (Porto de Mós) has been built. The original route was reclassified, in 1973, as N 8–6 (Venda das Raparigas–Alcobaça, or more properly Alcobaça–Venda das Raparigas) and N 8 (Alcobaça–vicinity of São Jorge), thus extending its route farther north. According to PRN 1985, most parts of this road have been included on IC2, signed as IC2/N1. Some sections which aren't common with IC2 are intended for local traffic, or are parts parallel to auto-estrada sections of IC2.
N 2	Chaves – Vila Real – Viseu – Penacova – Abrantes – Ponte de Sor – Montemor-o-Novo – Ferreira do Alentejo – Almodôvar – Faro	738 km (459 mi)	The longest road of Portugal according to 1945 National Roadway Plan, connecting north to south, "cutting" the country halfway between west and east and crossing eleven of the eighteen districts of Portugal. In Trás-os-Montes and Viseu district N2 crossed district capitals (Vila Real and Viseu) and medium-sized cities (Chaves and Lamego) but south of that regions (i.e. roughly for the remaining 500 km), the road ran far from any major city until near its end in Faro. N2 never had an autonomous traffic that justified its importance in the 1945 Plan and the long national road became a sequential collection of regional sections. The failure of N2 proved that the major link between the Northern and Southern regions of Portugal should always cross Lisbon area (as happens nowadays with IP1 and IC1). In the 1985 and 2000 National Road Plans, IP3 (a single- or dual-carriageway highway) runs parallel to N2 in Trás-os-Montes and Viseu district, but south of that no major road follows the former N2 axis. Currently, almost all sections of N2 have been downgraded to regional or municipal roads. The route classified as N2 by 1945 had been fully asphalted from the 1930s to 1944. Many branches had been replaced in importance by the 1985 Plan's IP routes, some renamed as Estrada Regional (R 2), some were municipalized and some classified as historical patrimony. Due to its characteristics, N2 is nicknamed Portuguese Route 66. In November 2015, a trans-regional project called Rota da Estrada Nacional 2 had been signed by eleven of the thirty-six municipalities along its route (although all municipalities will be part of the project). It aims to promote the past part of Portugal's inland crossed by the road for its importance to tourism, culture and gastronomy.
N 3	Carregado (N1) – Santarém – Torres Novas – Vila Velha de Rodão – Castelo Branco (N18)	213 km (132 mi)	It was the most direct connection between Lisbon (Carregado is located at km 33 of N 1) and the most important cities of the former provinces of Ribatejo, Beira Baixa, and Beira Alta, the latter through N18, which this road meets in Sernadas do Ródão.
N 4	Montijo – Vendas Novas – Estremoz – Elvas – Caia	182 km (113 mi); 194 km (121 mi) projected	The original project of this road included a bridge over the Tagus River, in order to directly connect Lisbon with Alentejo and the border of Caia, near Badajoz, where it would meet the Spanish N-V. The bridge was never built and this road starts at the level of km 12.
N 5	Montijo – Marateca – Alcácer do Sal – Barragem do Vale de Gaio – N2	87 km (54 mi)	Projected to connect the Lisbon region into the south of Portugal, through N2, which this road would meet in Torrão; later it was decided that this road would run through Vale do Gaio Dam. The connection between Vale do Gaio Dam and N2 was never built, but the route through Torrão was built and reclassified as N5-2.
N 6	Lisbon – Paço de Arcos – Parede – Estoril – Cascais	25 km (16 mi)	The famous seaside Road of Cascais/Estoril Coast, also known as Avenida Marginal on most of its route. It is designed as a four lane, two in either direction. This road was projected to include the former Lisbon ringroad on its route.
N 7	Lisbon – National Stadium	8 km (5.0 mi)	Original name of the A5, the first Portuguese motorway, inaugurated in 1944. It was only extended into Cascais in 1991 when it became known as A5.
N 8	Lisbon – Loures – Torres Vedras – Óbidos – Caldas da Rainha – Alcobaça – Cruz da Légua – IC2 / N1	131 km (81 mi)	Connects Lisbon to the West Region. Originally this road ended in Alcobaça, meeting there N 1 (see N 1 for details).
N 9	Cascais (N6) – Sintra – Torres Vedras – Alenquer (N1)	98 km (61 mi)	Crosses the northern region of Lisbon. Along with N 6 (Lisbon–Cascais), N 1 (Alenquer–Vila Franca de Xira), N 10 (Vila Franca de Xira–Lisbon), and the riverside streets of Lisbon, it forms a ring road around the Lisbon region.
N 10	Almada – Setúbal – Vila Franca de Xira – Lisbon	141 km (88 mi)	A ring road that connects the south bank of Tagus to Lisbon, via Marechal Carmona Bridge (Vila Franca de Xira). From 1961, it classified the original route of N1 between Vila France de Xira and Lisbon.
N 11	Montijo – Barreiro	10 km (6.2 mi); 32 km (20 mi) projected	Short-distance road in the south bank of Tagus. The original plan included a connection from Barreiro to Trafaria which was never built. It was renamed as R11.
N 12	Matosinhos – Rio Tinto	17 km (11 mi)	Porto ring road, to be cvted into a boulevard.
N 13	Porto – Viana do Castelo – Valença	115 km (71 mi)	Road crossing the northwest region of Portugal, with an almost seaside route. The first 5 km (3.1 mi) of this road, shared with N14, had been upgraded into a dual carriageway in the 1970s and are known as Via Norte.
N 14	Porto – Braga	56 km (35 mi)	The first 5 km of this road, shared with N13, had been upgraded into a dual carriageway in the 1970s and are known as Via Norte.
N 15	Ermesinde – Amarante – Vila Real – Mirandela – Bragança	240 km (150 mi)	The main road from Porto to the region of Trás-os-Montes e Alto Douro, until the construction of IP4.
N 16	Aveiro – Viseu – Guarda – Vilar Formoso	224 km (139 mi)	Connects Aveiro to the most-important border with Spain. From the 1970s, the road was considered obsolete due to several kilometres of congested traffic on the approach to the border. As an alternative IP5 was built between 1983 and 1991, but this road proved to be highly dangerous and was cvted into an autoestrada, also known as A25.
N 17	Coimbra – Celorico da Beira (N16)	131 km (81 mi)	Connects Coimbra with the Beira Alta region, crossing the outskirts of Serra da Estrela. Popularly known as Estrada da Beira.
N 18	Guarda – Castelo Branco – Portalegre – Estremoz – Évora – Beja – Ourique – Ervidel (N2)	380 km (240 mi)	Crosses the most important cities in the far east of Portugal, connects with N 2 in Ervidel. Many branches were included on IP2.

=== 1985 National Road Plan ===
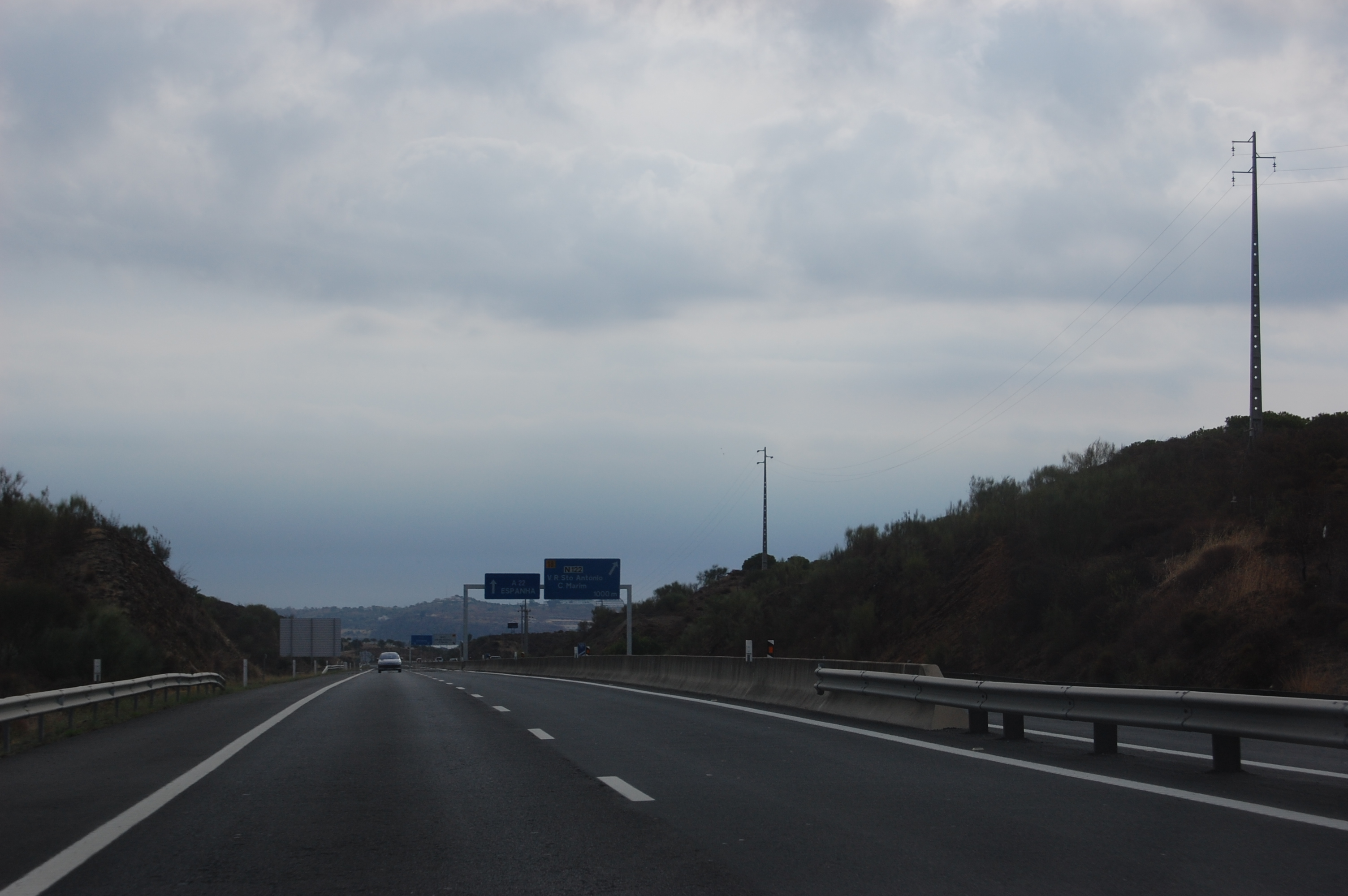
The A22 motorway, in the Algarve, was originally signed as IP1. During the 1980s and 1990s, only tolled highways were typically marked Axx, while the other highways were signed as IPxx or ICxx.

From the 1960s, many routes were assumed to be somewhat outdated, so in 1972, Brisa was created to manage a projected network of motorways, which by that time didn't reach a length of 100 km (62 mi). New sections of motorways were then built in the 1970s and the early 1980s, like the Vila Franca de Xira–Carregado (1977), Carregado–Aveiras de Cima (1980), Condeixa-a-Nova–Mealhada (1982, which permitted bypassing the city centre of Coimbra), Santa Maria da Feira–Carvalhos (1980) and Albergaria-a-Velha–Santa Maria da Feira (1983) sections; these would become part of the A1 motorway and the extension of the A2 motorway into Setúbal (between 1978 and 1979).

However, the whole road network was seen to be increasingly inadequate to properly serving the whole country. While Portugal was preparing to enter the EEC, the replacement for PRN 1945 was created by the Law 380/85 of 25 September 1985, the Plano Rodoviário Nacional de 1985 (English: 1985 National Roadway Plan) or PRN 1985.

The road network would again comprise the Rede Fundamental (English: Fundamental Network), composed of nine itinerários principais (principal routes), designated IP1 through IP9, which totalized 2,635 km (1,637 mi).

The non-motorway sections of the itinerários principais started to be identified with green background direction signs and green background IPx road numbers. In the late 1990s, although the background of the direction signs continued to be green, the IPx road numbers started to be put on red background rectangles.

Number	Route	Length (km)
IP 1	Valença – Braga – Porto – Aveiro – Coimbra – Leiria – Santarém – Lisbon – Montijo – Setúbal – Aljustrel – Faro – Castro Marim	734
IP 2	Portelo – Bragança – Guarda – Covilhã – Castelo Branco – Portalegre – Évora – Beja – Faro	564
IP 3	Vila Verde da Raia – Vila Real – Lamego – Viseu – Coimbra – Figueira da Foz	279
IP 4	Porto – Vila Real – Bragança – Quintanilha	237
IP 5	Aveiro – Viseu – Guarda – Vilar Formoso	204
IP 6	Peniche – Caldas da Rainha – Rio Maior – Santarém – Torres Novas – Abrantes – Castelo Branco	219
IP 7	Lisbon – Setúbal – Évora – Estremoz – Elvas – Caia	225
IP 8	Sines – Santiago do Cacém – Beja – Serpa – Vila Verde de Ficalho	154
IP 9	Viana do Castelo – Ponte de Lima – Braga – Guimarães – Amarante – Vila Real	161

The itinerários principais was set to be of restricted access, forbidding pedestrian, animal, and bicycle traffic, but exceptions could be accepted, especially for sections resulting from the reclassification of former national roads into IP network.

Such a classification was proposed before the publication of PRN 1985. In the early 1980s, the first branches of the future IP routes were built. These were a 12 km (7.5 mi) loop road alternative to N16 between Mangualde and Prime (Viseu) for IP5 route, built in 1983, and another branch built in 1981 that was integrated on the N2 route but later became part of IP3, between Oliveira do Mondego and Chamadouro when Aguieira Dam was built.

The road network also included the Rede Complementar (Complementary Network) of 24 itinerários complementares (IC, English: complementary routes) and other roads. The "other roads" were the former PRN 1945 national roads not set to be transformed into IP or IC, neither set for declassification from the national road network. In practice, the "other roads" continued to be signed as estradas nacionais (N or EN). The Complementary Network was 4,807 km (2,987 mi) long.

The non-motorway roads of the Rede Complementar were signed with white background direction signs.

The PRN 1985 established 24 itinerários complementares, designated IC1 through IC24, which totalled 2,439 km (1,516 mi):

No.	Route	Length (km)
IC 1	Lisbon – Torres Vedras – Caldas da Rainha – Leiria – Figueira da Foz – Aveiro – Ovar – Espinho – Porto – Póvoa de Varzim – Viana do Castelo – Valença	450
IC 2	Lisbon – Rio Maior – Leiria – Coimbra – Mealhada – São João da Madeira – Argoncilhe – Porto	330
IC 3	Setúbal – Palmela – Montijo – Salvaterra de Magos – Almeirim – Entroncamento – Tomar – Penela – Condeixa- Coimbra (IP3)	235
IC 4	Sines – Lagos – Portimão – Faro	?
IC 5	Póvoa de Varzim (IC1) – Famalicão – Guimarães – Fafe – Vila Pouca de Aguiar – Murça – Vila Flor – Alfândega da Fé – Mogadouro – Miranda do Douro (border with Spain)	131
IC 6	Santa Comba Dão (IP3) – Venda de Galizes – Seia – Gouveia -Celorico da Beira (IP5)	?
IC 7	Coimbra – Penacova – Venda de Galizes – Covilhã (IP2)	?
IC 8	Figueira da Foz (IC1) – Pombal (IP1) – Figueiró dos Vinhos – Pedrógão Grande – Sertã – Proença-a-Nova – Castelo Branco – Segura (IP2)	118
IC 9	Alcobaça – Nazaré – Marinha Grande – Leiria – Ourém – Tomar	?
IC 10	Santarém (IP 1) – Almeirim – Coruche – Montemor-o-Novo – Estremoz (IP8)	151
IC 11	Torres Vedras – Vila Franca de Xira – Pegões – Marateca (IP1)	53
IC 12	Viseu (IP5) – Seia (IC6) – Covilhã (IP2)	?
IC 13	Coina (IP7) – Montijo (IP1) – Coruche – Mora – Ponte de Sor – Alter do Chão – Crato – Portalegre	?
IC 14	Barcelos – Braga	?
IC 15	Lisbon – Oeiras – Cascais	25
IC 16	Lisbon (CRIL – IC17) – Amadora – Belas – Alto Colaride – Sintra – Cascais	27
IC 17	Algés – Buraca – Olival de Basto – Sacavém (IP1)	21
IC 18	Caxias (IC15) – Queluz – Loures – Alverca (IP 1)	35
IC 19	Coina – Montijo – Alcochete	?
IC 20	Almada – Costa da Caparica	6
IC 21	Coina – Barreiro	7
IC 22	Olival Basto (IC17) – Montemor (CREL – IC18)	4
IC 23	Ponte da Arrábida – Avenida de Fernão de Magalhães – Ponte de Freixo – Avenida da República – IC1	21
IC 24	Porto (IC23) – Matosinhos – Moreira (IC1)	?

The whole network totalled 9,881 km (6,140 mi), with about 12,000 km (7,500 mi) of old PRN 1945 roads being declassified from the national road network.

As the PRN 1985 focused mainly on new roads to be built, no clear rules were established for a procedure regarding the old roads that were to be declassified. In practice, most of them continued to be managed by the national road agency, JAE, and continued to be designated estradas nacionais. Some of them were transferred to the management of local municipalities.

Until the early 1980s, the Portuguese motorways did not have a proper number, each being referred to by a name (with some sections that were part of an estrada nacional also using the respective Nxx number). The existing motorways at that time (all of them managed under concession) started to receive proper numbers of the type Axx. With the application of the PRN 1985, new motorways were built with a few of them being managed directly by JAE and not under concession like the majority. So, although all motorways were part of an IP or IC, only concessionated ones received the Axx number (whether tolled or not). This number was signalized and the IPxx or ICxx number was disused in the motorway signage. The other motorways – non-concessionated, and therefore, always non-tolled – were signalized with the IPxx or ICxx number. Until the 2000s, almost all motorways under concession were tolled, so during that period, a signed Axx number helped drivers know in advance whether a motorway was tolled.

All motorways were signed with blue background direction signs, independently of being part of the Rede Fundamental or the Rede Complementar.

In 1993, the reclassification of 600 km (370 mi) of roads in the IC network and about 1,700 km (1,100 mi) into other roads was proposed, but the optimizations of PRN 1985 were only realized with PRN 2000, which was initially proposed in 1996.

=== 2000 National Road Plan ===
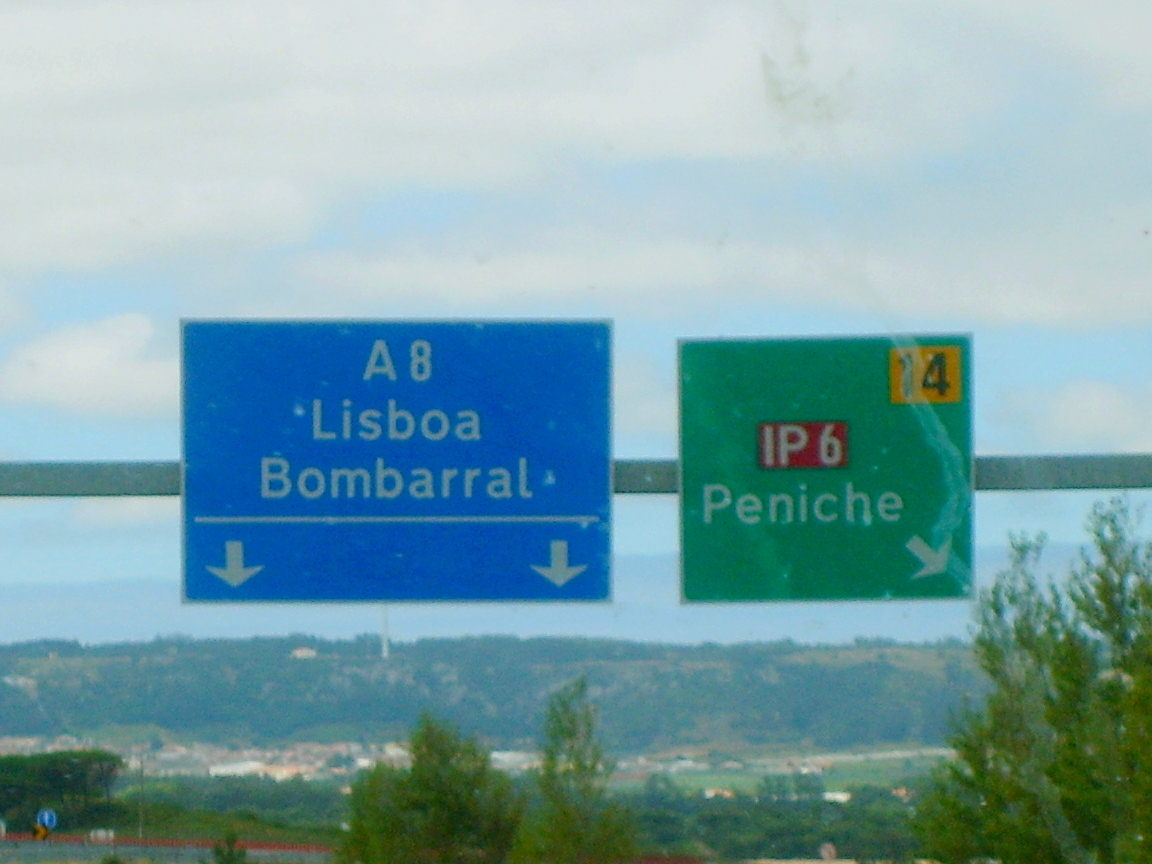
Typical signage of an autoestrada (left) and a non-highway IP road (right)

In spite of its name, Plano Rodoviário Nacional de 2000 (English: 2000 National Road Plan) or PRN 2000 was approved in 1998 and was published by Law No. 222/98 of 17 July 1998. This was essentially an optimization of the previous PRN 1985, with the addition of about 1,500 km (930 mi) of roads into the National Network, and the creation of the Rede Regional (Regional Network) of about 5,000 km (3,100 mi) of roads, as well as the identification of a Rede Nacional de Autoestradas (National Motorway Network), that, however, overlapped with the IP and IC network. The plan includes 16,500 km (10,300 mi) of roads.

The so-called "other roads" of the PRN 1985 disappeared from the PRN 2000, with the designation estradas nacionais becoming official again. A new kind of road, the estradas regionais (regional roads) was also introduced.

The Road Network is defined as following:

- Fundamental Network:
  - Itinerários principais 2,600 km (1,600 mi)
- Complementary Network:
  - Itinerários complementares 3,016 km (1,874 mi)
  - Estradas nacionais 5,513 km (3,426 mi)
- Regional Network:
  - Estradas regionais (sections of former estradas nacionais, which take the same numbering, i.e. ER 2 is a section of EN 2, if the road crosses more than one region, separate sections of the former National Road can be part of the Regional Network) c.5,000 km (3,100 mi)
- Rede Nacional de Autoestradas (National Highway Network)
  - Autoestradas (always part of IP and IC network)

IP and IC roads may have other designations, especially those integrated with the National Highway Network, where the "A" designation is preferred on traffic signage, except for some city or suburban highways.

Since its approval, the PRN 2000 was updated twice (in 1999 and in 2003).

== Current classification according PRN 2000 ==
=== Motorways ===
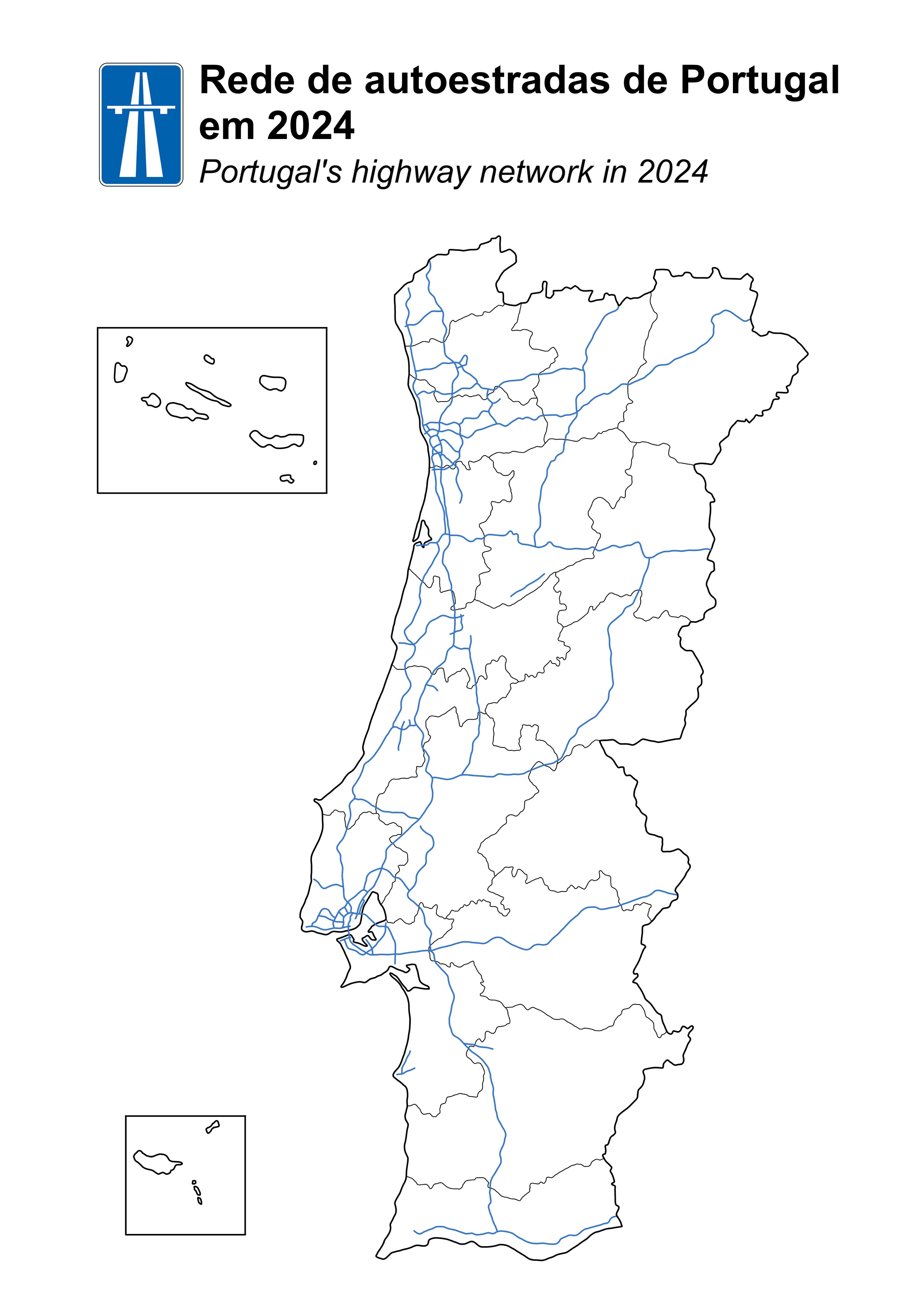
Motorway network map by 2024

Autoestrada is the Portuguese-language word for "motorway" or "freeway." Portugal has about 3,000 km (1,900 mi) of motorways, crossing all the coast and connecting the main inland cities and towns. Several autoestradas are linked with the Spanish motorway system and, through Spain, to the rest of Europe.

During the 1990s and early 2000s, Portugal was the country with the greatest development in the motorway network in the European Union. It had 316 km (196 mi) of motorways in 1990 and the number increased to 1,242 km (772 mi) by 1999 and 2,100 km (1,300 mi) by the end of 2007.

Although administratively a separate motorway network exists, in practice each autoestrada overlaps part or all of an IP (Itinerário Principal or Main Itinerary) or an IC (Itinerário Complementar or Complementary Itinerary). These are designated with an "A" code as well as an IP or an IC code, though they are typically only signalized by the A designation. In addition, many of these roads are part of the European road network, and so also carry an "E" designation, which may serve as reference for non-Portuguese drivers.

Label:

- – = in use
- – – = under construction
- – ** – = planned

Number	Designation	Route	Concurrency	Length	Constructed	Concessionaire
A 1	Autoestrada do Norte (Northern Motorway)	Lisbon – Santarém – Leiria – Coimbra – Aveiro – Porto	IP 1 (Lisbon – Carvalhos); IP 6 (Santarém/A 15 – Torres Novas/A 23; IC 1 (A 29 interchange – Porto); IC 2 (Carvalhos – Arrábida-Porto); IC 23 (Coimbrões-Gaia/A 44 – Arrábida-Porto/A 28)	303	1960–1991	Brisa
A 2	Autoestrada do Sul (Southern Motorway)	Lisbon / Ponte 25 de Abril – Marateca – Alcácer do Sal – Grândola – Ourique – Albufeira	IP 1 (Palmela/A 12 – Albufeira); IP 7 (Lisbon – Marateca/A 6-A 13)	240	1966–2002	Lusoponte (25 de Abril Bridge), Brisa
A 3	Autoestrada do Minho	Porto – Famalicão – Braga – Ponte de Lima – Valença	IP 11; IP 9 (Ponte de Lima/A 27 – Braga/A 11)	112	1989–1998	Brisa
A 4	Autoestrada Transmontana	Porto – Penafiel – Amarante – Vila Real – Mirandela – Bragança – Quintanilha	IP 4 IP 9 (Castelões/A 11 – Vila Real)	223	1990–2016	Ascendi; Brisa; Infraestruturas de Portugal; AEXXI
A 5	Autoestrada do Estoril	Lisbon – Oeiras – Cascais	IC 15	25	1944–1991	Brisa
A 6	Autoestrada do Alentejo	Marateca – Évora – Estremoz – Elvas – Caia	IP 7	159	1995–1999	Brisa
A 7	Autoestrada do Alvão	Vila do Conde – Famalicão – Guimarães – Fafe – Vila Pouca de Aguiar	IC 5	100	1994–2007	Ascendi
A 8	Autoestrada do Oeste (Western Motorway)	Lisbon – Caldas da Rainha – Leiria – A 1	IC 1 (Lisbon – Marinha Grande/A 17); IC 17-CRIL (Km 0-km 2); IC 36 (Marinha Grande/A 17 – Leiria/A 1)	138	1984–2011	AE do Atlântico
A 8-1	Circular Oriental de Leiria (COL) (Leiria Eastern Ring Road)	Pousos (A 8/A 1) – IC 2		3	1990s as COL	
A 9	Circular Regional Exterior de Lisboa (Lisbon Outer Ring Road)	Caxias (National Stadium) – Queluz – Loures – Alverca	IC 18	35	1994–1995	Brisa
A 10	Autoestrada do Ribatejo	Bucelas – Arruda dos Vinhos – Carregado – Benavente	IC 2 (Bucelas/A 9-CREL – Carregado); IC 11 (Carregado – Benavente/A 13)	40	2003–2007	Brisa
A 11		Apúlia – Braga – Guimarães – Penafiel	IC 14 (Apúlia/A 28 – Braga/A 3); IP 9 (Braga/A 3 – Castelões/A 4)	80	1998–2006	Ascendi
A 12		Lisbon / Ponte Vasco da Gama – Montijo -Setúbal	IP 1 (Lisbon – Palmela/A 2); IC 3 (Montijo – Setúbal)	41	1979–1998	Lusoponte (Vasco da Gama Bridge), Brisa
A 13		Marateca – Benavente – Salvaterra de Magos – Almeirim -**- Chamusca -**- Golegã -**- Vila Nova da Barquinha -(to be upgraded into dual carriageway)- A 23 – Tomar – Avelar – Condeixa – Coimbra	IC 3 (Coimbra – Canha/A 33); IC 11 (Benavente/A 10 – Marateca/A 2-A 6)	163 (206)	2002–?	Brisa (Almeirim-Marateca), Ascendi (A23-Coimbra)
A 13-1		A1 – Condeixa – A 13		10	2012	Ascendi
A 14	Autoestrada do Baixo Mondego	Figueira da Foz – Montemor-o-Velho – Coimbra	IP 3	40	1994–2002	Brisa
A 15		Óbidos – Rio Maior – Santarém – ** – Almeirim	IP 6 (Óbidos/A 8-Santarém/A 1); IC 10 (Santarém/A 1 – Almeirim)	51 (55)	1995–2001	AE do Atlântico
A 16		Lisbon – Pontinha – Sintra – Alcabideche	IC 16 (Lisbon – Sintra); IC 30 (Sintra – Alcabideche)	28	1995–2014	Ascendi
A 17	Autoestrada do Litoral Centro	Marinha Grande – Figueira da Foz – Mira – Aveiro	IC 1	100	2004–2008	Brisa; Ascendi
A 18		Torres Vedras – ** – Carregado	IC 11	(27)		–
A 19		Porto de Mós – Azóia – Leiria	IC 2	16	2010–2011	AE do Litoral Oeste
A 20	Circular Regional Interior do Porto (Porto Inner Ring Road)	Carvalhos – Ponte do Freixo – Francos	IP 1 (Carvalhos – Antas-Porto/A 3); IC 23 (Freixo-Porto – Francos-Porto/A 28)	17	1989–1995	AE do Douro Litoral
A 21		Malveira – Ericeira		21	2005–2008	Mafratlântico
A 22	Via do Infante de Sagres	Lagos – Portimão – Albufeira – Faro – Castro Marim	IP 1 (Tunes/A 2 – Castro Marim); IC 4 (Lagos – Loulé)	133	1991–2003	Euroscut Algarve
A 23	Autoestrada da Beira Interior	Torres Novas – Abrantes – Castelo Branco – Fundão – Covilhã – Guarda	IP 6 (Torres Novas/A 1 – Castelo Branco); IP 2 (Fratel – Guarda/A 25)	217	1993–2003	Scutvias
A 24	Autoestrada do Interior Norte	Coimbra – ** – Mealhada – ** – Viseu – Peso da Régua – Lamego – Vila Real – Chaves – Vila Verde da Raia	IP 3	162 (227)	1998–2010	Norscut
A 25	Autoestrada das Beiras Litoral e Alta	Aveiro – Viseu – Guarda – Vilar Formoso – border with Spain	IP 5	199	1991–2021	Ascendi
A 26	Autoestrada do Baixo Alentejo	Sines – – Santiago do Cacém – – Beja	IP 8 IC 33 (Sines – Santiago do Cacém)	11 (95)	1972–2012	AE do Baixo Alentejo
A26-1	Variante de Sines (Sines Bypass)	Sines – Vila Nova de Santo André	IP 8	9	2010–2017	AE do Baixo Alentejo
A 27		Viana do Castelo – Ponte de Lima	IP 9	24	2001–2005	AE do Norte Litoral
A 28	Autoestrada do Litoral Norte	Porto – Viana do Castelo – Caminha – ** – Valença	IC 1 IC 23 (Arrábida-Porto/A 1 – Francos-Porto)	93 (123)	1960–2008	AE do Norte Litoral
A 29	Autoestrada da Costa de Prata	Angeja – Ovar – Espinho – Vila Nova de Gaia	IC 1	53	1994–2009	Ascendi
A 30		Sacavém – Santa Iria de Azóia	IC 2	10	1998	Ascendi
A 31	Variante a Coimbra (Coimbra Bypass)	Coimbra (south) – Coimbra (north)	IC 2	5	1991	–
A 32	Autoestrada do Entre Douro e Vouga	Oliveira de Azeméis – Vila Nova de Gaia	IC 2	35	2011	AE do Douro Litoral
A 33	Circular Regional Interna da Península de Setúbal (Setúbal Peninsula Regional Ring Road)	Funchalinho – Coina – Montijo – ** – New Lisbon Airoport – ** – Canha	IC 3 (Montijo – Canha); IC 32 (Funchalinho – Montijo)	37 (59)	1998–2012	AE do Baixo Tejo
A 34		A 1 – Pombal	IC 8	5	1999	–
A 35		Mira – ** – Mealhada – ** – Mortágua – ** – Santa Comba Dão – Canas de Senhorim – ** – Mangualde	N 234 (1995–1998); IC 12 (1998–present)	19 (94)	1995–1998	–
A 36	Circular Regional Interior de Lisboa (Lisbon Inner Ring Road)	Algés – Odivelas – Sacavém	IC 17-CRIL	21	1995–2011	Ascendi
A 37	Radial de Sintra (Sintra Radial Road)	Lisbon – Queluz – Sintra	N 249 (1985–1994); IC 19 (1994–present)	16	1985–1994	Ascendi
A 38	Via Rápida da Caparica (Caparica Expressway)	Almada – Costa da Caparica	IC 20	6	1966	AE do Baixo Tejo
A 39	Via Rápida do Barreiro (Barreiro Expressway)	Coina – Barreiro – ** – Lisbon	IC 21	7 (23)	1980–1984	–
A 40		Olival Basto – Odivelas – Montemor	IC 22	4	1998	Ascendi
A 41	Circular Regional Exterior do Porto (Porto Outer Ring Road)	Perafita – Maia – Aguiar de Sousa – Argoncilhe – Espinho	IC 24	62	early 1990s – 2007	Ascendi; AE do Douro Litoral
A 42		Ermida (A 41) – Paços de Ferreira – Lousada	IC 25	20	2005–2006	Ascendi
A 43		Porto – Gondomar – Aguiar de Sousa (A 41)	IC 29	9	2005–2011	AE do Douro Litoral
A 44		Gulpilhares (A 29) – Vila Nova de Gaia – Oliveira do Douro (A 20)	IC 23	9	2000–2007	Ascendi; AE Douro Litoral
VRI	Via Regional Interior (Porto) (Inner Regional Expressway)	Francisco Sá Carneiro Airport – Custóias (A 4)		3	2006	Ascendi

==== Tolls and taxation ====
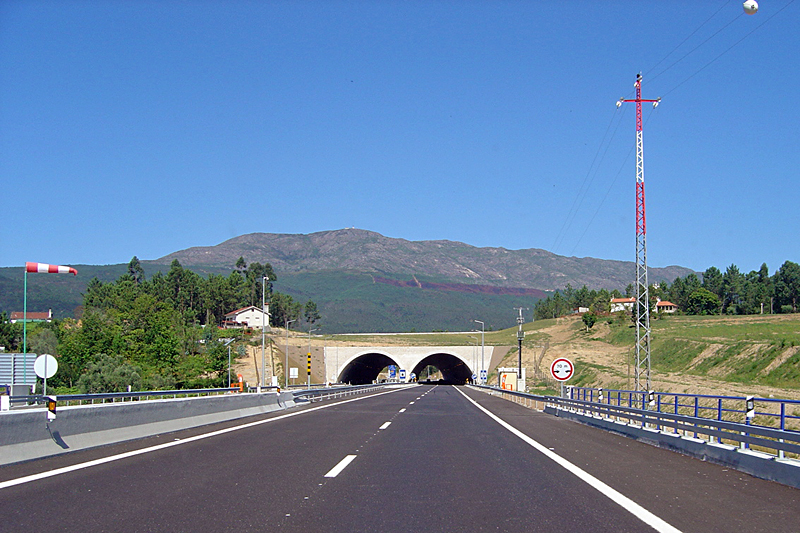
A27 (Viana do Castelo–Ponte de Lima), in Minho region

As of 2013, 84% of Portuguese motorways have tolls, although there are also some toll-free highways, mostly in urban areas, like those of Greater Lisbon and Greater Porto. Tolls charge drivers by the distance they travel. Almost all motorways are managed by private concessionaries, such as Brisa and Ascendi. In the late 1990s and early 2000s, the Government of Portugal created seven shadow toll concessions, the SCUT toll (Portagens sem cobrança aos utilizadores, tolls with no charges for the users). In those concessions it was included more than 900 kilometres (560 mi) of motorways and highways, some of them already built, others which were built in the following years. However, due to economical and political reasons, the shadow toll concept was abolished between 2010 and 2011, with electronic toll equipment being installed in these motorways, to charge their users. Having only electronic tolls, former SCUT motorways can now only be used by vehicles equipped with electronic payment devices or vehicles registered in the system. In the 2000s (i.e. previous to the introduction of tolls in SCUT highways), 35% of the Portuguese motorway network was toll-free, and Portugal was already considered one of the European countries with more toll roads. Following the introduction of tolls in former SCUT highways, 84% of the network had tolls, i.e., only 16% was toll-free. In January 2025, 800km of former SCUT highways become toll-free again, following a motion put forward in Parliament in June 2024 by PS, supported by Chega and left-wing minority parties. The measure will bring costs to the public purse of around 200 million euros per year.

Since 1991 there is an electronic payment system for tolls in Portugal called Via Verde. Under this system, the driver installs a small device on the front windshield that communicates electronically with Brisa (the company responsible for managing most of the motorways in Portugal). Since the payment is electronic, it is quick to enter or leave the motorway, avoiding payment lines (which are still available for drivers without Via Verde). This system has won several prizes for its innovative form of paying for services.

=== Principal routes ===
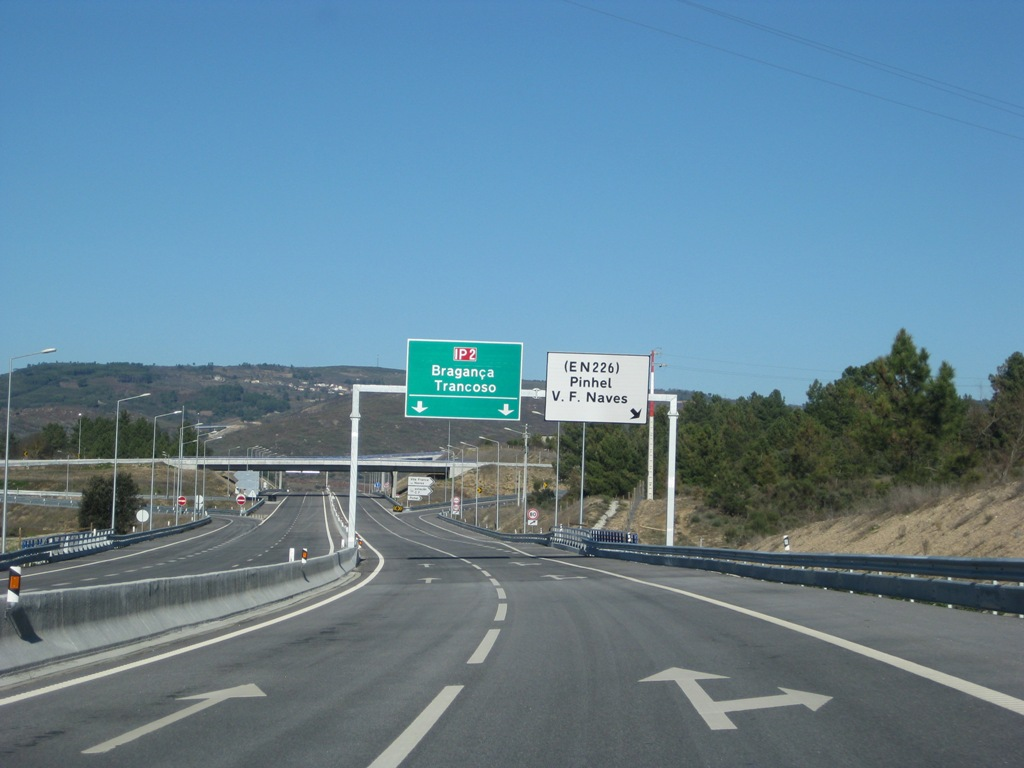
Vila Franca das Naves exit of IP2 non-motorway Celorico da Beira and Trancoso section

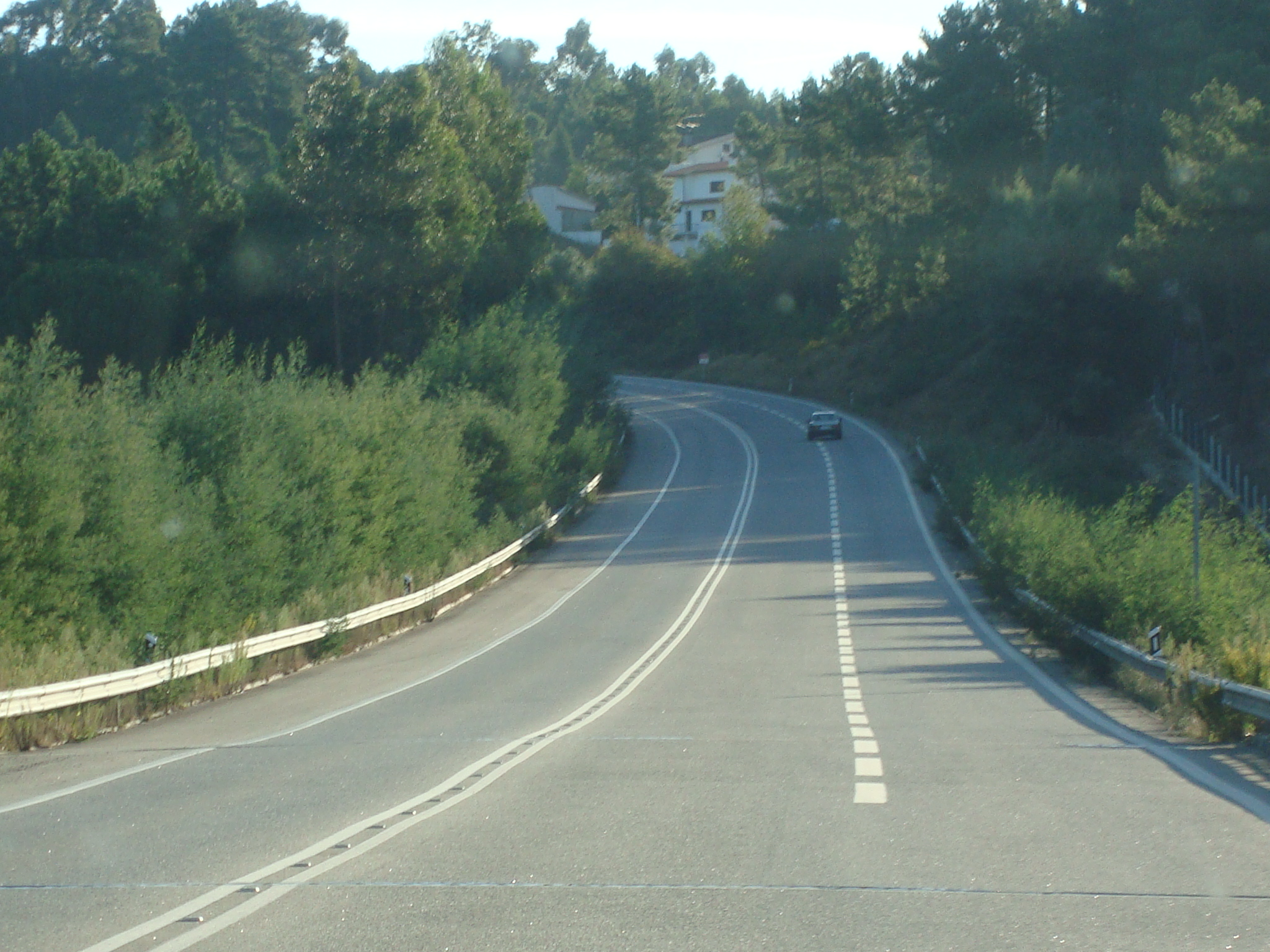
Non-motorway section of IP3, between Coimbra and Viseu

There are nine itinerários principais (principal routes), signalized by the prefix IP, designated IP1 through IP9.

IP1 and IP2 form cross-national north–south routes. The first runs along the west part of the country then ends in the southeast border of Castro Marim/Vila Real de Santo António; the second runs along the east part, roughly along the border with Spain.

All other routes follow a west–east course, with the exception of IP3 which runs mostly north–south.

All itinerários principais, except IP6 and IP9, are connected with the Spanish border. IP2 reaches Spain by route of N103-7, in the region of Trás-os-Montes e Alto Douro.

Number	Route	Length
IP 1	Valença – Braga – Porto – Aveiro – Coimbra – Leiria – Santarém – Lisbon – Montijo – Setúbal – Aljustrel – Faro – Castro Marim	734 km (456 mi)
IP 2	Portelo – Bragança – Guarda – Covilhã – Castelo Branco – Portalegre – Évora – Beja – Ourique – Faro	564 or 728 km (350 or 452 mi) (including N103-7 Portelo–Bragança and IP1/A2-IP1/IC4/A22-IC4/N-125-4 Castro Verde–Faro concurrencies)
IP 3	Vila Verde da Raia – Vila Real – Lamego – Viseu – Coimbra – Figueira da Foz	279 km (173 mi)
IP 4	Porto – Vila Real – Bragança – Quintanilha	237 km (147 mi)
IP 5	Aveiro – Viseu – Guarda – Vilar Formoso	204 km (127 mi)
IP 6	Peniche – Caldas da Rainha – Rio Maior – Santarém – Torres Novas – Abrantes – Castelo Branco	219 km (136 mi)
IP 7	Lisbon – Setúbal – Évora – Estremoz – Elvas – Caia	225 km (140 mi)
IP 8	Sines – Santiago do Cacém – Beja – Serpa – Vila Verde de Ficalho	154 km (96 mi)
IP 9	Viana do Castelo – Ponte de Lima – Braga – Guimarães – Amarante – Vila Real	161 km (100 mi)

=== Complementary routes ===
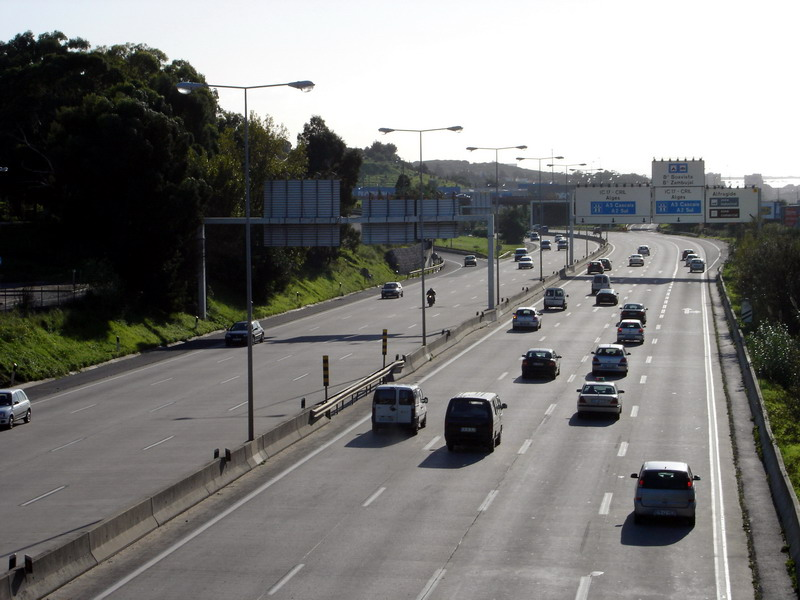
IC17 is a dual carriageway highway that encircles Lisbon. Legally, it is included in the motorway network of the 2000 National Road Plan, but the road is not signalized as such.

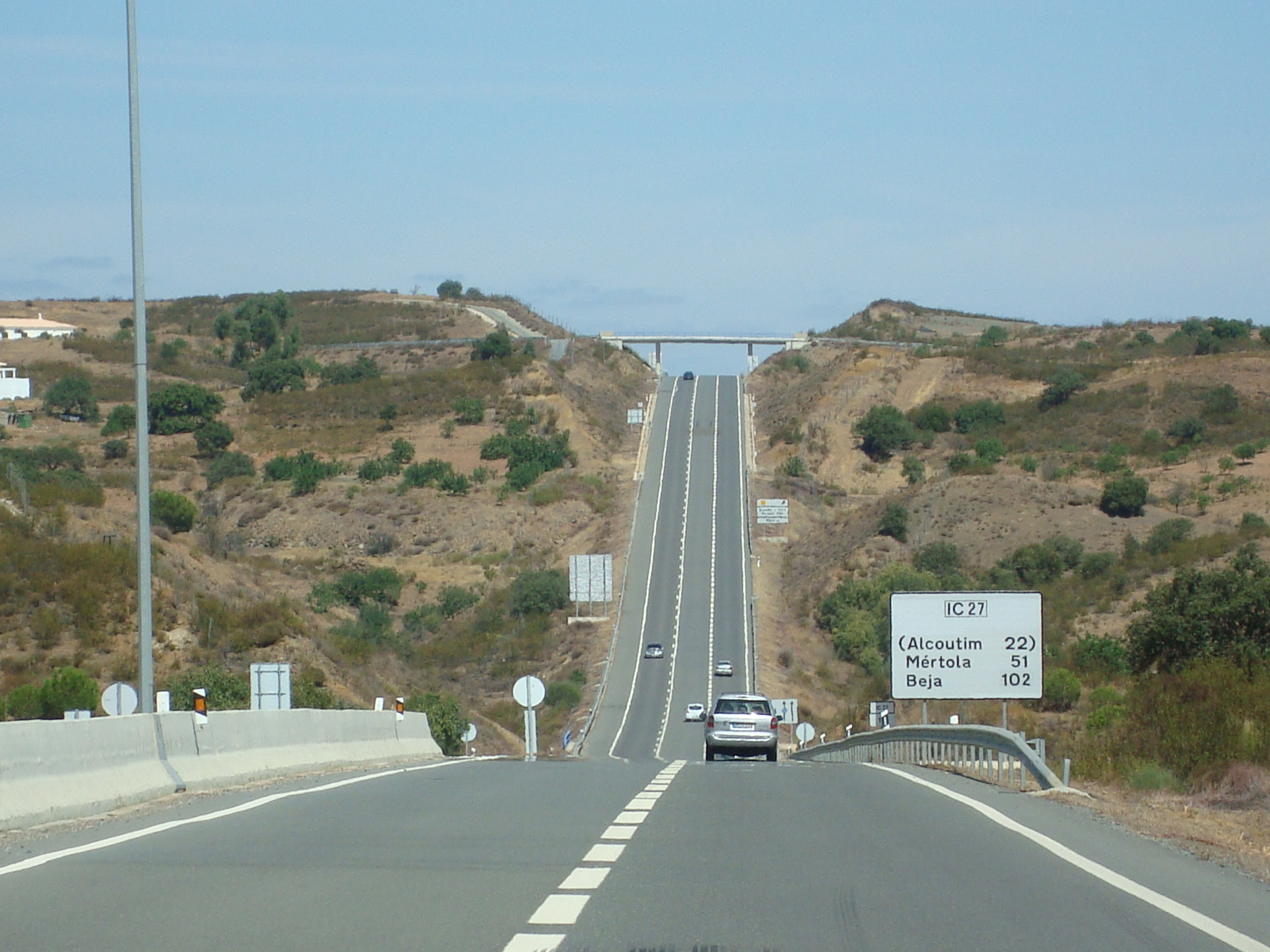
Typical signage of a non-motorway IC road, IC27 in the Algarve

There are 37 itinerários complementares (complementary routes), signalized by the letters IC, designated IC1 through IC37.

Number	Route	Length (km)
IC 1	Valença – Viana do Castelo – Póvoa de Varzim – Porto – Espinho – Ovar – Aveiro – Figueira da Foz – Leiria – Caldas da Rainha – Torres Vedras – Lisbon – Marateca – Alcácer do Sal – Grândola – Ourique – Guia (N125)	737
IC 2	Lisbon – Rio Maior – Leiria – Coimbra – Mealhada – São João da Madeira – Argoncilhe – Porto	330
IC 3	Setúbal – Palmela – Montijo -**- Canha – Salvaterra de Magos – Almeirim -**- Entroncamento – Tomar – Penela – Condeixa – Coimbra -**- (IP3)	177 / 235
IC 4	Sines -**- Lagos – Portimão – Faro	85 / ?
IC 5	Póvoa de Varzim (IC1) – Famalicão – Guimarães – Fafe – Vila Pouca de Aguiar – Murça – Vila Flor – Alfândega da Fé – Mogadouro – Miranda do Douro (border with Spain)	235
IC 6	Coimbra – IP3 – Porto da Raiva/Aguieira Dam – Venda de Galizes -**- Covilhã (IP2)	29 / 87 (excluding IP3 concurrency)
IC 7	Venda de Galizes (IC6) -**- Seia -**- Gouveia -**- Fornos de Algodres (IP5)	40
IC 8	Figueira da Foz (IC1) – Pombal – Figueiró dos Vinhos – Pedrógão Grande – Sertã – Proença-a-Nova – Castelo Branco – Segura (IP 2)	119
IC 9	Nazaré – Alcobaça – IC2 – Porto de Mós – Batalha – Fátima – Ourém – Tomar + Abrantes -**- Ponte de Sor (IC13)	70 / 104 (excluding IC2 concurrency)
IC 10	Santarém (IP1) – Almeirim -**- Coruche -**- Montemor-o-Novo (IP7)	11 / 90
IC 11	(Peniche – Lourinhã -) Torres Vedras (IC1) -**- Carregado – Pegões – Marateca (IP 1)	63 / 90
IC 12	Mira (IC1) – Anadia (IP 1) – Mortágua – Santa Comba Dão – Carregal do Sal – Nelas – Mangualde (IP5)	19 / 94
IC 13	Montijo (IP1) -**- Coruche -**- Mora -**- Ponte de Sor -**- Alter do Chão – Crato – Portalegre -**- Spain	28 / ?
IC 14	Apúlia (IC1) – Barcelos – Braga	29
IC 15	Lisbon – Oeiras – Cascais	25
IC 16	Lisbon (IC17) – Amadora – Belas – Alto Colaride – Sintra	20 (excluding IC18 concurrency)
IC 17	Algés – Buraca – Olival de Basto – Sacavém (IP1)	21
IC 18	Caxias (IC15) – Queluz – Loures – Alverca (IP 1)	35
IC 19	Lisbon (IC17) – Queluz – Sintra (N249)	16
IC 20	Almada – Costa da Caparica	6
IC 21	Coina – Barreiro	7
IC 22	Olival Basto (IC17) – Montemor (IC18)	4
IC 23	Ponte da Arrábida – Avenida de Fernão de Magalhães – Ponte de Freixo – Avenida da República – IC1	21
IC 24	Perafita – Maia – Aguiar de Sousa – Argoncilhe – Espinho	62
IC 25	Ermida (IC24) – Paços de Ferreira – Lousada	20
IC 26	Amarante (IP 4) -**- Régua – (IP3/A24) – Lamego -**- Tarouca -**- Moimenta da Beira -**- Sernancelhe -**- Trancoso (IP2)	?
IC 27	Beja (IP2) -**- Mértola – Castro Marim (IP1)	33 / 93
IC 28	Viana do Castelo (IC1) – Ponte de Lima - Lindoso	38 / 69
IC 29	Porto – Gondomar – Aguiar de Sousa (IC24)	16
IC 30	Sintra (IC16) – Alcabideche (IC15)	8
IC 31	Castelo Branco (IP2) -**- Termas de Monfortinho	56
IC 32	Funchalinho – Coina – Montijo	40
IC 33	Sines – Grândola – IP1/A2 – IP8/A26 -**- Santa Margarida do Sado -**- Évora (IP 7)	38 / 106
~~IC 34~~	Vila Nova de Foz Côa (IP2) – Almendra – Barca de Alva (border with Spain)	Project cancelled in 2009
IC 35	Penafiel -**- Entre-Os-Rios Bridge -**- Castelo de Paiva – Arouca (-**- Vale de Cambra -**-) Sever do Vouga -**- Talhadas (IP5/A25)	4 / 70
IC 36	Marinha Grande (IC1) – Leiria (IP1)	11
IC 37	Viseu (IP5) -**- Nelas -**- Seia (IC7)	31

Note: Italics and -**- refers to unbuilt sections.

=== National routes ===
Estradas Nacionais (national routes) belong to the Complementary Network. They have three main functions: connect cities not linked by an IP or IC highway, connect municipal seats, borders, ports and airports to the rest of the state-owned network and provide free alternatives to toll motorways. Examples for each of these functions can be made: N103 links Braga, Chaves and Bragança, N256 and N256-1 link the border of São Leonardo and the municipal seats of Mourão and Reguengos de Monsaraz to IP2 expressway and N4 provides a free alternative to A6 toll motorway. National roads kept the same numbering they had in the 1945 Plan, with the prefix N, and are administered by the agency Estradas de Portugal. In the 1985 Plan, these were generically referred as "other roads".

Many of the 1945 Plan's estradas nacionais were not included in the post-1985 highway plans and were declassified from the National Road Network in anticipation of their transfer to municipal authorities. Although some were transferred, many municipalities did not assume responsibility for the management of these roads; a number of them continue to be administered by the national roads agency. Despite being declassified, most of the roads retained their designations, keeping their old numberings and N prefixes, including those that are administered by the municipalities.

=== Regional roads ===
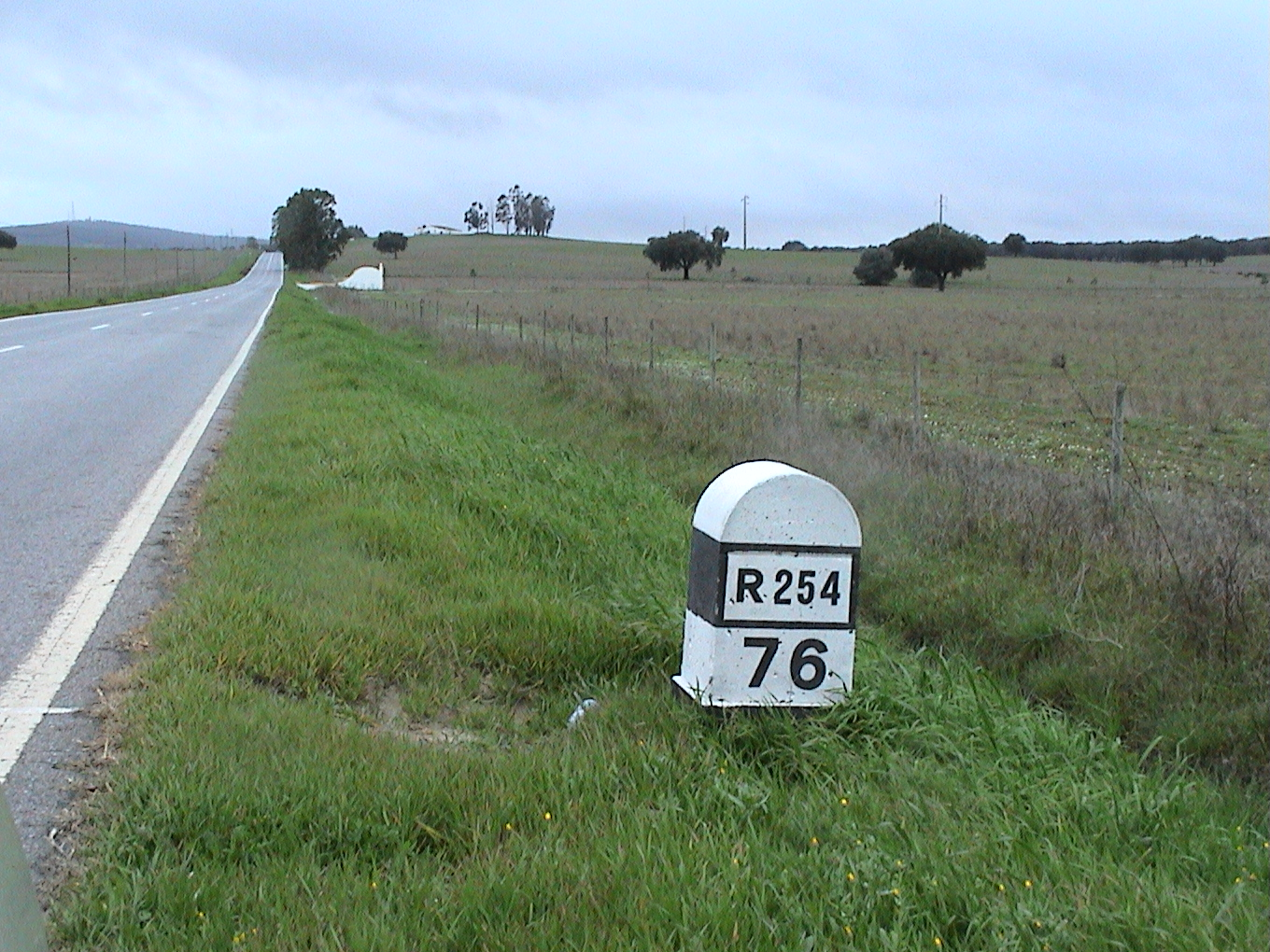
Signage in R254 (Évora-Viana do Alentejo)

Estradas regionais (regional roads) integrate the Regional Network. This road class was created in 1998, with the approval of the 2000 National Roadway Plan. According to Law No. 222/98 "the public road communications with supra-municipal interest, and complementary to the National Road Network, are carried by Regional Roads".

Each regional road maintains the number of the national road or municipal road that originated it. Regional roads are represented by the letter R. Because, in 1998, it was rejected in a referendum, a reform which consisted of the creation of eight administrative regions in mainland Portugal, nowadays, some regional roads are administered by Estradas de Portugal, while others are administered by Portuguese municipalities.

=== Municipal roads ===
Estradas municipais (municipal roads) are represented by the letter M and are administered by Portuguese municipalities. These routes were created in 1961, since which time many branches of national routes had been municipalized. Some municipal routes created by the 1985 Plan were renamed as "national roads" or "regional roads" in the 2000 Plan.

== European routes ==
Portugal is crossed by eight European routes:

Number	Route
E 1	Larne – Belfast – Newry – Dundalk – Drogheda – Dublin – Rosslare ... A Coruña – Pontevedra – Valença – Porto – Lisbon – Albufeira – Vila Real de Santo António – Huelva – Seville
E 80	Lisbon – Aveiro – Vilar Formoso – Valladolid – Burgos – San Sebastián – Toulouse – Nice – Genoa – Rome – Pescara ... Dubrovnik – Podgorica – Pristina – Niš – Sofia – Plovdiv – Istanbul – İzmit – Gerede – Amasya – Erzurum – Gürbulak – border with Iran
E 82	Porto – Vila Real – Bragança – Zamora – Tordesillas
E 90	Lisbon – Évora – Elvas – Madrid – Barcelona ... Mazara del Vallo – Palermo – Messina ... Reggio Calabria – Metaponto – Taranto – Brindisi ... Igoumenitsa – Ioannina – Kozani – Thessaloniki – Alexandroupoli – Gelibolu ... Lapseki – Bursa – Ankara – Adana – Nusaybin – Khabur River – border with Iraq
E 801	Verín – Chaves – Vila Real – Lamego – Viseu – Coimbra
E 802	Bragança – Guarda – Castelo Branco – Portalegre – Évora – Beja – Ourique
E 805	Famalicão – Guimarães – Vila Pouca de Aguiar – Chaves
E 806	Torres Novas – Abrantes – Castelo Branco – Guarda

== See also ==
- Estradas de Portugal (agency responsible for administering roads)
- Transport in Portugal
