= A5 motorway (Portugal) =

Road in Greater Lisbon, Portugal

Auto-estrada da Costa do Estoril

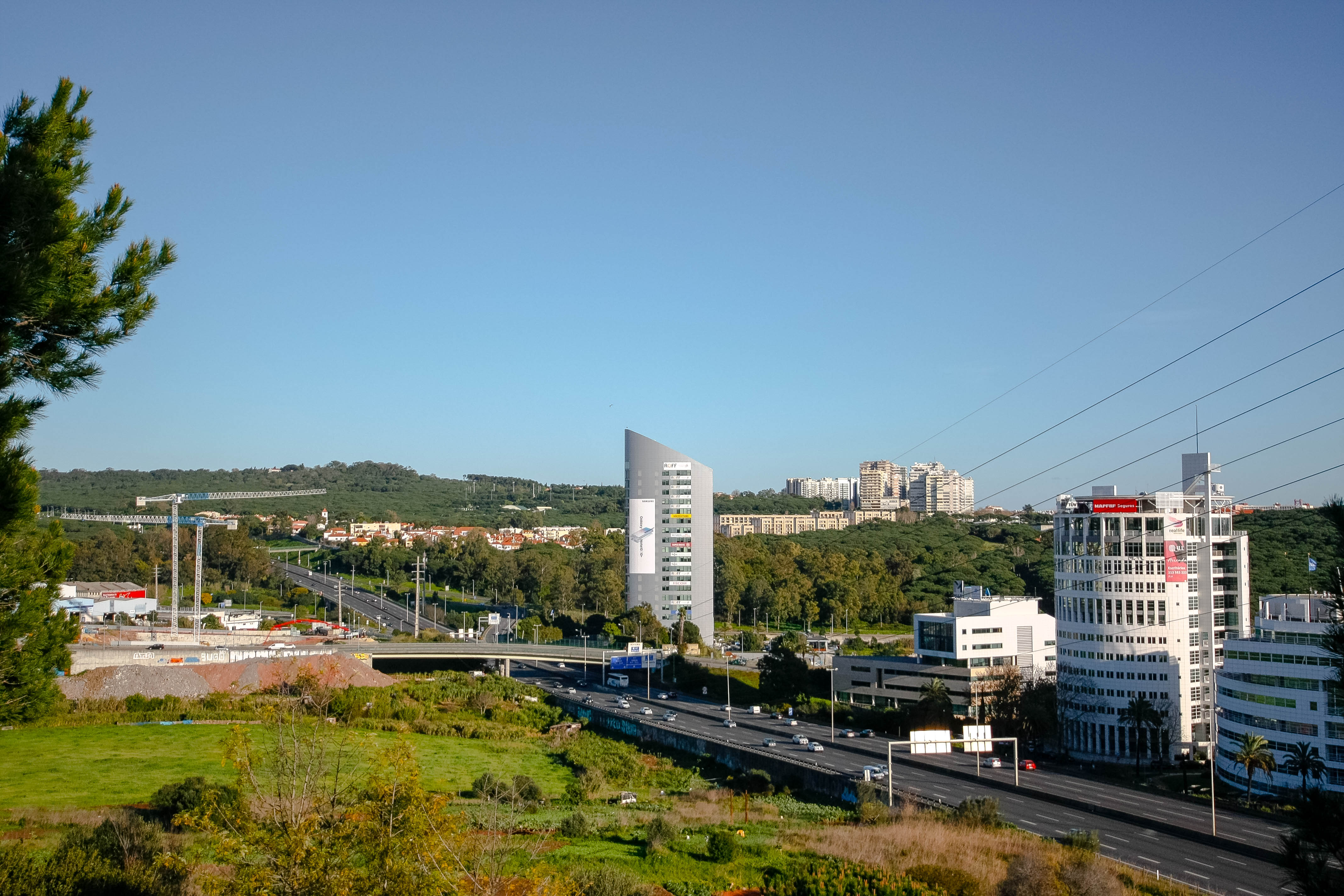
- The A5 in Miraflores, Oeiras going past the suburban business parks toward the Monsanto Forest Park

Route information
- Maintained by Brisa
- Length: 25 km (16 mi)
- Existed: 1944–present

Major junctions
- East end: Lisbon (Viaduto Duarte Pacheco)
- - Monsanto, Lisbon; - CRIL - Miraflores; - CREL - Estádio Nacional, Jamor; - Alcabideche
- West end: Aldeia de Juso, Cascais

Location
- Country: Portugal
- Municipalities: Lisbon, Oeiras, Cascais

Highway system
- Roads in Portugal

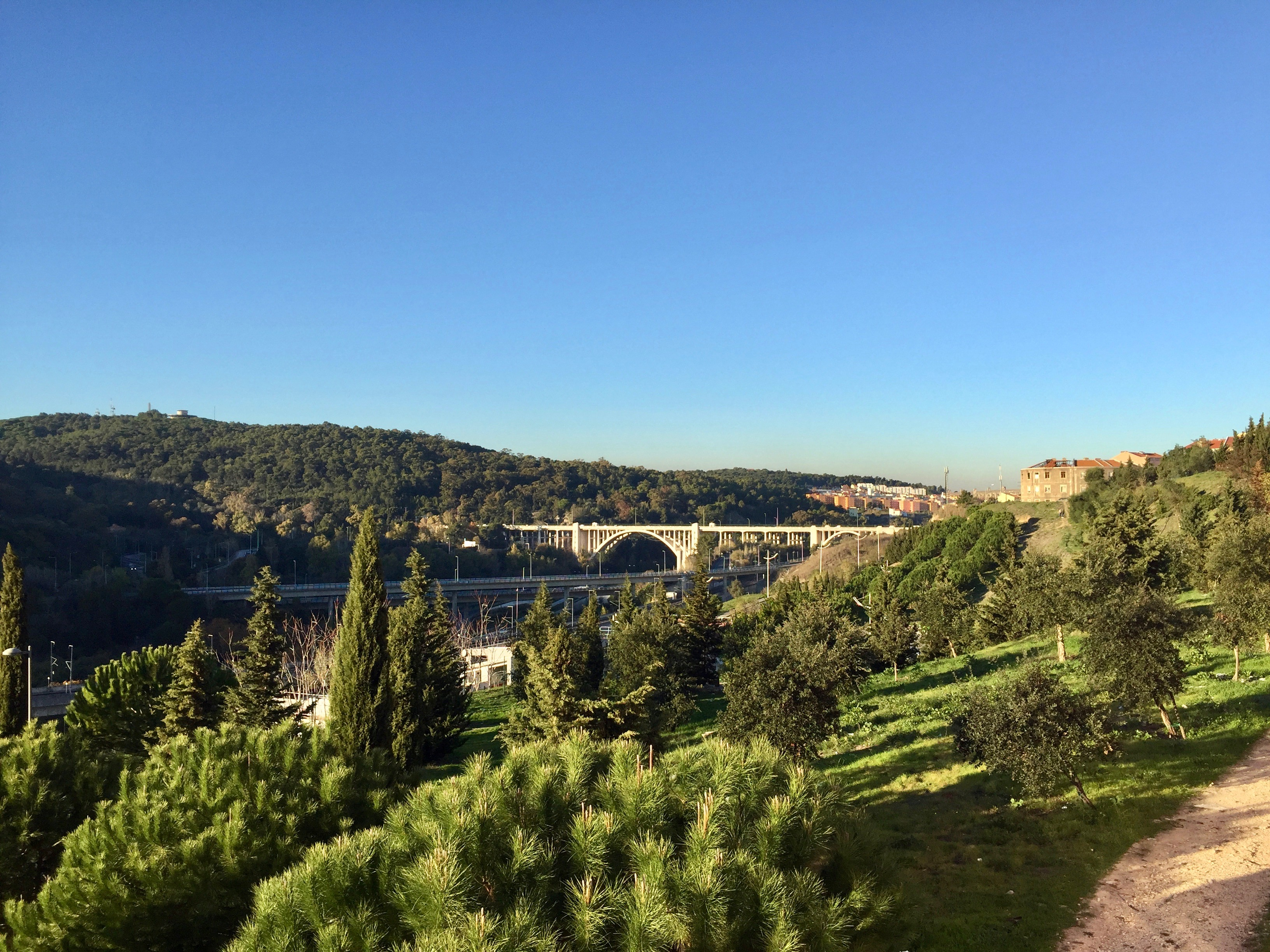
The Duarte Pacheco Viaduct over the Alcântara Valley

The memorial statue of Duarte Pacheco at the end of the Viaduct in Monsanto, where the A5 begins

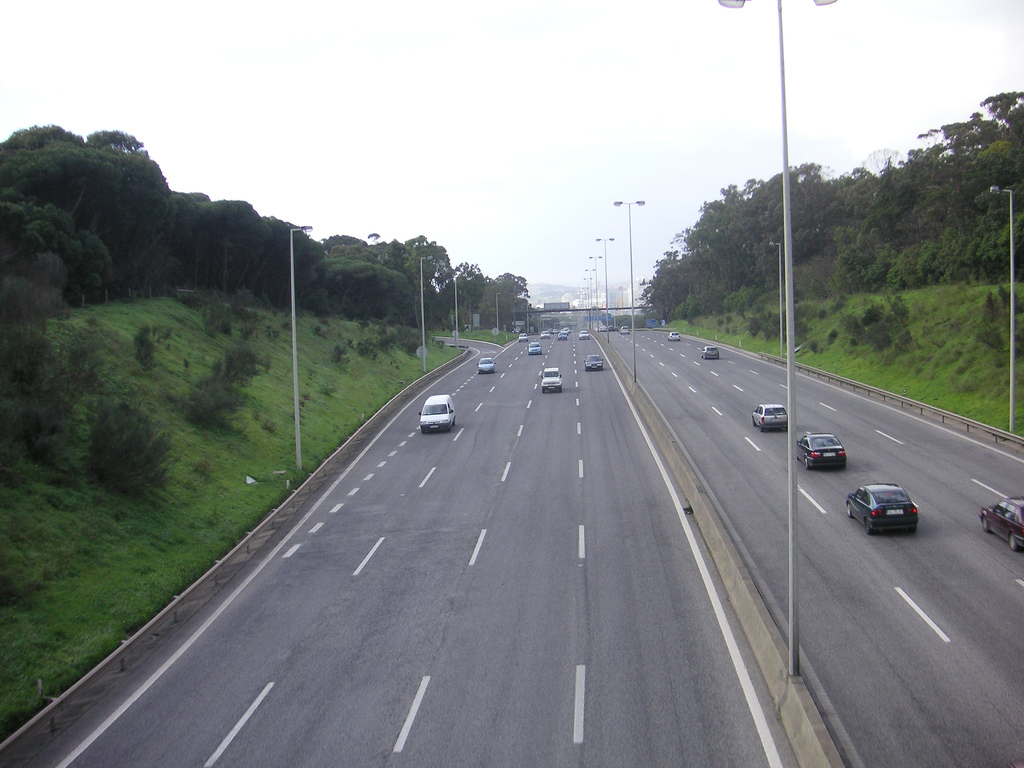
The A5 crossing the Monsanto

The A5 near Amoreira, Estoril

The A5 (Auto-estrada 5) or Auto-estrada da Costa do Estoril (English: Estoril Coast Motorway) is a 25-kilometre-long (16 mi) partially tolled Portuguese motorway, located in the Lisbon metropolitan area. Also marked as the IC15 (Itinerário Complementar 15), it connects the national capital Lisbon with Cascais, serving several of the city's suburbs.

The first section of the highway – connecting the Duarte Pacheco Viaduct in the City of Lisbon with the National Stadium in the Oeiras Municipality – was opened in 1944, becoming the first motorway in Portugal and one of the first in the world. From 1945 to the early 1980s, it was officially designated National Road 7 (EN7), until it officially became the A5. The last section of the A5 was opened in 2016.

== Route ==
Route of the A5/IC15 road
Km	Exit number	Destinations	Exit road	Notes
-		(Lisbon): M. Pombal, Saldanha	(Avenida Eng.º Duarte Pacheco/ Túnel do Marquês de Pombal)	Extremity of the road's carriageway profile. Not officially part of the A5.
-		Amoreiras, Campolide	(Avenida Eng.º Duarte Pacheco/ Túnel do Marquês de Pombal)	Extremity of the road's carriageway profile. Not officially part of the A5.
-		Campo de Ourique, Estrela, Rato	(Avenida Eng.º Duarte Pacheco/ Túnel do Marquês de Pombal)	Extremity of the road's carriageway profile. Not officially part of the A5.
-	Lisbon - Duarte Pacheco petrol stations			A5 approach
-		Setúbal, Almada; PONTE - SUL	IP7-Eixo Norte-Sul/Avenida da Ponte	A5 approach, not officially part of the motorway. Westbound Ponte 25 de Abril/A2 access.
0	Duarte Pacheco Viaduct			IC15 nomenclature only
1	1	Marquês (de) Pombal	(Avenida Eng.º Duarte Pacheco)	Eastbound signage
1	1	Praça de Espanha; A2 SUL; Avenida de Ceuta	IP7-Eixo Norte-Sul via Estrada da Pimenteira	A2 access on eastbound exit only, Av. Ceuta on westbound signage only
2	2	Ajuda; Monsanto	Cruz das Oliveiras roundabouts	
3	3	IC19 Sintra, EN117 Amadora	EN117 (Estrada Cabos d'Ávila)	Westbound only
3	3	Algés, Belém	EN117 (Estrada Cabos d'Ávila)	
3	4	IC17 CRIL; A1 NORTE; Parede, Carcavelos aeroporto	IC17-CRIL	Eastbound only
5	5	Carnaxide, Linda-a-Velha	Av. do Forte/ Av. 25 de Abril de 1974	
8	6	Queijas estádio Cruz Quebrada	Estrada Militar/ Av. Pierre de Coubertin	Caxias signage and exit westbound only, Cruz Quebrada eastbound only. Eastern access for Jamor complex and parking.
8	6	Caxias, Avenida Marginal/ A9 CREL Loures; A1 - A8 - A10	EN6-3/ A9	Duplicate exit number. Western access for Estádio Nacional entries and parking.
9	Ribeira de Barcarena			
10	Oeiras service area			
11	7	Cacém, Porto Salvo; TagusPark	EN249-3	Westbound only. TagusPark signage on toll approach
11	7	Praça de Portagem de Porto Salvo (toll)		7 Cacém/Porto Salvo westbound exit only
11	7	Oeiras, Paço de Arcos	EN249-3	Duplicate exit number
12	Ribeira da Laje			
15	Praça de Portagem de Carcavelos (toll)			
15	8	EN249-4 Parede, Carcavelos; Tires	EN249-4	
17	Ribeira de Caparide			
19	9	EN6-8 Estoril, Alcoitão; Bicesse, Manique	EN6-8/ Av. Condes de Barcelona	Exit for the ESHTE and the Estoril Tennis Club
22	10	A16; Sintra; Alcabideche hospital autódromo A9 NORTE	A16	Circuito do Estoril, despite access on both sides, and A9 mentioned only on eastbound road
23	10	Cascais; Amoreira, Abuxarda	EN9	Westbound exit, eastbound entrance only. Other directions must use junction 2 of the A16 to reverse course.
23	11	Alvide, Cobre	EN9	Westbound exit, eastbound entrance only
24	Ribeira das Vinhas Viaduct			
25	12	EN9-1 Malveira; Cabo da Roca; Praia do Guincho	EN9-1	No westbound entry
25	12	EN9-1 Cascais; Birre, Aldeia de Juso	Rotunda Delfim Santos	end of motorway
