= A6 motorway (Portugal) =

Road in Portugal

A6
- Portuguese: Auto-Estrada do Alentejo Central (previously planned as the Auto-estrada do Alentejo)

Route information
- Part of E90 E802
- Length: 159 km (99 mi)

Major junctions
- West end: Marateca, (for Lisbon)
- East end: the Spanish frontier crossing

Location
- Country: Portugal

Highway system
- Roads in Portugal

The A 6 is a Portuguese motorway which runs east from Marateca (a short distance from Lisbon) to the Portugal–Spain border, near Elvas, where it connects to the Autovía A-5 in Spain.

Since 1999, the highway has formed part of the principal road linking Lisbon with Madrid.

At its western end the road connects with the A2 approximately 50 km (30 miles) south-east of Lisbon, but while the A2 swings to the south the A6 continues east passing through the Alto Alentejo via Montemor-o-Novo, Évora and the Estremoz marble quarries. It then continues past Borba and Elvas, the Portuguese part of the road terminating at the crossing of the Caia River which here forms the frontier with Spain.

Apart from the most easterly section approaching the frontier, the road is the responsibility of Brisa, the Portuguese highway operator. The toll for a Class 1 vehicle (normal motor car) travelling the full distance from Marateca to Elvas is €11.95 (2010).

The road carries very little traffic.

A6	AADT 2011	AADT 2012	% Change 2011	% Change 2012
A2/A6/A13-Vendas Novas	7,988	6,653	-16.5%	-16.7%
Évora Poente-Évora Nascente	2,768	2,312	-16.3%	-16.5%
Overall AADT	4,700	3,910	-16.6%	-16.8%
