= Estradas de Portugal =

In November 2007, EP Estradas de Portugal SA became the successor to EP - Estradas de Portugal, E.P.E. (a.k.a. Estradas de Portugal or EP) which had been the agency responsible for administering the roads in Portugal since 2004. EP Estradas de Portugal SA is a company which is 100% owned by the Government of Portugal has a 75-year concession to develop, plan and maintain the road network of Portugal, with the exception of most of the county's motorways, which are run by BRISA SA.

== Predecessors ==
EP is the successor to the Junta Autónoma das Estradas (JAE), which existed from 1927 until 1999, when JAE was replaced by three agencies: Instituto das Estradas de Portugal (IEP), Instituto para a Construção Rodoviária (ICOR), Instituto para a Conservação e Exploração da Rede Rodoviária (ICERR). In 2002, ICOR and ICERR were merged into a single agency - IEP. In 2004, IEP is replaced by EP - Estradas de Portugal E.P.E.

== Plano Rodoviário Nacional ==
See Roads in Portugal.
