= A13-1 motorway (Portugal) =

Motorway in Portugal

A13-1

Route information
- Length: 9.4 km (5.8 mi)

Major junctions
- West end: A 1
- East end: A 13

Location
- Country: Portugal

Highway system
- Roads in Portugal

The A 13-1 is a motorway that connects the A 1 and the A 13 for a total of 9.4 km (5.8 mi). It has a west–east orientation and also serves as a link from IC 2 to A 1.

This has been open to traffic since December 2012. It belongs to the Pinhal Interior Subconcession owned by Ascendi, being carried by means of electronic toll. Unlike the A 13, which is also part of the Pinhal Interior Subconcession, there is no exemption for local traffic on this motorway.

The road carries very little traffic.
