= A14 motorway (Portugal) =

Road in Portugal

A14
- Autoestrada do Baixo Mondego

Route information
- Length: 40 km (25 mi)

Major junctions
- West end: Figueira da Foz
- East end: Coimbra (north)

Location
- Country: Portugal

Highway system
- Roads in Portugal

The A14, also called Autoestrada do Baixo Mondego, is a motorway in Portugal that connects Coimbra with Figueira da Foz, both belonging to the Região de Coimbra, in the Central Region, with a total length of 40 km (25 mi).

In Coimbra, the motorway starts in the north of the city, having a junction with the A1, which heads south towards Lisbon and north towards Porto, and with the IP3, which heads east towards Viseu. Arriving before the city of Figueira da Foz, the motorway has a junction with the A13, which heads south to Leiria and north to Aveiro.

The motorway was inaugurated in 1994 between Figueira da Foz and Montemor-o-Velho, with a length of 12 km (7.5 mi), continuing to Ançã in 2001, with another 13.4 km (8.3 mi), reaching the junction with the A1, in the north of Coimbra in 2002, growing by another 5.5 km (3.4 mi) in length, with a profile of two traffic lanes in each direction throughout its route.

Brisa has been the concessionaire since the beginning of the highway's entry into service. The motorway has a conventional toll system between Coimbra and Montemor-o-Velho, until Figueira da Foz is free. Current toll prices for the entire motorway journey are €2.50 for class C1, €4.50 for class C2, €5.75 for class C3 and €6.40 for class C4.

== Section ==
Section	Entrered service	Status	Km
Figueira da Foz–Montemor-o-Velho	1994	In service	12
Montemor-o-Velho–Ançã	2001	In service	13.4
Ançã–Coimbra A 1	2002	In service	5.5

== Capacity ==
Section	Profile	Km
Figueira da Foz–Montemor-o-Velho		12
Montemor-o-Velho–Ançã		13.4
Ançã–Coimbra A 1		5.5

== Traffic ==
Between Figueira da Foz and the junction with the A17, traffic on the motorway is the highest, exceeding 20,000 vehicles per day. Traffic decreases toward Ançã, where volumes do not exceed 7,000 vehicles per day. Approaching Coimbra, traffic levels rise again at the junction with the A1, surpassing 10,000 vehicles per day, and increase to approximately 20,000 vehicles per day near the Coimbra North tolls.
