= Speed limits in Portugal =

Border sign displaying the general speed limits for cars and motorcycles

Speed limits in Portugal depend on both the type of road and vehicle:

	Built-up areas	Motorways	Expressways	Other roads
Cars and motorcycles	50	120	100	90
Commercial vehicles	50	110	90	80
Buses	50	100	90	80
Trucks	50	90	80	80

When using a trailer the limits are as follows:

	Built-up areas	Motorways	Expressways	Other roads
Cars and motorcycles	50	100	80	70
Commercial vehicles	50	90	80	70
Buses	50	90	90	70
Trucks	40	80	70	70

== See also ==
- List of highways in Portugal
