= A25 motorway (Portugal) =

Road in Portugal

A25
- Portuguese: Autoestrada das Beiras Litoral e Alta

Route information
- Part of E80 E802
- Length: 199 km (124 mi)

Major junctions
- West end: Aveiro
- East end: Vilar Formoso

Location
- Country: Portugal

Highway system
- Roads in Portugal

The A25 (Portuguese: Autoestrada das Beiras Litoral e Alta) is a major motorway (freeway) in Portugal. It connects Aveiro, in the west coast, to Vilar Formoso, where the motorway crosses the border and continues as A-62 Motorway in Spain. Serving important cities in the interior like Viseu and Guarda, A25 is operated by Ascendi Costa de Prata, Auto Estradas da Costa de Prata, S. A.
