= Brisa – Auto-estradas de Portugal =

Brisa - Auto-estradas de Portugal, S.A.
- Type: Public subsidiary (Sociedade Anónima)
- Traded as: Euronext Lisbon: BRI
- Industry: Transportation, construction
- Founded: 1972
- Founder: Jorge de Brito
- Headquarters: São Domingos de Rana, Portugal
- Key people: Vasco de Mello (Chairman); António Pires de Lima (CEO)
- Services: Operation and maintenance of highways and toll roads, electronic toll collection, railway and airport operating concessions
- Revenue: €764.8 million (2010)
- Operating income: €673.7 million (2010)
- Net income: €778.5 million (2010)
- Total assets: €6.086 billion (end 2010)
- Total equity: €1.893 billion (end 2010)
- Number of employees: 2,670 (end 2010)
- Parent: Grupo José de Mello (57.3%)
- Website: https://www.brisa.pt/en/

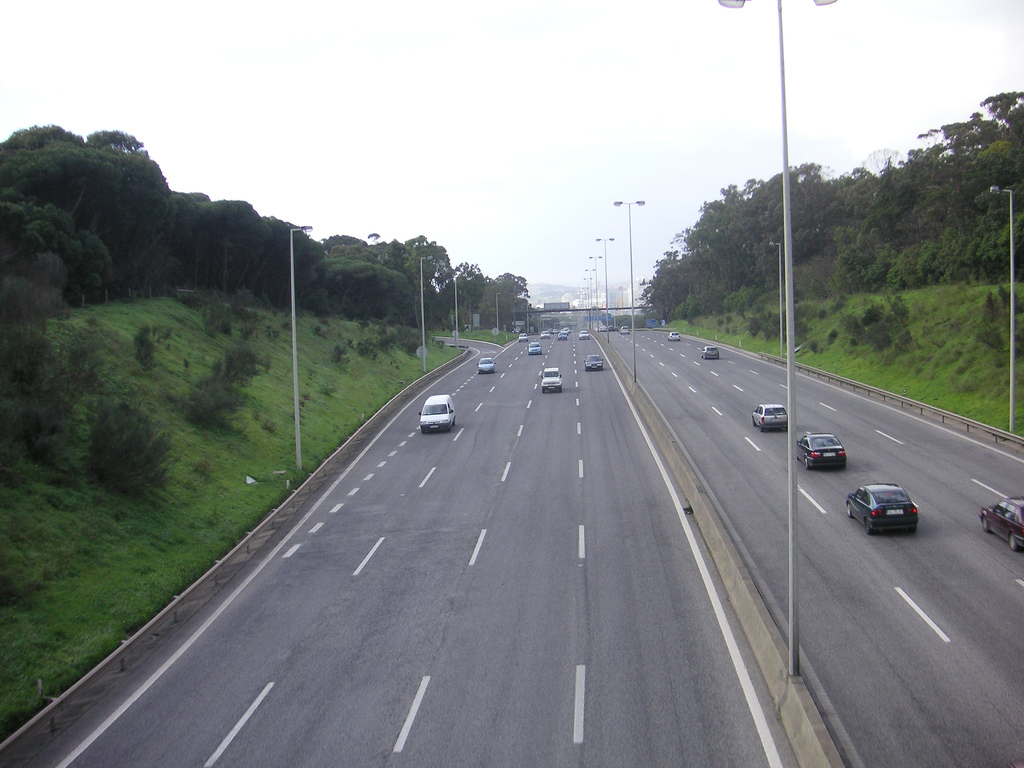
Portugal's A5 motorway, operated by Brisa

Brisa – Auto-estradas de Portugal, S.A. is a Portugal-based international transportation company. The group's largest business area is highway management, in which it is the largest concessionaire in its home country. Founded in 1972 by Jorge de Brito, Brisa also has operations in countries including the United States and the Netherlands. Since 2000 Brisa's largest shareholder has been the investment company and family office Grupo José de Mello, which owns over 30% of its stock through subsidiaries. The Spanish infrastructure company Abertis holds around 15% of the firm. The company is listed on the Lisbon Stock Exchange and is a constituent of the benchmark PSI-20 and Euronext 100 indices. Its current CEO is António Pires de Lima.

== Operations ==
=== Portugal ===
In Portugal Brisa exclusively operates the following motorways with a concession lasting until 2035:

- A1 - Auto-estrada do Norte
- A2 - Auto-estrada do Sul
- A3 - Auto-estrada Porto/Valença
- A4 - Auto-estrada Matosinhos/Amarante
- A5 - Auto-estrada da Costa do Estoril
- A6 - Auto-estrada Marateca/Caia
- A9 - CREL - Circular Regional Exterior de Lisboa
- A10 - Auto-estrada Bucelas/Carregado/IC3
- A12 - Auto-estrada Setúbal/Montijo
- A13 - Auto-estrada Almeirim/Marateca
- A14 - Auto-estrada Figueira da Foz/Coimbra Norte

Brisa owns 50% of Auto-Estradas do Atlântico, operator of the A8 and A15 motorways until 2028; 70% of the Brisal concession, which is licensed to run the A17 road until 2034; and with a 45% stake heads the Douro Litoral consortium which will operate the A32, A41 and A43 motorways until 2034.

Two further tenders were awarded to consortia including Brisa in 2009. The firm leads the Auto-estradas do Baixo Tejo concession with a 30% stake, which includes construction, widening, operation and maintenance of motorways and Itinerários Complementares trunk roads in the Setúbal area. Brisa also holds 15% of the Litoral Oeste concession, which covers 112 km of new and existing road around Leiria. Both contracts were awarded through to 2038.

Other major investments held by the company within Portugal include 60% of the Via Verde electronic toll collection system, also used in car parks and for other purposes; 100% of roadside assistance firm Brisa Assistência Rodoviária; and 60% of Controlauto, a chain of outlets offering vehicle inspection services.

The company has signalled its intent to diversify into other modes of transportation. In December 2009 a Brisa-led consortium was awarded a contract to construct the first stage of a high-speed rail link between Lisbon and Madrid by the Portuguese government, giving it a 40-year concession to operate the line within Portugal. Brisa, along with Mota-Engil, also heads the Asterion consortium which intends to bid for control of the Portuguese airport authority ANA should it be privatised by the government; and with it the right to construct and operate the proposed replacement for Lisbon's international airport in Alcochete.

=== International ===
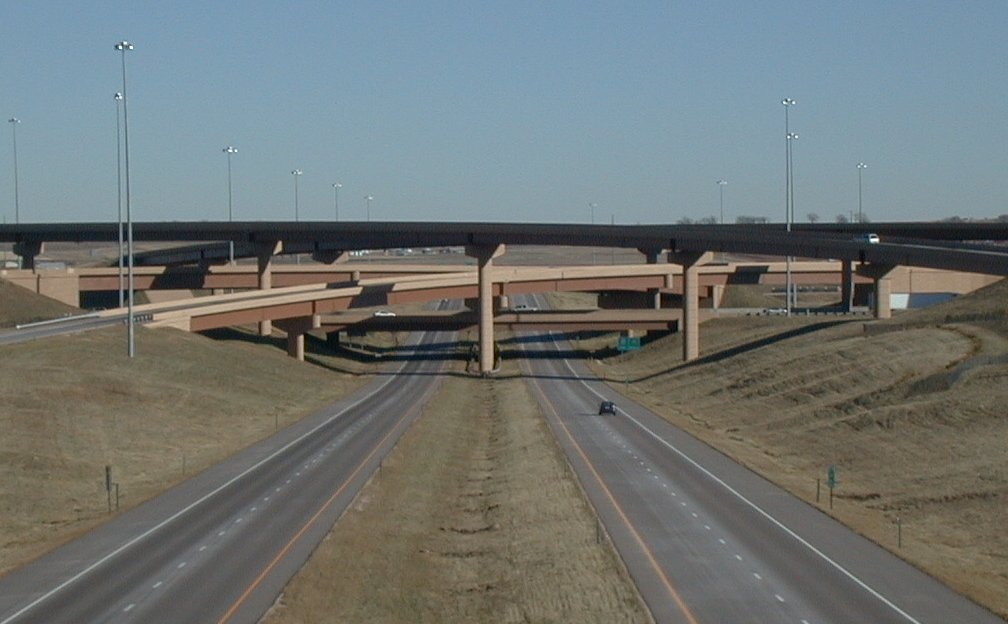
Brisa has led the operation of Colorado's Northwest Parkway since 2007

In the United States, Brisa held 100% of the operation of the Northwest Parkway toll road near Denver, Colorado from 2007 to 2024. In 2007 the firm purchased 30% of Movenience, the electronic toll collection system used in the Western Scheldt Tunnel in the Dutch province of Zeeland; this stake was increased to 40% in 2010.

Brisa's 16.3% holding in Brazilian peer Companhia de Concessões Rodoviárias (CCR) was sold in June 2010.

== See also ==
- Transport in Portugal
