= A3 motorway (Portugal) =

Road in Portugal

A3
- Portuguese: Auto-estrada do Minho; English: Minho Motorway

Route information
- Length: 112 km (70 mi)

Major junctions
- North end: Valença
- South end: Porto

Location
- Country: Portugal

Highway system
- Roads in Portugal

A3 is a motorway in northern Portugal, connecting Valença and Porto via Braga to the Portugal–Spain border, on the Minho River at Tui, where it connects to the Autovía A-55 in Galicia (Spain).

The A3 is operated by Brisa - Auto-estradas de Portugal. It has a total length of 112 km and coincides with the European itinerary number 1.

This motorway leaves the urban IC23 circular motorway around Porto and Gaia. This motorway passes through Maia, Braga and to the border town Valença. The motorway is a toll road, and most of the route north is climbing steadily until reaching Spain. The motorway is linked by a bridge on the border and another motorway to link with Vigo and Pontevedra which is in Galicia. It is under the care of Brisa S.A

Sections of the road carry very little traffic.
