= Apúlia =

Town in Portugal

Coordinates: 41°29′N 8°46′W

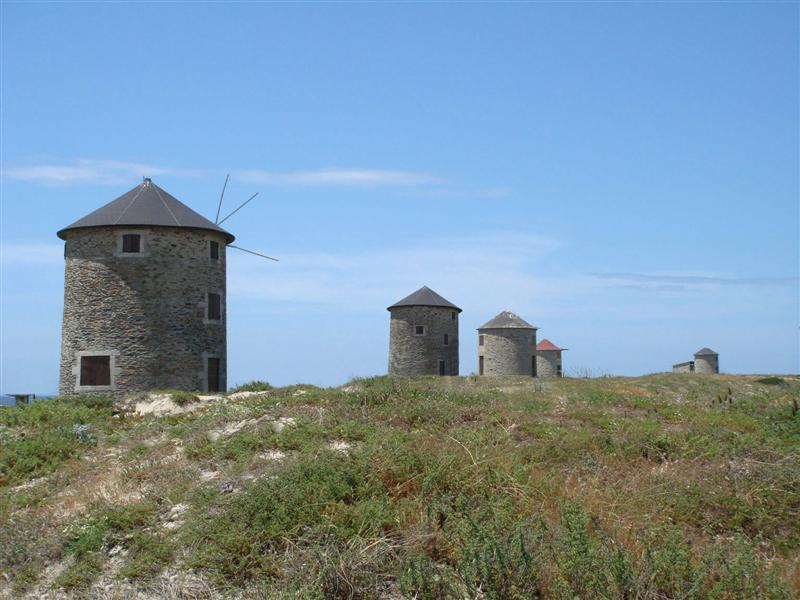
Mills of Apúlia.

Apúlia is a town and a former civil parish in the municipality of Esposende, Portugal. In 2013, the parish merged into the new parish Apúlia e Fão. It has a population of 4,323 inhabitants and a total area of 10.51 km^{2}, population density 411.3.

It was a town and a municipality until 1834, when it was incorporated into Esposende. Apúlia is known for its dune beaches and Roman-style folk costumes. It may be related to the region of Apulia in Italy, and a possible migration from there during the Roman Empire.
