= Cacém =

Cacém may refer to:

- Agualva-Cacém, a city in the municipality of Sintra, Portugal.
- Cacém (Sintra), a parish in the municipality of Sintra, Portugal.
- Santiago do Cacém, a municipality the district of Setúbal, Portugal.
