= A23 motorway (Portugal) =

Road in Portugal

A23
- Portuguese: Auto-Estrada da Beira Interior

Route information
- Length: 217 km (135 mi)

Major junctions
- South end: Torres Novas
- North end: Guarda

Location
- Country: Portugal

Highway system
- Roads in Portugal

The A23 (Portuguese: Auto-Estrada da Beira Interior) is a motorway (freeway) in Portugal. It connects Guarda, at the A25 motorway (near the Spanish border), to Torres Novas at the A1, the main motorway of Portugal.

Construction on A23 was completed in 2003. The road as of 2026 has no tolls.
