= A4 motorway (Portugal) =

Road in Portugal

A4
- Portuguese: Auto-estrada de Trás-os-Montes e Alto Douro

Route information
- Length: 223 km (139 mi)

Major junctions
- West end: Matosinhos (Porto)
- East end: Quintanilha (Bragança)

Location
- Country: Portugal

Highway system
- Roads in Portugal

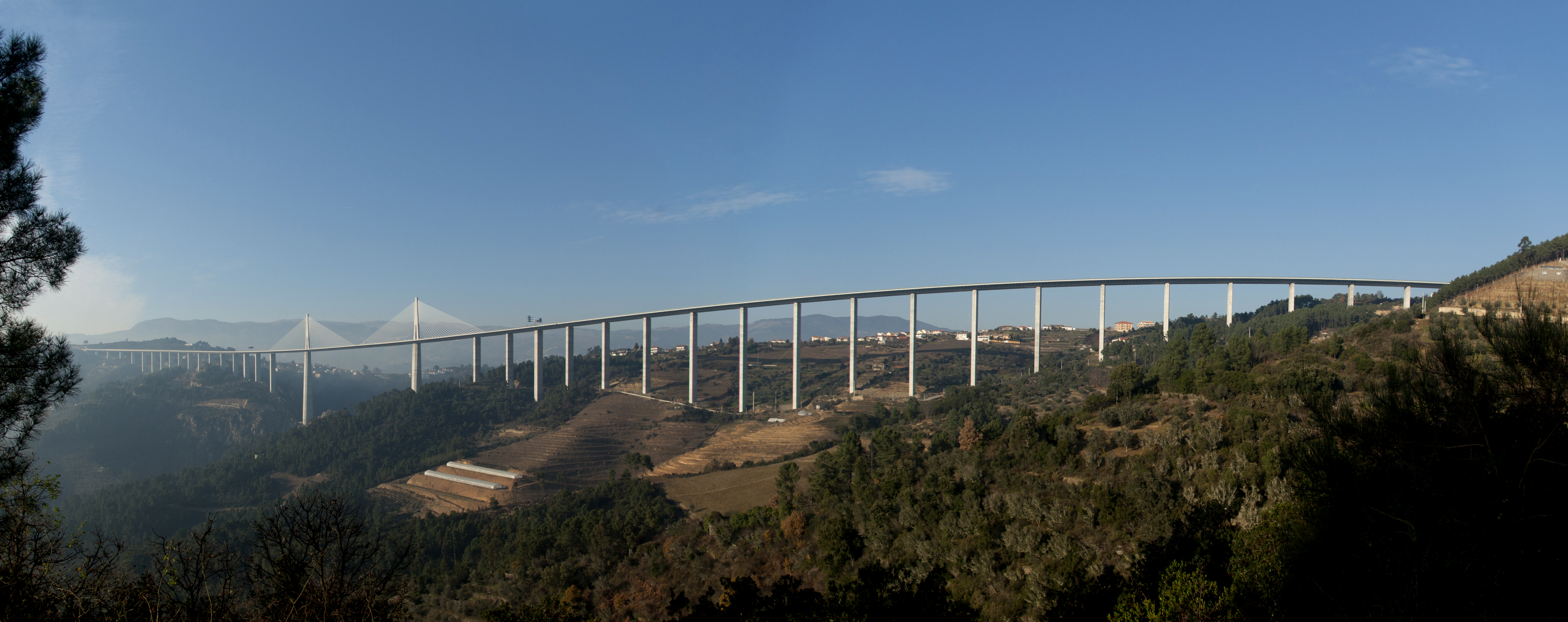
The Corgo Viaduct of the A4 motorway near Vila Real

The A 4 is a Portuguese motorway with a length of 63 kilometres (39 miles), running from Matosinhos to Amarante, where it narrows to become an IP road, signed as IP4 .

The motorway leaves the metropolitan area of Porto, through the urban areas of Ermesinde, Valongo, Paredes, Penafiel, until arriving at the mountainous town of Amarante. It is also known as one of the most dangerous motorways in the country, particularly the descent from Campo to Valongo. Many improvements are being projected by the government in this respect.

Tolls are levied.

In 2013 the highway was extended from Serra do Marão to Bragança and the Portugal–Spain border, where it connects to the N-122 road (Spain). The extension will also include a bridge reaching a height above ground of 230 metres (750 feet). Once extended the A4 will become Portugal's third-longest motorway, with a length of 223 km (139 mi).

== Marão tunnel ==
On 7 May 2016, the Marão Tunnel was opened to traffic. The Túnel do Marão is Portugal's longest road tunnel, 5.6 km (3.5 mi) long.
