= Vila Verde da Raia =

- Civil parish
- Location in Portugal
- Coordinates: 41°47′26″N 7°25′28″W
- Country: Portugal
- Region: Norte
- Intermunic. comm.: Alto Tâmega
- District: Vila Real
- Municipality: Chaves
- Time zone: UTC+00:00 (WET)
  - Summer (DST): UTC+01:00 (WEST)

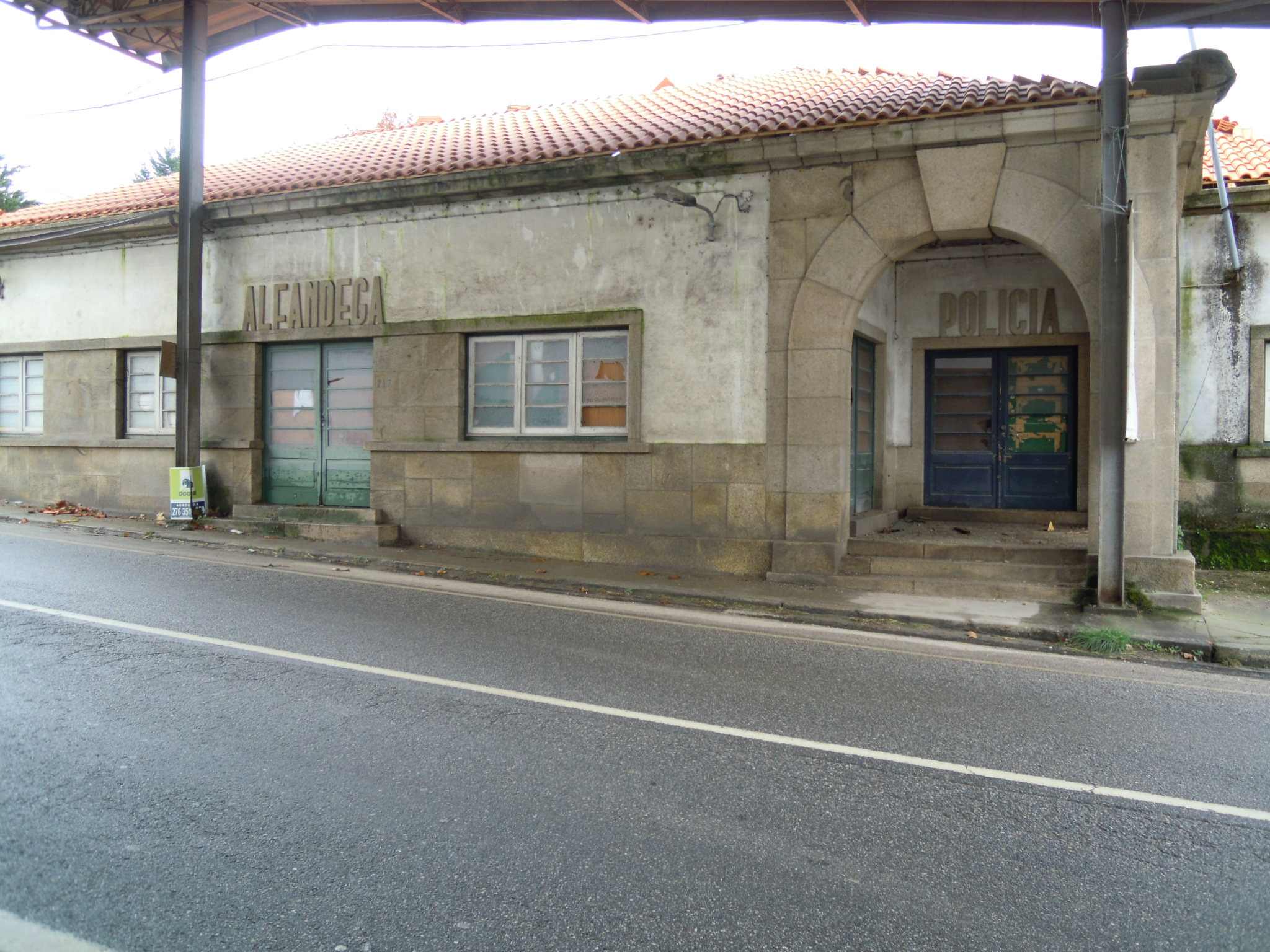
Former customs building on the border between Galicia and Portugal, in the parish of Vila Verde da Raia (Chaves).

Vila Verde da Raia is a civil parish in the municipality of Chaves, Portugal. It is one of the main crossings on the Portugal–Spain border.
