= Coina =

Former civil parish and town in Portugal

Coordinates: 38°35′32″N 9°02′14″W

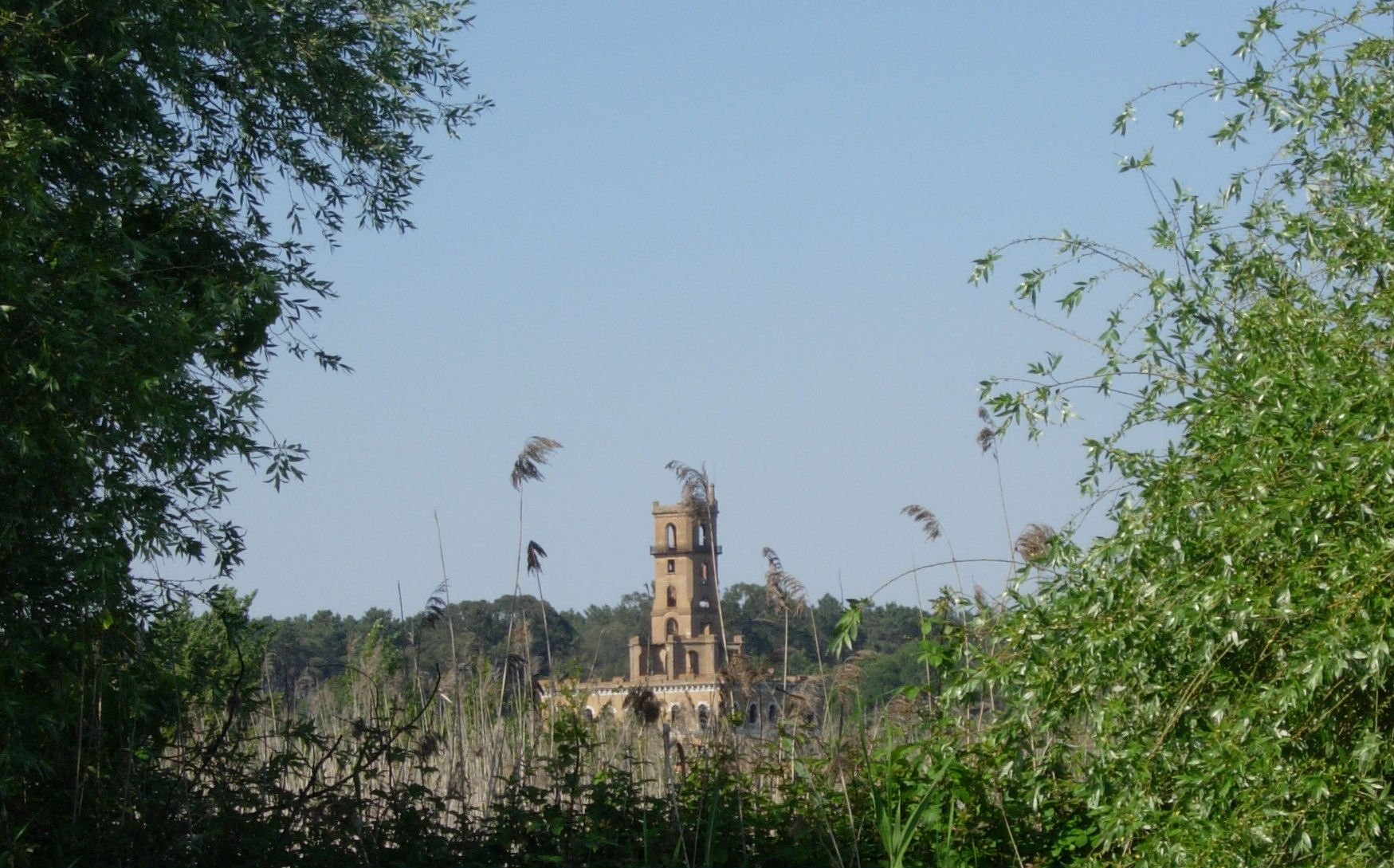

Coina was a Portuguese freguesia in the municipality of Barreiro.

== History ==
It was a town and the seat of the municipality between 1516 and the early 19th century when it was incorporated into the also extinct municipality of Alhos Vedros. It was formed by one parish and had 248 inhabitants in 1801.

It was dissolved on January 28, 2013, following a resolution of the Portuguese Assembly of the Republic enacted on January 16, 2013, by merging with the parish of Palhais, forming the new parish of Palhais e Coina.

== Heritage ==
- Real Fábrica de Vidros de Coina (Royal Glass Factory of Coina)
- Chapel of Our Lady of Remedies (Coina)
- Palace of Coina or "Castelo do Rei do Lixo" (Castle of the King of Trash)
- Tide Mill (15th century)
- Lime Kilns (18th century)
- Pillory of Coina
- Natural Heritage - Coina River Marsh and part of Mata Nacional da Machada
