= Alcabideche =

- Civil parish
- Location in Portugal
- Coordinates: 38.733°N 9.410°W
- Country: Portugal
- Region: Lisbon
- Metropolitan area: Lisbon
- District: Lisbon
- Municipality: Cascais

Area
  - Total: 39.77 km^{2} (15.36 sq mi)

Population (2011)
  - Total: 42,162
  - Density: 1,100/km^{2} (2,700/sq mi)
- Time zone: UTC+00:00 (WET)
  - Summer (DST): UTC+01:00 (WEST)

Alcabideche (Portuguese pronunciation: [alkɐβiˈðɛʃɨ]) is a parish located in the Portuguese municipality of Cascais. The population in 2011 was 42,162, in an area of 39.77 km².
