= Quintanilha =

- Civil parish
- Location in Portugal
- Coordinates: 41.751°N 6.570°W
- Country: Portugal
- Region: Norte
- Intermunic. comm.: Terras de Trás-os-Montes
- District: Bragança
- Municipality: Bragança

Area
  - Total: 20.30 km^{2} (7.84 sq mi)

Population (2011)
  - Total: 216
  - Density: 11/km^{2} (28/sq mi)
- Time zone: UTC+00:00 (WET)
  - Summer (DST): UTC+01:00 (WEST)

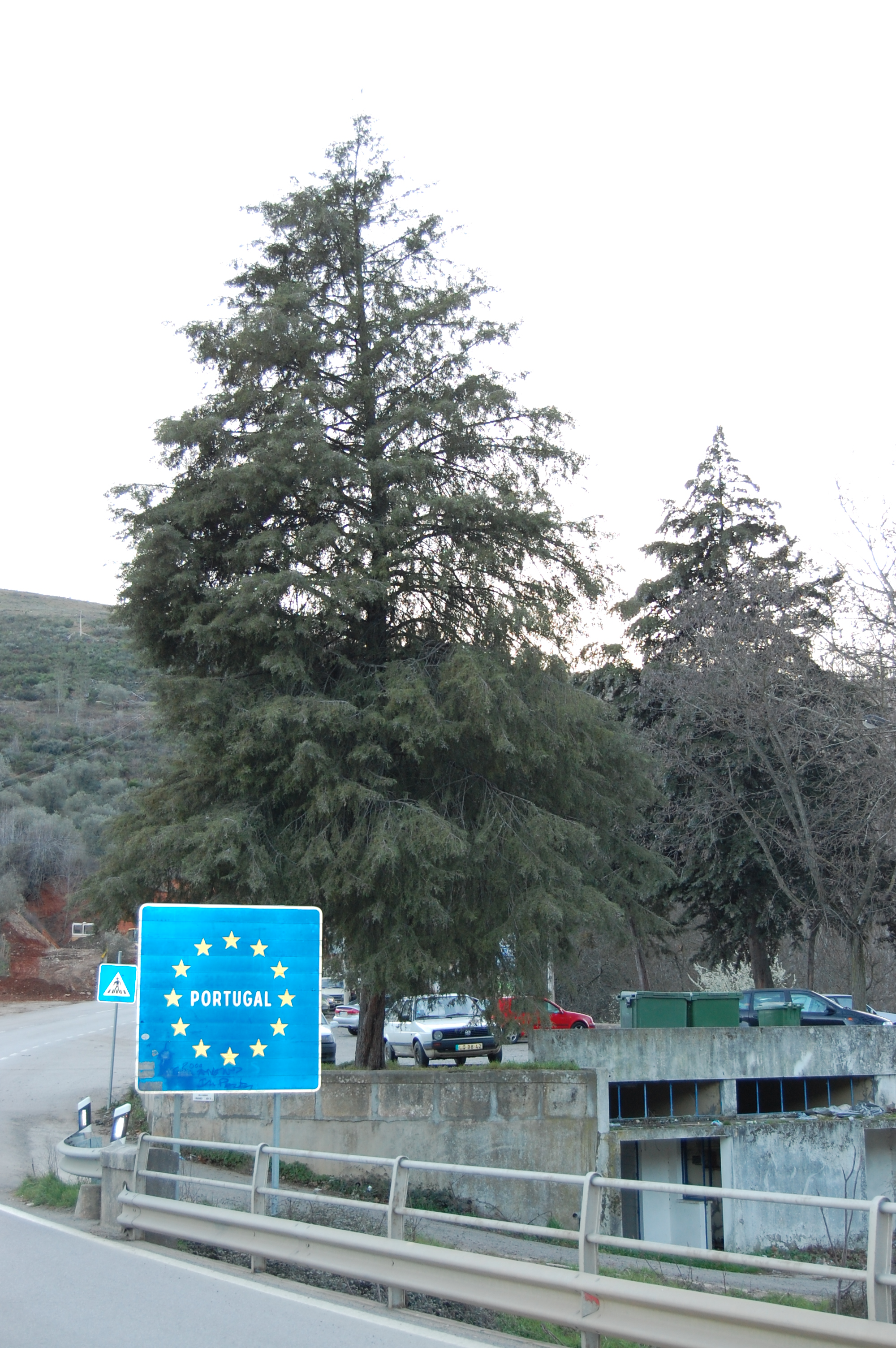
The border with Spain (municipality of Trabazos.

Quintanilha is a civil parish in the municipality of Bragança, Portugal. The population in 2011 was 216, in an area of 20.30 square kilometres (7.84 sq mi).
