= A13 motorway (Portugal) =

Road in Portugal

A13
- Autoestrada do Pinhal Interior

Route information

Location
- Country: Portugal

Highway system
- Roads in Portugal

The A13 motorway is a road in Portugal connecting Santarém to the southward turn of the A2.
