= European route E802 =

Road in trans-European E-road network

E802

Route information
- Length: 599 km (372 mi)

Major junctions
- From: Bragança
- Guarda, Castelo Branco, Évora
- To: Ourique

Location
- Countries: Portugal

Highway system
- International E-road network; A Class; B Class

European route E 802 is a European B class road in Portugal, connecting the cities Bragança and Ourique.

== Route ==
- Portugal
  - E80, E01 Bragança
  - E80 Guarda
  - E805 Castelo Branco
  - Évora
  - Ourique
