= A2 motorway (Portugal) =

Road in Portugal

A2
- Portuguese: Auto-estrada do Sul
- The A2 is highlighted in blue on this diagram of major highways in Portugal. The lower detail on the left shows the route taken by the A2 across the Tagus estuary on approaching Lisbon.

Route information
- Part of E01 E90
- Length: 240 km (150 mi)

Major junctions
- North end: Lisbon
- 35km J4 for Palmela; 56km J7 for Évora; 120km J10 for Beja; 178km J12 for Beja
- South end: Albufeira

Location
- Country: Portugal

Highway system
- Roads in Portugal

The A2 (Portuguese: Autoestrada do Sul) is a major motorway (freeway) in Portugal. It connects Lisbon, the political capital of Portugal, and the 25 de Abril Bridge to Albufeira in Algarve, the country's southernmost mainland province. The first section of the A2 was opened in 1966 and the last one was completed in 2002. It extends for fractionally more than 240 km (149 miles). The A2 is operated by Brisa - Auto-estradas de Portugal. A trip from Lisbon to Albufeira using the A2 costs €20.85 in 2022 and €23.60 in 2025

Sections of the road carry very little traffic.

A3	AADT 2011	AADT 2012	% Change 2011	% Change 2012
Maia-Santo Tirso	48,356	44,761	-7.2%	-7.4%
Ponte de Lima Norte-EN 303	6,482	5,805	-10.2%	-10.4%
Overall AADT	16,509	15,058	-8.5%	-8.8%
