= Vila Nova da Rainha =

Vila Nova da Rainha may refer to the following places in Portugal:

- Vila Nova da Rainha (Azambuja), a civil parish in the municipality of Azambuja
- Vila Nova da Rainha (Tondela), a civil parish in the municipality of Tondela
