= Giovanni Lopez de Andrade =

Portuguese Roman Catholic prelate

Most Reverend Giovanni Lopez de Andrade
- Archbishop of Otranto
- Church: Catholic Church
- Archdiocese: Archdiocese of Otranto
- In office: 1623–1628
- Predecessor: Lucio de Morra
- Successor: Fabrizio degli Antinori

Orders
- Consecration: 30 November 1623 by Giovanni Garzia Mellini

Personal details
- Born: 1569 Azambuja, Portugal
- Died: 22 August 1628 (age 59) Otranto, Italy

Giovanni Lopez de Andrade, O.S.A. or Diego Lopez de Andrade (1569–1628) was a Roman Catholic prelate who served as Archbishop of Otranto (1623–1628).

== Biography ==
Giovanni Lopez de Andrade was born in Azambuja, Portugal in 1569 and ordained a priest in the Order of Saint Augustine. On 20 November 1623, he was appointed during the papacy of Pope Paul V as Archbishop of Otranto. On 30 November 1623, he was consecrated bishop by Giovanni Garzia Mellini, Cardinal-Priest of Santi Quattro Coronati with Niceforo Melisseno Comneno, Bishop of Crotone, and Alessandro Bosco, Bishop of Gerace, serving as co-consecrators. He served as Archbishop of Otranto until his death on 22 August 1628.

Catholic Church titles
Preceded by Lucio de Morra	Archbishop of Otranto; 1623–1628	Succeeded by Fabrizio degli Antinori
