= Vale do Paraíso (Azambuja) =

- Civil parish
- Location in Portugal
- Coordinates: 39.115°N 8.885°W
- Country: Portugal
- Region: Oeste e Vale do Tejo
- Intermunic. comm.: Lezíria do Tejo
- District: Lisbon
- Municipality: Azambuja

Area
  - Total: 4.44 km^{2} (1.71 sq mi)

Population (2011)
  - Total: 880
  - Density: 200/km^{2} (510/sq mi)
- Time zone: UTC+00:00 (WET)
  - Summer (DST): UTC+01:00 (WEST)

Vale do Paraíso is a civil parish in the municipality of Azambuja, Portugal. The population in 2011 was 880, in an area of 4.44 km^{2}.
