= Opel Combo =

Van

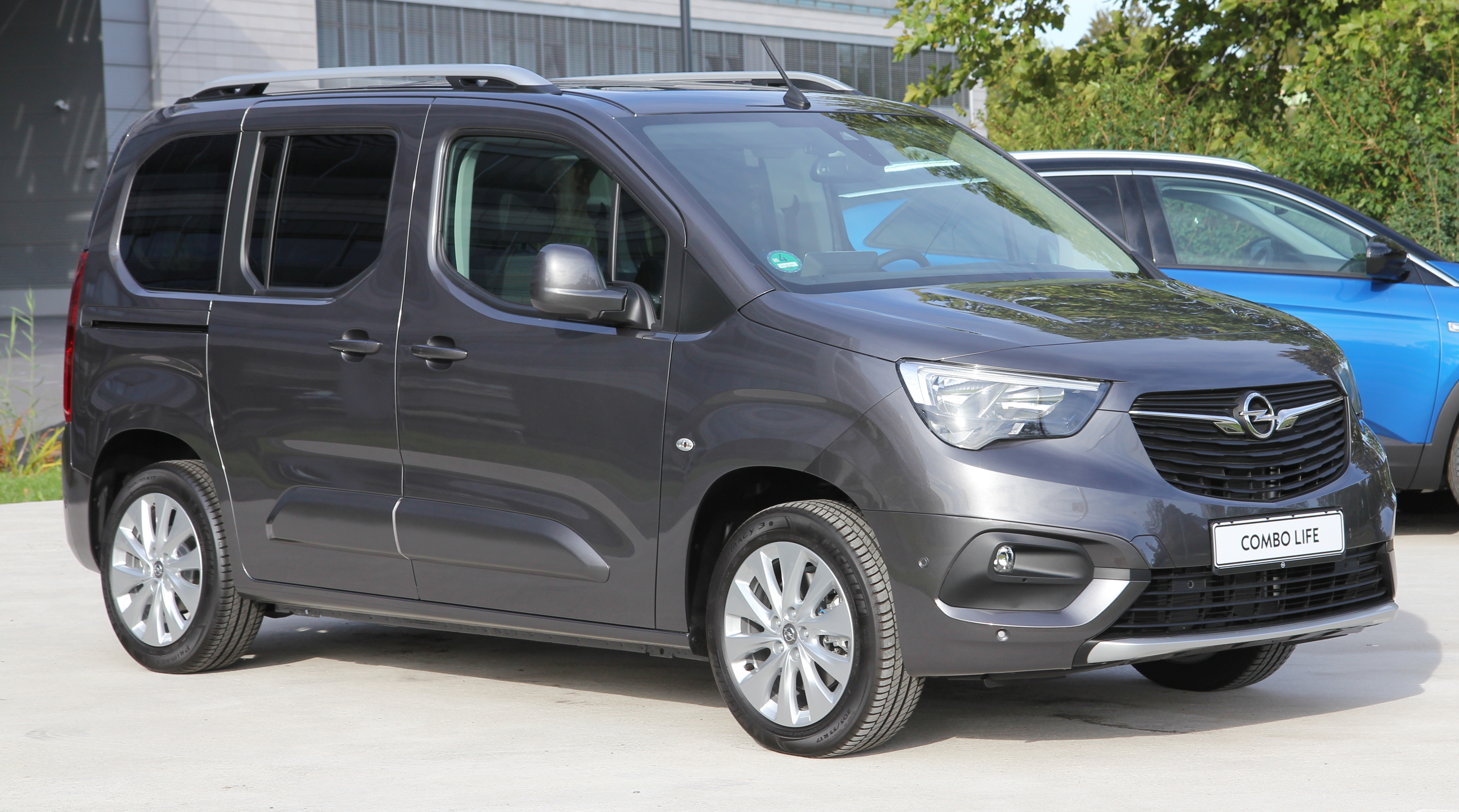

Overview
- Manufacturer: Opel (Note: General Motors (1986–2017); PSA Group (2017–2021); Stellantis (2021–present))
- Production: 1986–present 1998-2012 (Chevrolet Combo in Chile and Argentina)

Body and chassis
- Class: Panel van, leisure activity vehicle
- Body style: Van
- Layout: Front-engine, front-wheel drive

Chronology
- Predecessor: Bedford Beagle; Bedford Chevanne; Bedford HA; Bedford Rascal; Opel/Vauxhall Astravan H
- Successor: Chevrolet N200/N300 (for all Chevrolet rebadges only)

The Opel Combo is a panel van and leisure activity vehicle from the German automaker Opel. The Combo first appeared in 1993, a second generation model was introduced in 2001, and the third was manufactured from December 2011 to December 2017, based on the Fiat Doblò. The name "Combo" was previously applied as a suffix to a three-door panel van body style of Opel Kadett E from 1986 until 1993.

Opel/Vauxhall joined Groupe PSA in March 2017: the fourth generation Combo, launched in March 2018, shares the platform and bodywork of the Peugeot Rifter and Partner, as well as the Citroën Berlingo.

The Combo B and Combo C share platforms, vital components and some body panels with contemporary subcompact Opel Corsas, which used to be a typical pedigree for such a vehicle. The generations are denoted B and C in typical Opel fashion, but Holden applied the codes SB and XC respectively, reflecting the relation with SB and XC Holden Barinas (Opel Corsa B and C, respectively).

== Kadett Combo (Combo A; 1986) ==
Kadett Combo
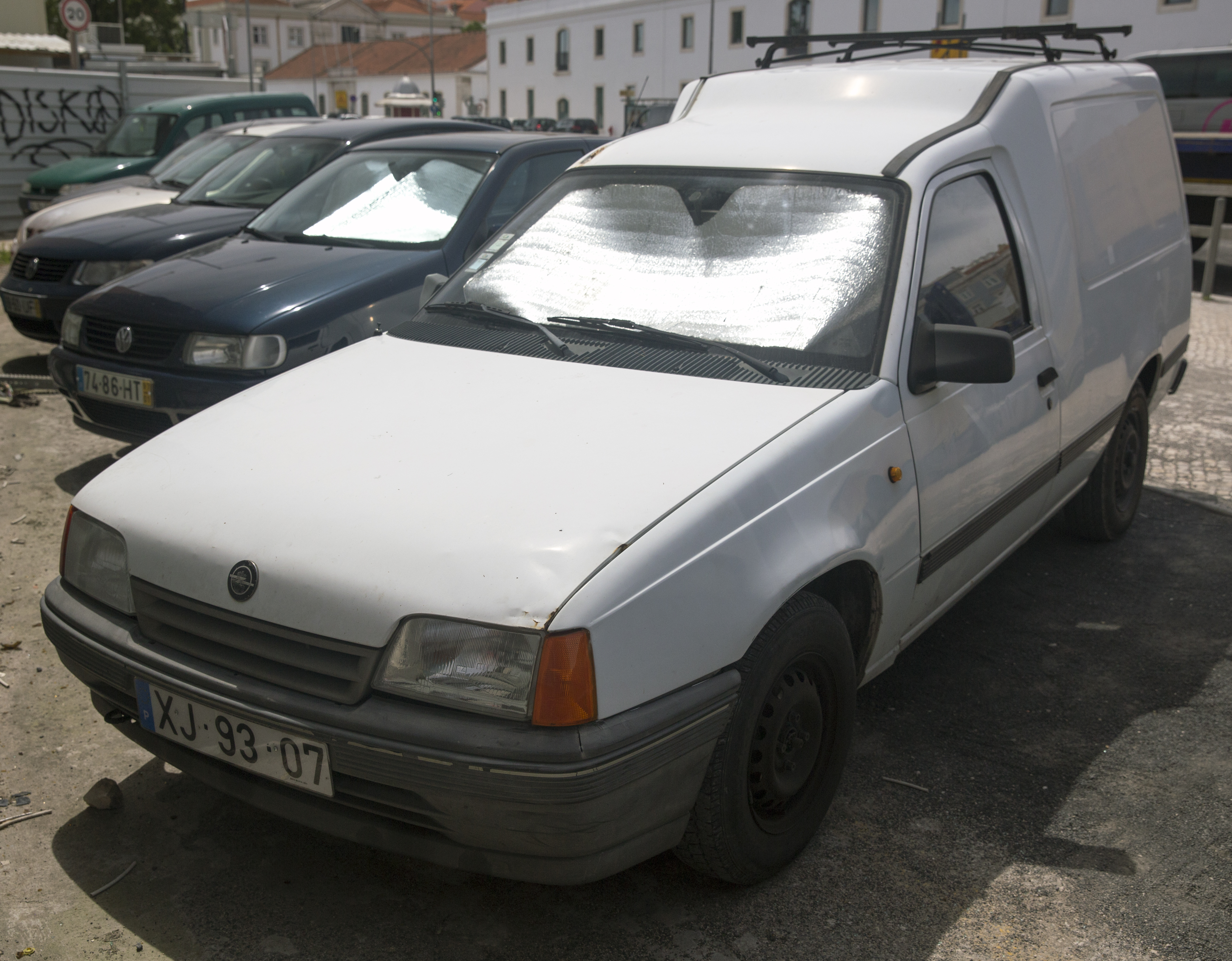
- Opel Combo (1989–1993)

Overview
- Also called: Bedford Astramax (United Kingdom); Vauxhall Astramax (United Kingdom)
- Production: February 1986 – August 1993
- Assembly: Portugal: Azambuja (General Motors Portugal); United Kingdom: Ellesmere Port (Vauxhall Ellesmere Port)

Body and chassis
- Class: 3-door panel van
- Platform: T-body platform
- Related: Opel Kadett E

The Opel Kadett Combo was introduced in January 1986, and finished production in August 1993. It was based on the Opel Kadett E small family car. It was built in the United Kingdom, at Ellesmere Port by Vauxhall until January 1989. This was when the model was facelifted, with a new grille separate from the bumper (as for the Kadett).

At the same time, production was transferred to Azambuja, Portugal and the vans were now built by Opel. In Germany, it was sold with a 1.3 litre petrol engine or a 1.6 (later 1.7) litre diesel unit. The 1.3 petrol unit was then changed to a 1.4. Buyers in some countries, including the United Kingdom, also had the choice of a 90 PS (66 kW; 89 hp) 1.6-liter petrol unit.

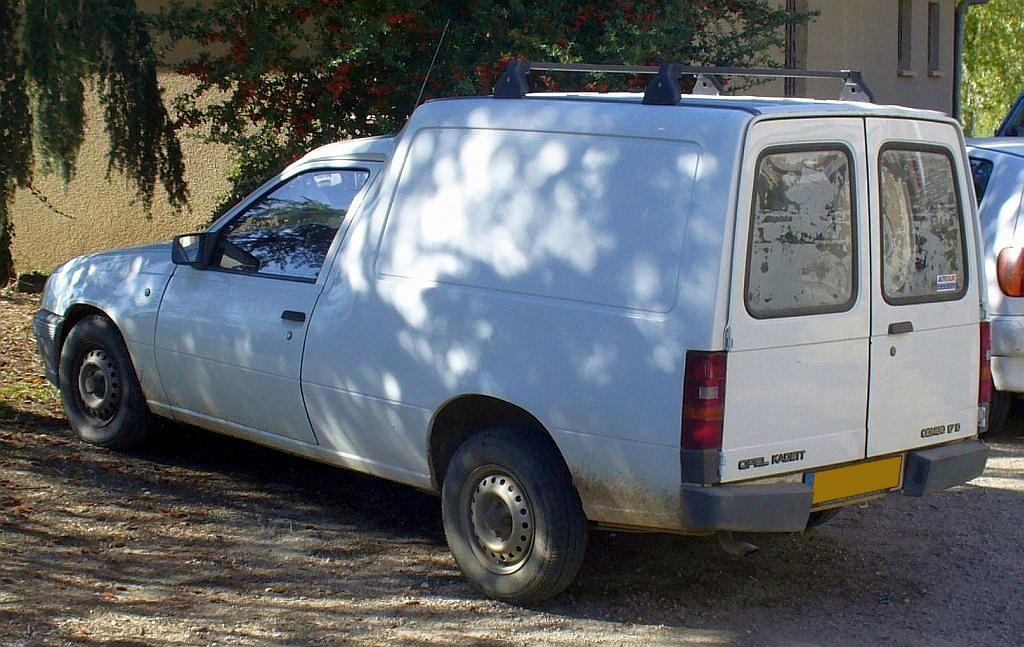
Opel Kadett Combo 1.7 D (1986–1989), rear

In the United Kingdom, the three door estate based van was known as both the Bedford and Vauxhall Astravan, and the high roof van as the Bedford Astramax, later sold as a Vauxhall. The changeover from Bedford to Vauxhall took place on 1 June 1990, as Bedfords were better known as a producer of heavier trucks.

The Astramax was available in base or somewhat better equipped L versions. Both models were offered in 365 or 560 versions, referring to the payload in kilograms.

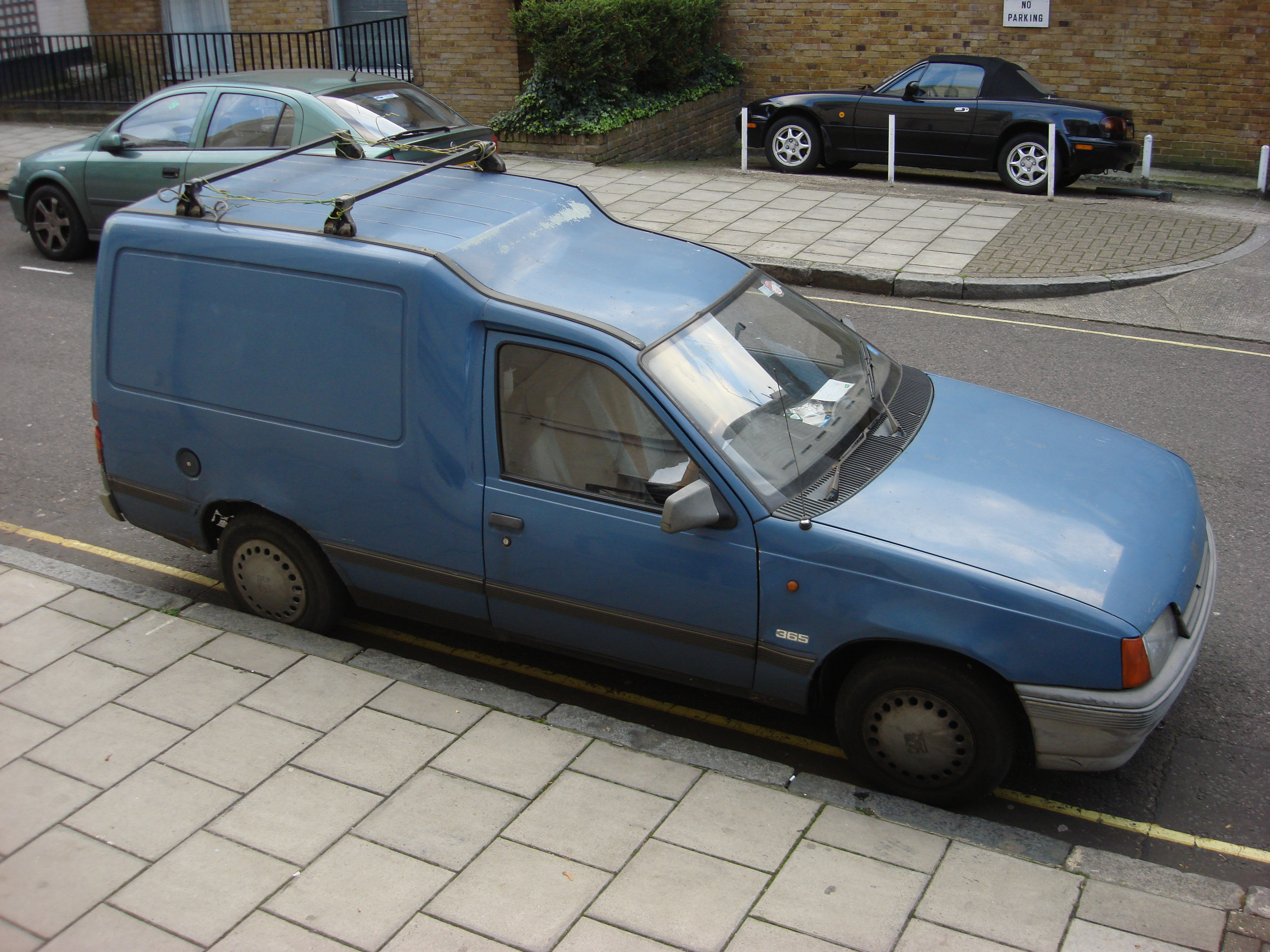
1990–1993 Vauxhall Astramax 365

== Combo B (1993–2001) ==
Combo B
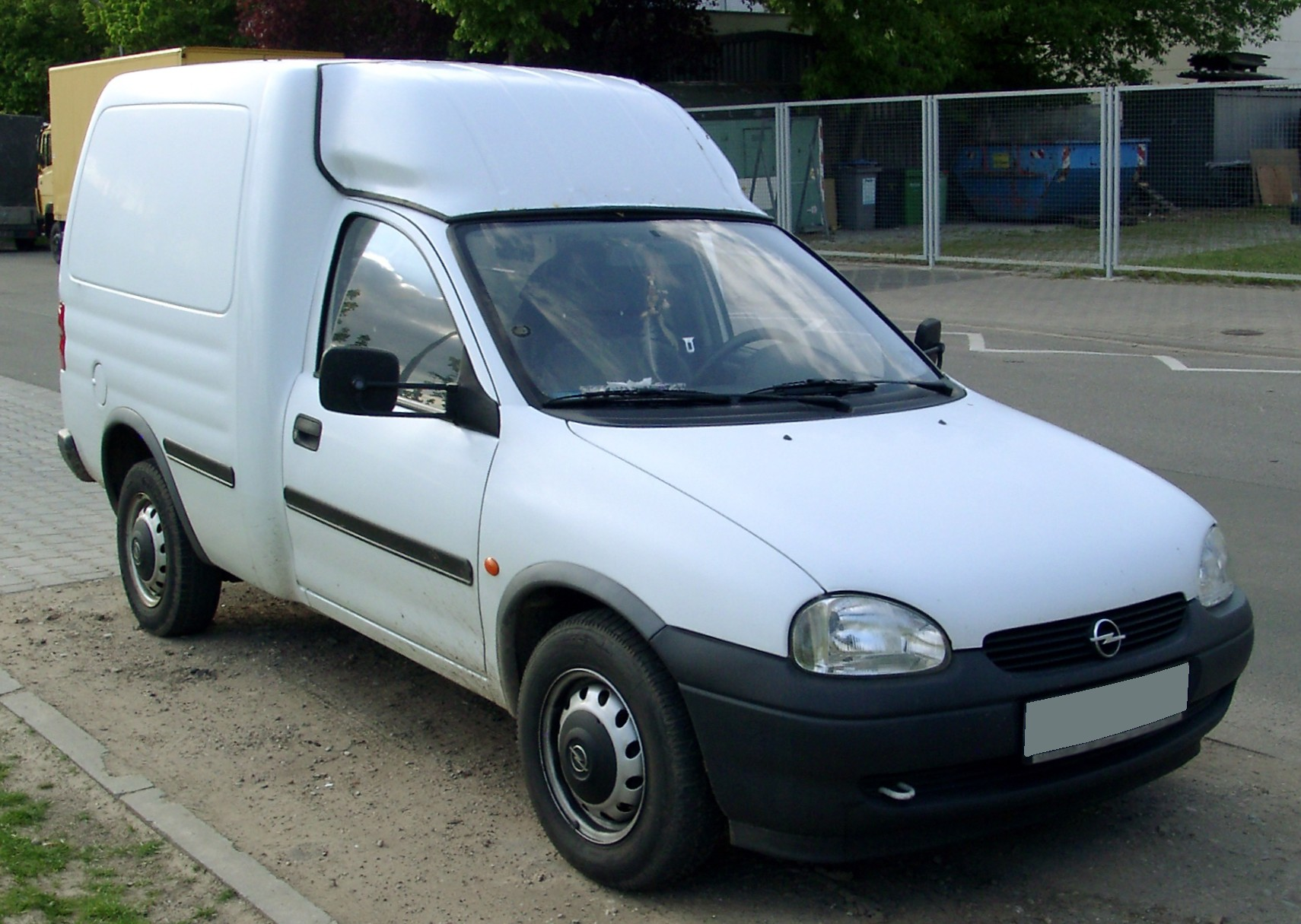

Overview
- Also called: Vauxhall Combo; Holden Combo (SB); Chevrolet Combo; Shanghai Auto Saibao
- Production: November 1993 – December 2001; 2002–2005 (China)
- Assembly: Portugal: Azambuja

Body and chassis
- Body style: 3-door panel van 3-door LAV
- Platform: GM4200 platform
- Related: Opel Corsa B

The first generation of Combo, launched in October 1993, was based heavily on the Opel Corsa B, launched six months earlier. The front part (up to the B-pillar) is practically identical with the Corsa (except for the roof spoiler), but the platform (and thus wheelbase and the body in general) is extended to accommodate a tall, boxy cargo compartment, capable of carrying a Euro-pallet.

The Combo B had symmetrical twin rear doors that opened to the side (rather than a single tailgate). These are counted as a single "door" when referring to the body style as three door.

Following the increasing popularity of leisure activity vehicles, Opel launched a five passenger version of the Combo in the summer of 1995, called Opel Combo Tour. It differed from the panel van version by having the cargo section fitted with side windows, and a three-passenger split folding bench seat.

Although Combo's primary market was Europe, it has also been sold on other continents, in markets where GM traditionally use Opel derived models. As the Azambuja Opel plant in Portugal is the sole production site of all Combos, all those models were replaced gradually with the Combo C in 2001.

The Combo was also produced in relatively small numbers by SAIC subsidiary SAIC-Yizheng as the "Shanghai Auto (Shangqi) Saibao SAC6420", equipped with the same 1.6 litre engine and five speed manual transmission as the Buick Sail. Built from 2002 until 2005, there was also a DeLuxe version available, with alloy wheels and other extras.

Holden in Australia launched the SB series Combo in February 1996. It offered the 1.4 litre C14NZ engine, upgraded to C14SE specification in 1997. Sales continued until 2002, although the last SB Combos were built in 2001, but complianced as models of 2002. Production of the Combo A ended in August 2001.

=== Gallery ===
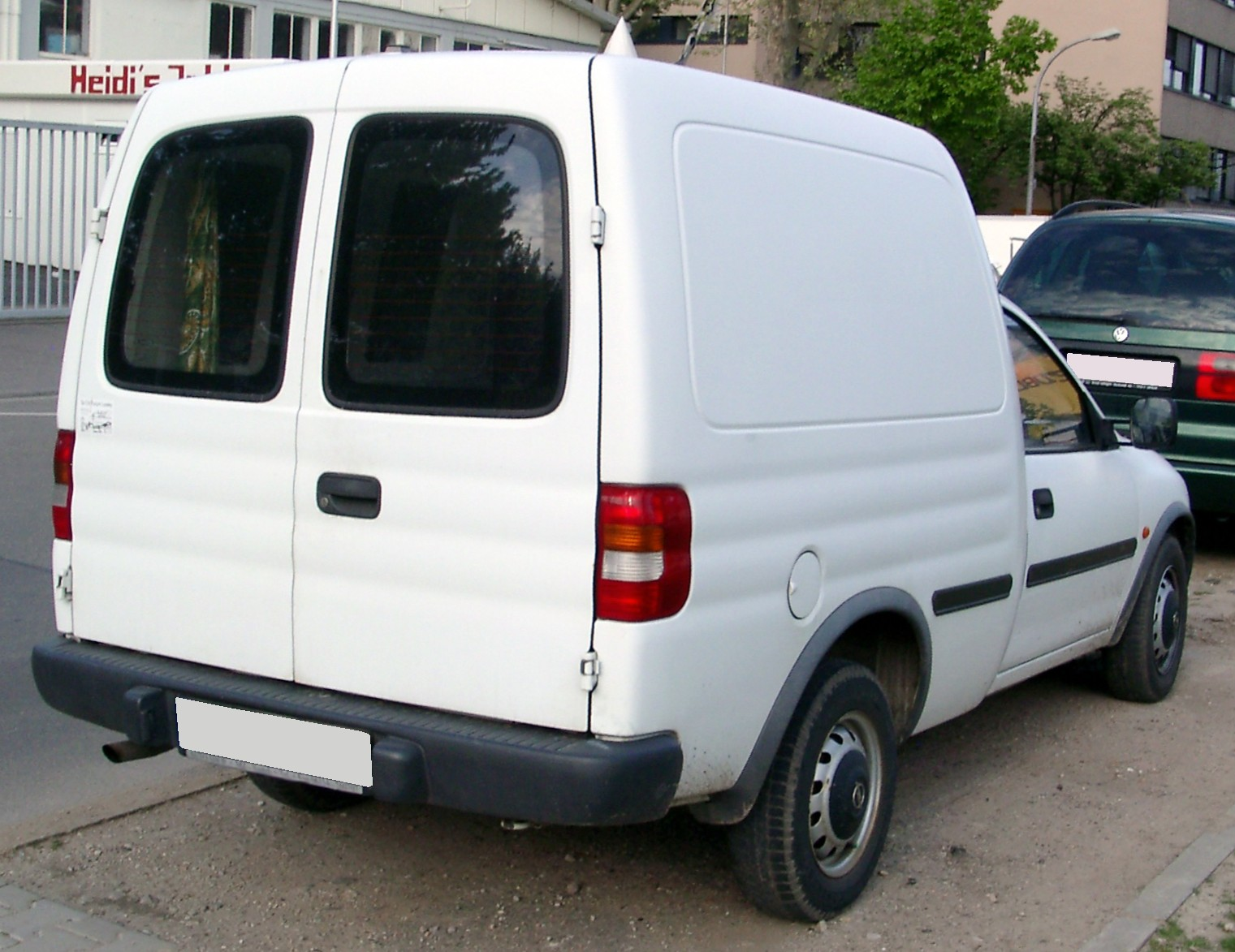
Opel Combo B (rear view)

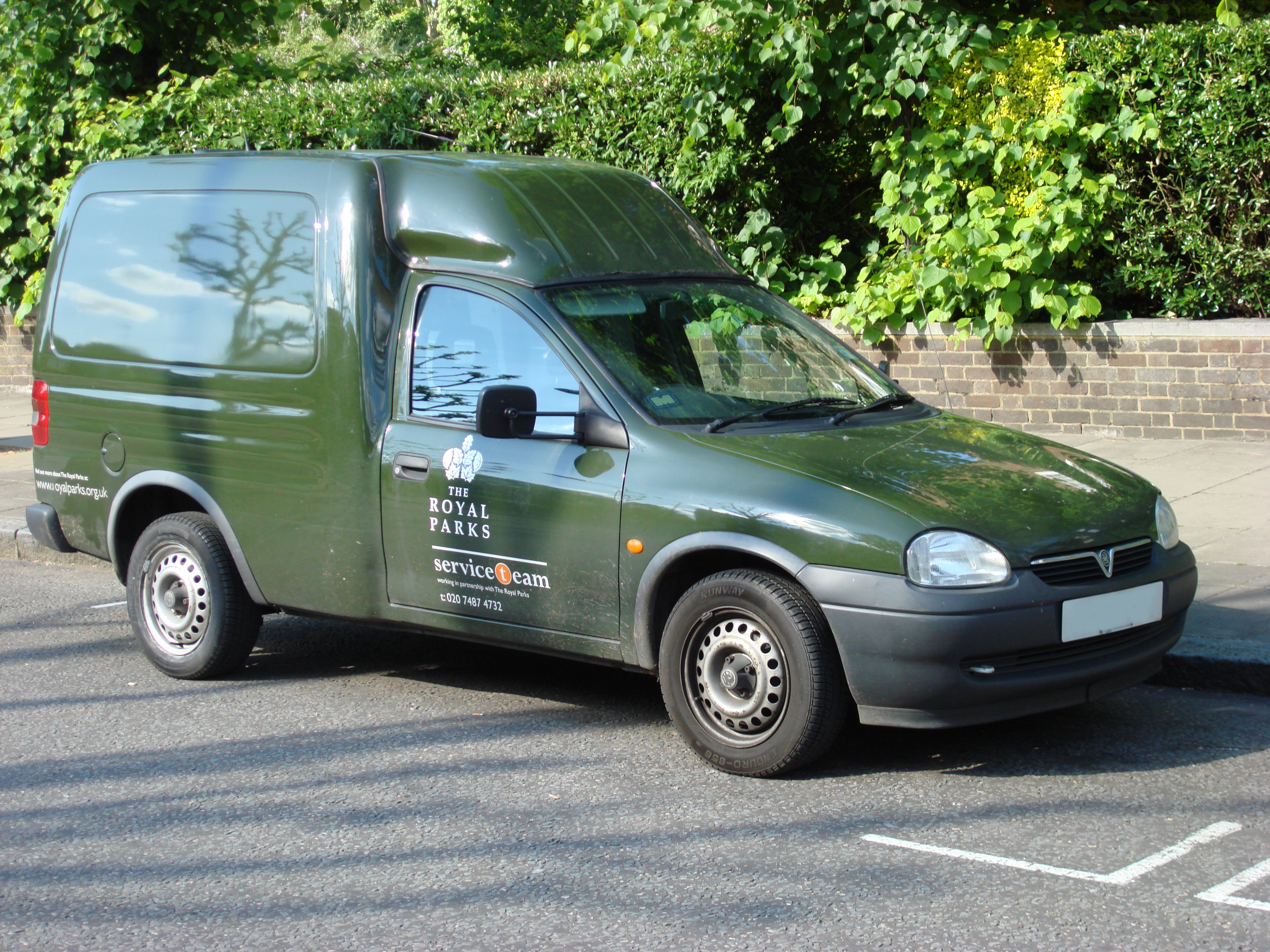
Vauxhall Combo van (United Kingdom)

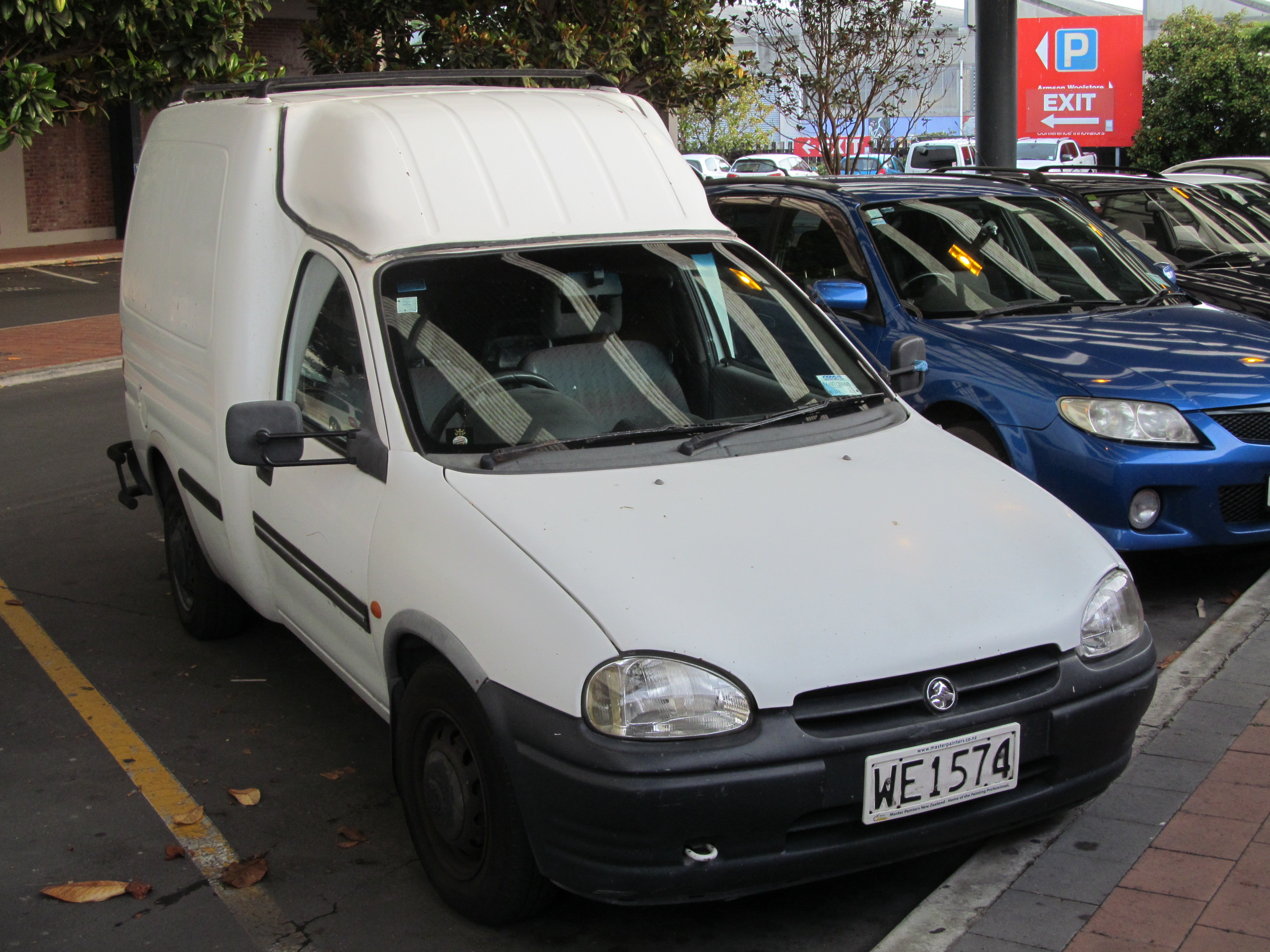
Holden Combo (SB) van (Australia & New Zealand)

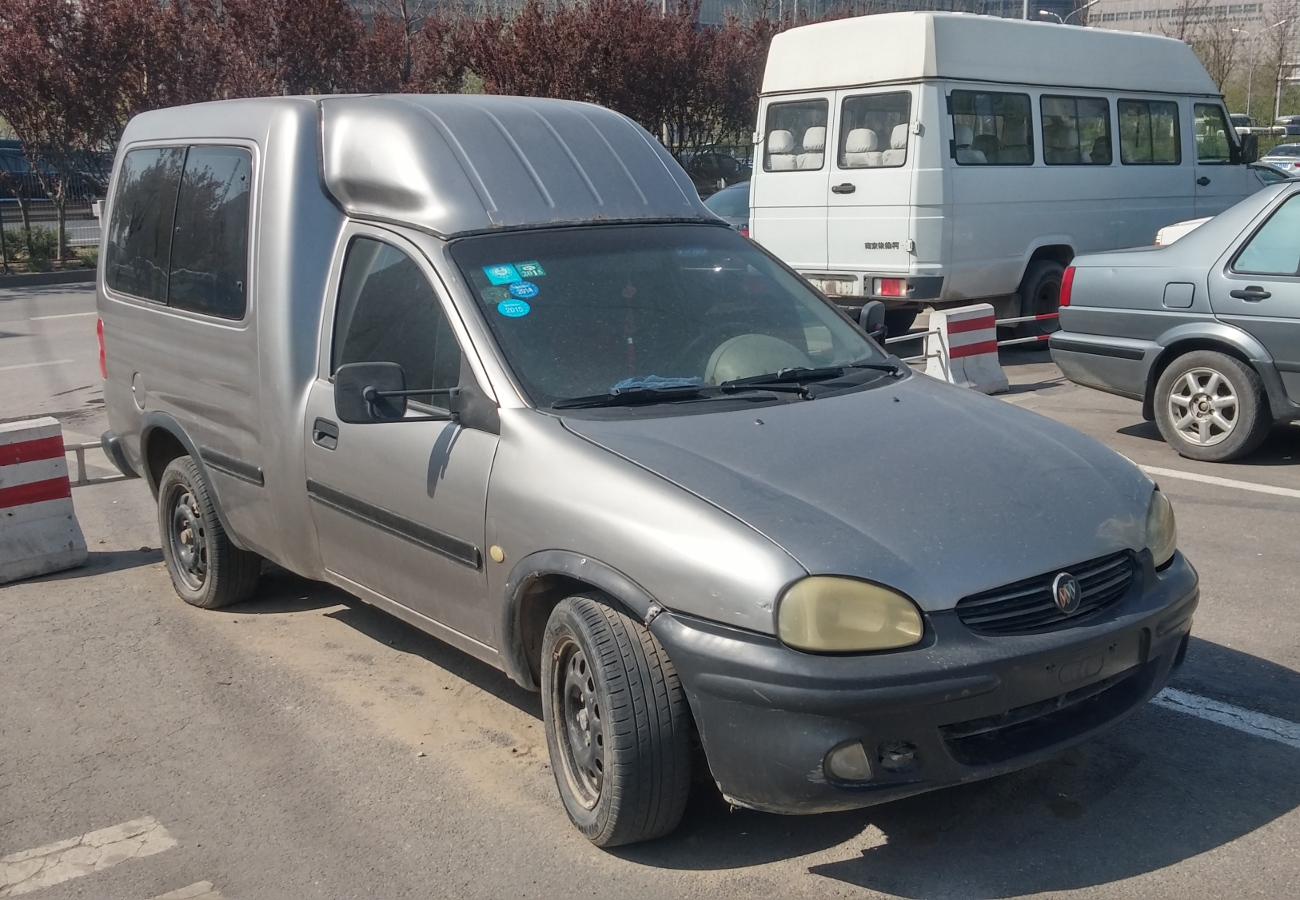
Shanghai Auto Saibao SAC6420 (China)

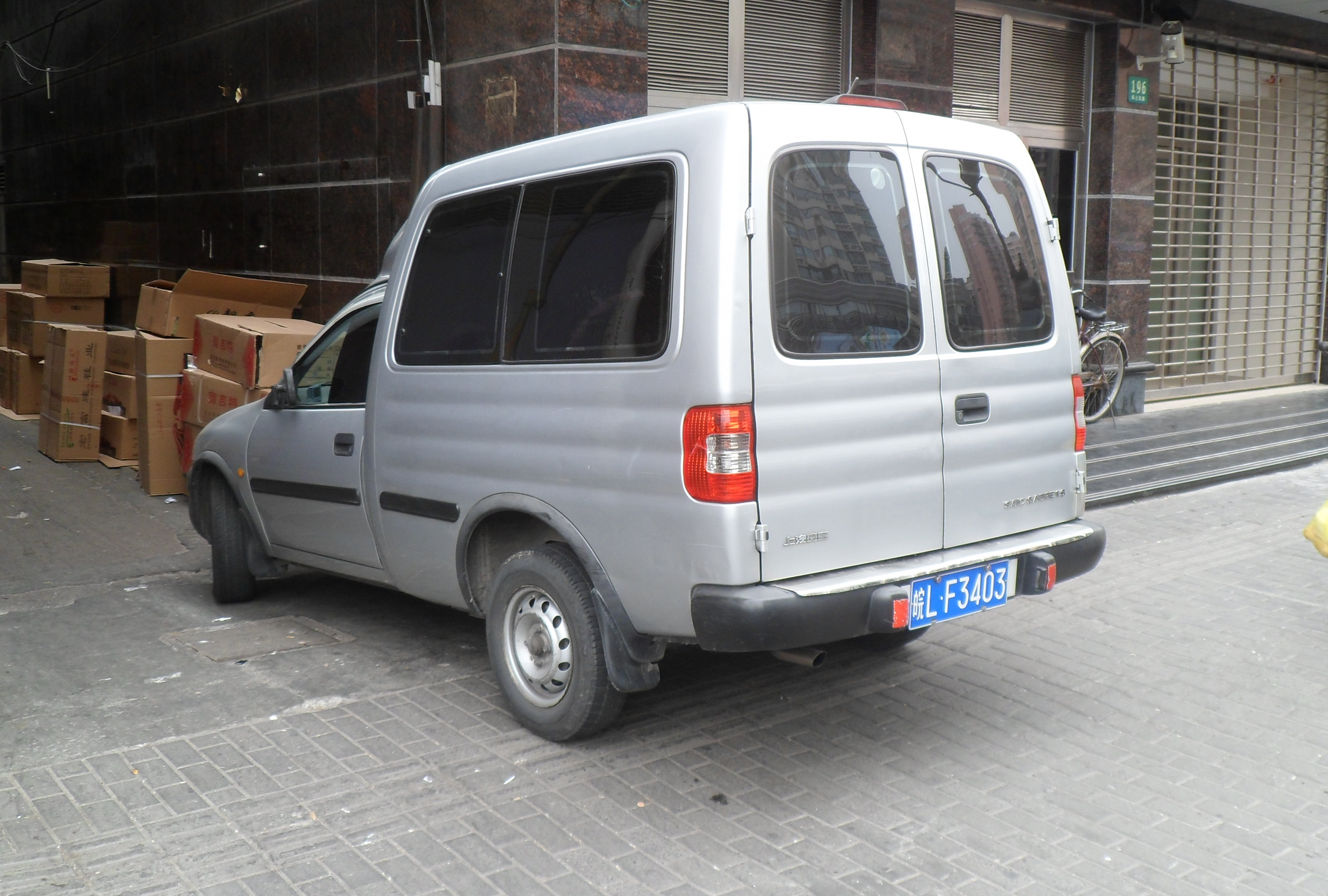
Shanghai Auto Saibao SAC6420 (rear)

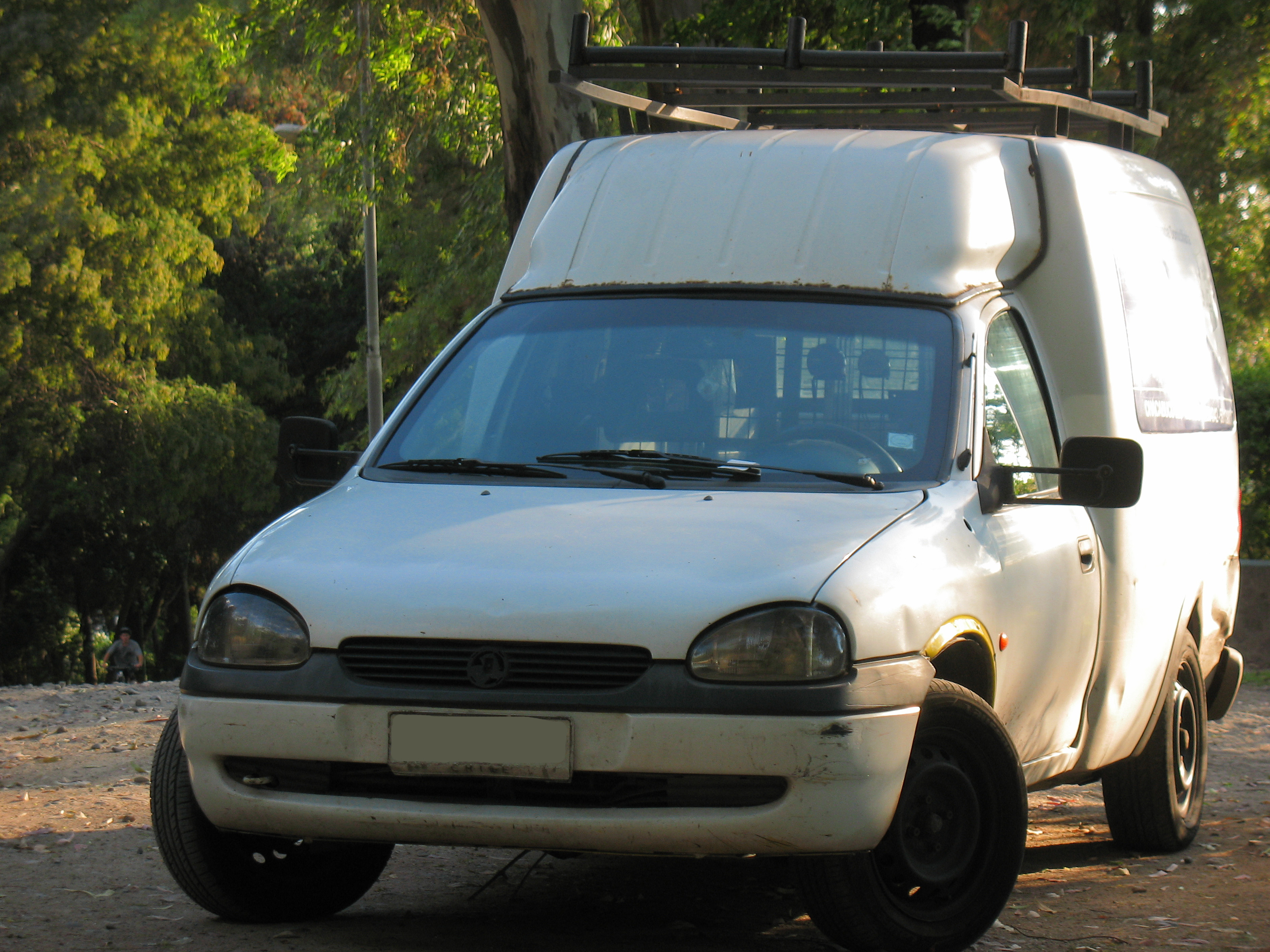
Chevrolet Combo (Chile)

=== Names and markets ===
- Opel Combo – Europe (except for United Kingdom) and Chile before the rebranding in the end of the 1990s
- Vauxhall Combo – United Kingdom
- Holden Combo – Australia, New Zealand
- Chevrolet Combo – Chile, Argentina
- Shanghai Auto Saibao SAC6420 - China

=== Engines ===
- 1.4 L I4 8V 44 kW (60 PS), 60 kW (82 PS) Ecotec
- 1.6 L I4 8V 60 kW (82 PS) Ecotec
- 1.7 L I4 8V 44 kW (60 PS) Circle-L Diesel

== Combo C (2002–2012) ==
Combo C
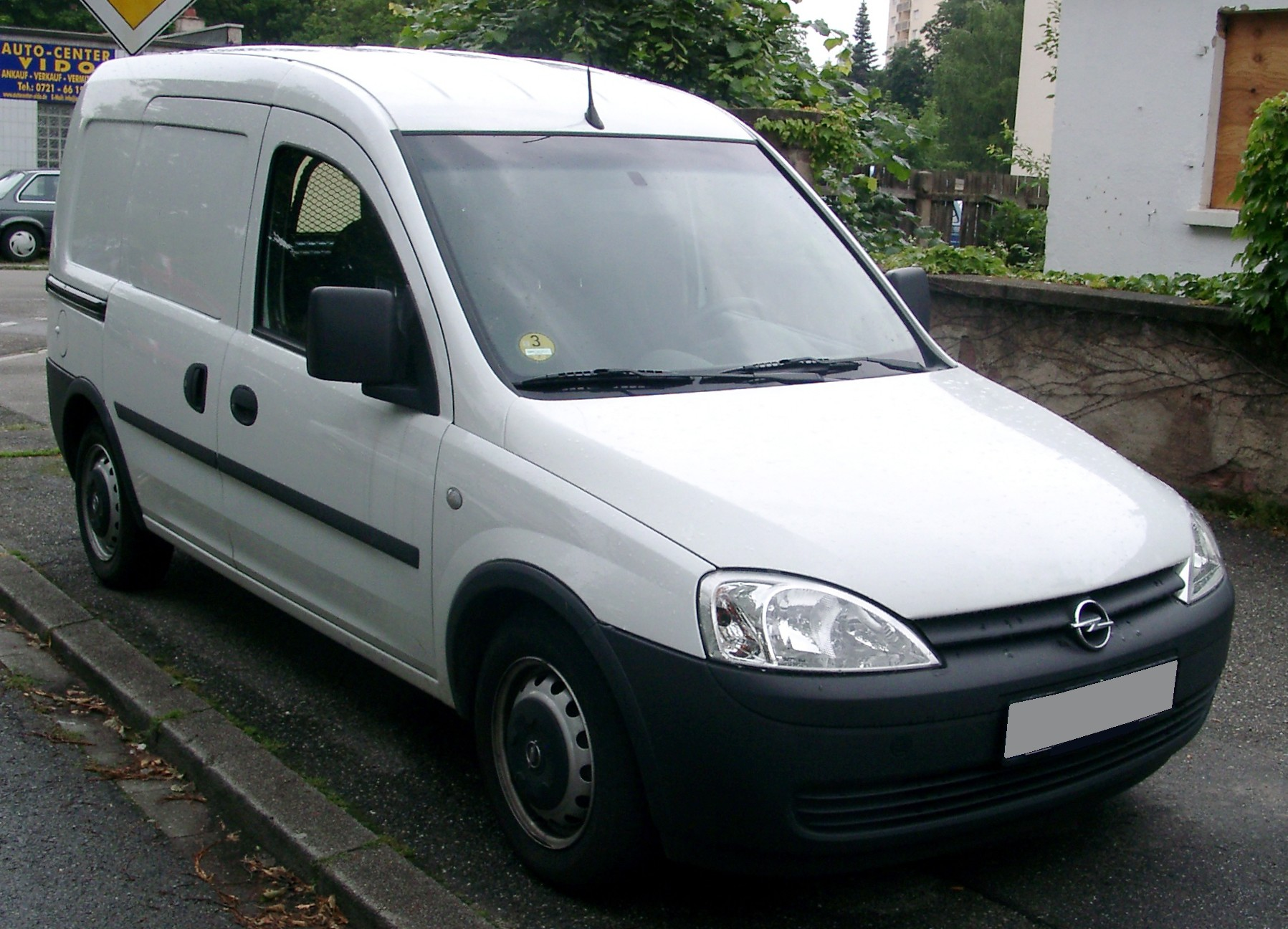
- Opel Combo (2002–2006)

Overview
- Also called: Vauxhall Combo; Holden Combo (XC); Chevrolet Combo
- Production: January 2002 – January 2012; 2002-2013 (Holden Combo)
- Assembly: Portugal: Azambuja (2001–2006); Spain: Zaragoza (2007–2011)

Body and chassis
- Body style: 4/5-door panel van 5-door LAV
- Platform: Gamma platform
- Related: Opel Corsa C Opel Meriva A Chevrolet Montana

Powertrain
- Engine: Petrol: 1.4 L Twinport I4; 1.6 L Z16SE I4; Diesel: 1.3 L CDTI I4; 1.3 L EcoFlex CDTI I4; 1.7 L DI I4; 1.7 L DTI I4; 1.7 L CDTI I4; CNG: 1.6 L Z16YNG I4
- Transmission: 5-speed manual 5-speed Easytronic automated manual

Dimensions
- Wheelbase: 2,715 mm (106.9 in)
- Length: 4,332 mm (170.6 in)
- Width: 1,685 mm (66.3 in)
- Height: 1,800 mm (70.9 in)

The second generation was launched at the Frankfurt Motor Show, in September 2001. While most competitors severed their connections with their subcompact brethren, Opel decided to base the vehicle on the Corsa again. The use of subcompact Gamma platform constrained the overall width of the vehicle. The front clip is thus still shared with the Corsa, although now only back to the A-pillar. This allowed Opel to more fully integrate the overall design of the car, giving it a "flush" look more in line with its competitors.

Compared to previous generation, the Combo C gained sliding rear side doors (versions with either single passenger side door or double doors are available). Sales began in January 2002.

An Opel Combo Tour version was also introduced, followed by Opel Combo Tour Tramp (Combo Tour Arizona in some markets), in an effort to attract leisure activity vehicle buyers. Combo Tour Tramp/Arizona was thought as a more off-road recreational vehicle.

It features enhanced suspension tuning, increased ground clearance, chassis protection covers and numerous styling details that differentiate it from standard Combo Tours, with the intention to conjure a sturdy, outdoor sports related image. The Combo Tour was not offered by Vauxhall in the United Kingdom. Commercial van versions retained the symmetrical twin rear doors, while the Tour versions have an option of a single tailgate (opening to the top). The tailgate is standard on Tour Tramp/Arizona.

In December 2006, the Azambuja, Portugal factory closed down, and the production of the Opel Combo transferred to Zaragoza, Spain in 2007. Holden in Australia launched the XC series Combo in September 2002. It offered the 1.6 litre Z16SE engine, upgraded to 1.4 litre Z14XEP specification in December 2004 for the MY05 update.

Although production ended in the end of 2011, Holden in Australia and New Zealand stockpiled sufficient Combo inventory to last until 2013, with the final 2011 build vehicles complianced in the beginning of 2012. In August 2013, CarAdvice announced that the Holden Combo had been quietly discontinued, and will not be replaced by the Combo D, available to European customers.

Production of the Combo C ended in the end of 2011, in time for the December 2011 launch of the Combo D, which is based on the Fiat Doblò.

In Chile and Argentina, was sold as Chevrolet Combo, with Chevrolet logo instead of Vauxhall logo with Vauxhall "V" badge in same as UK market.

=== Gallery ===
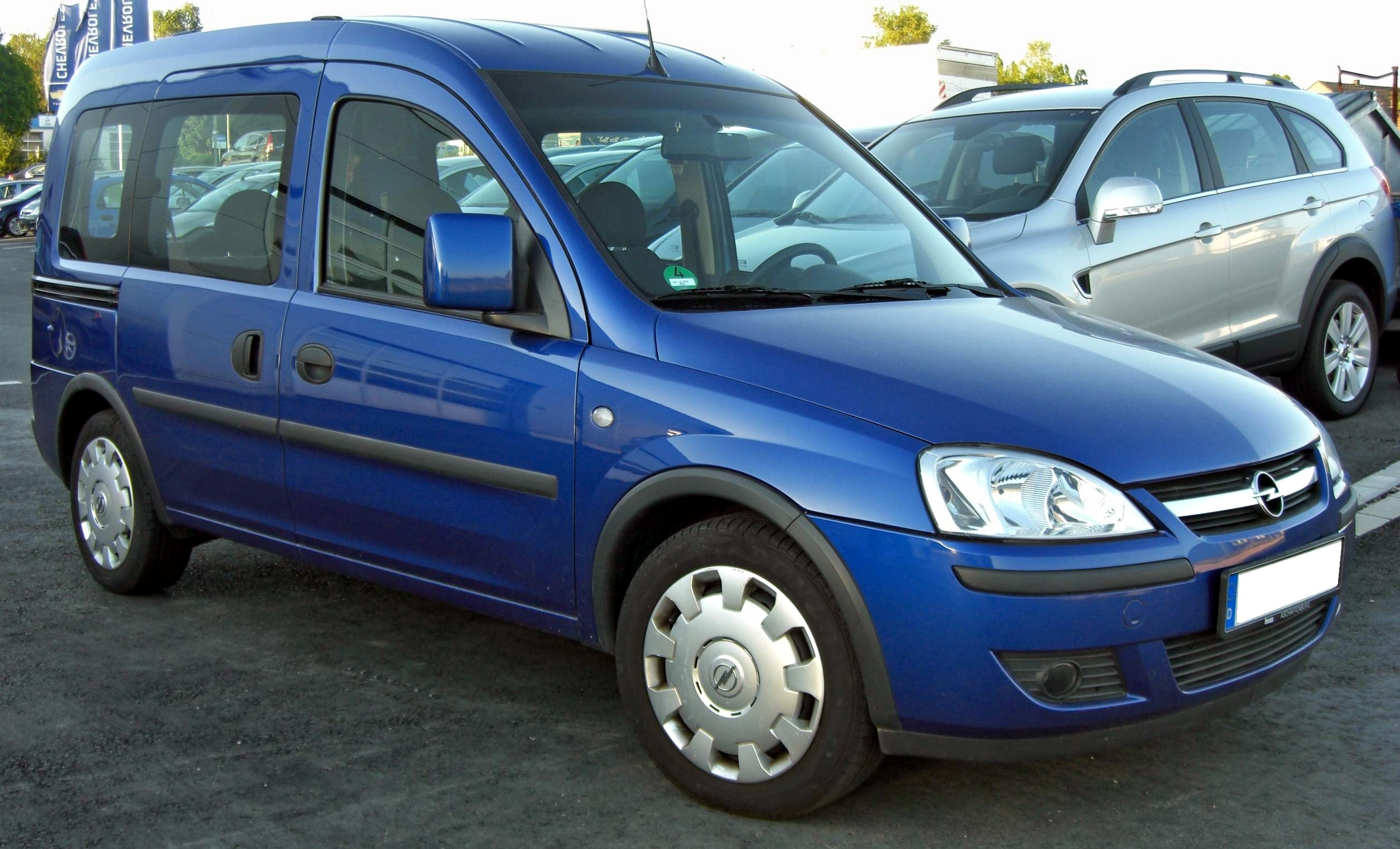
Opel Combo C Tour

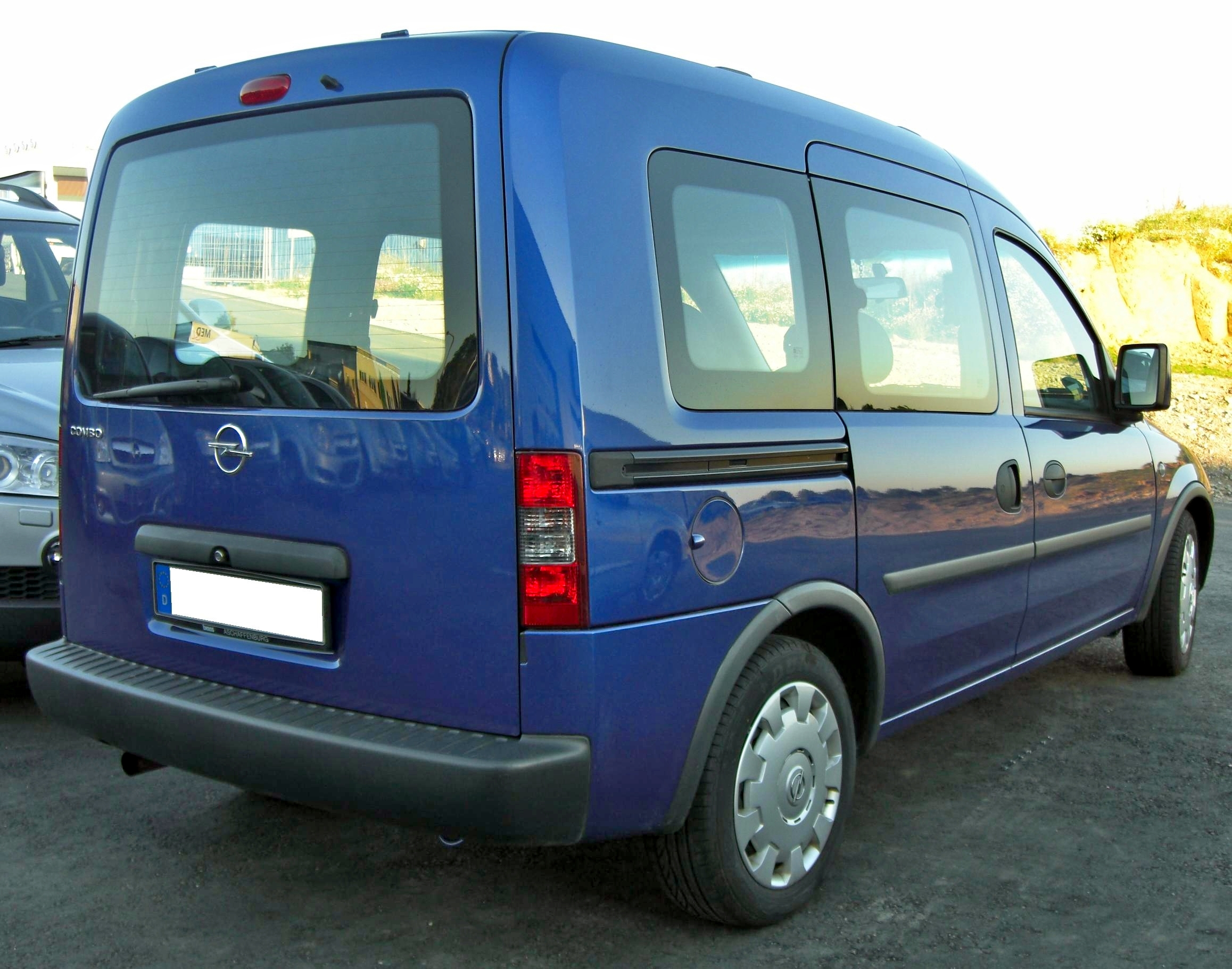
Opel Combo C Tour (rear view)

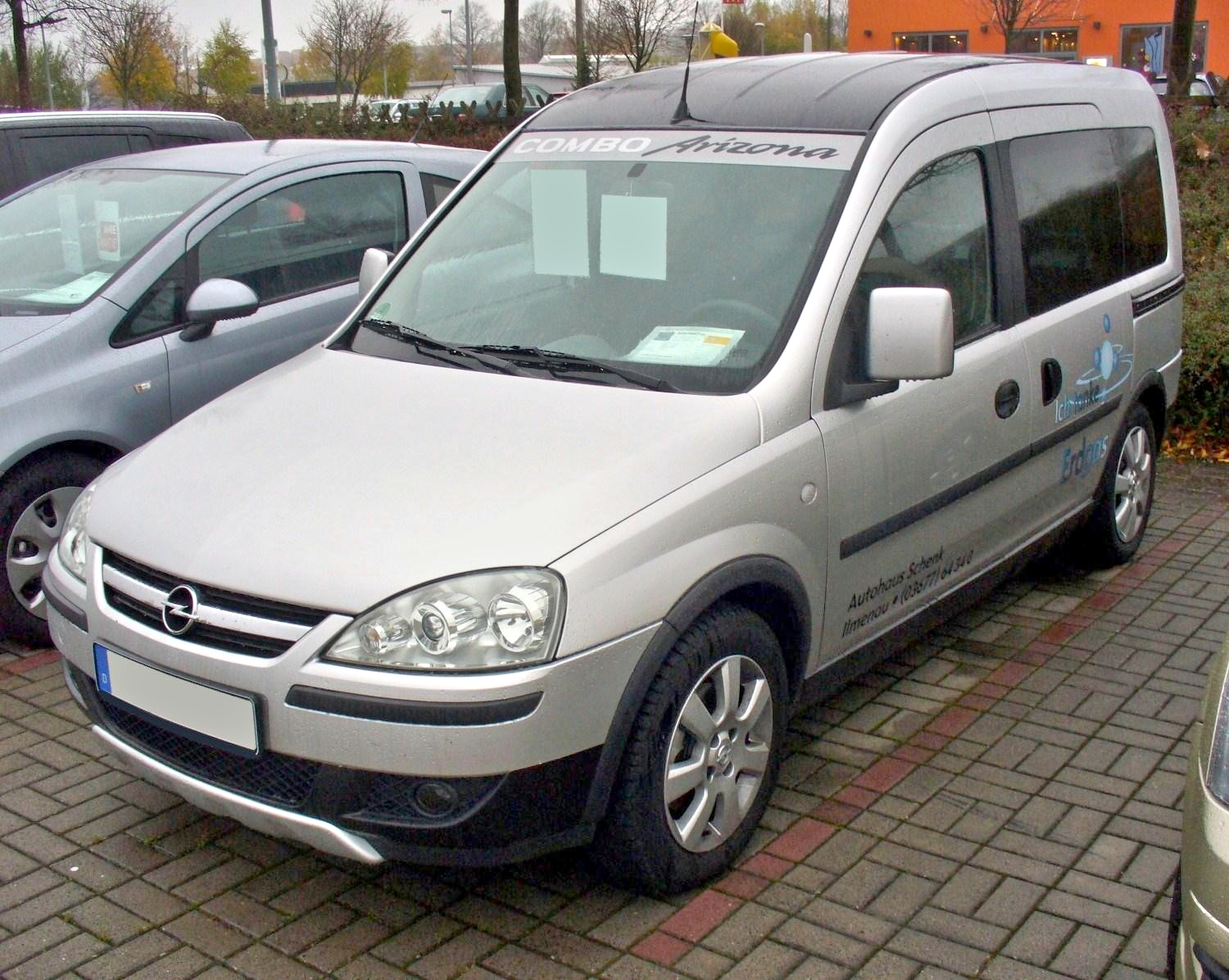
Opel Combo C Arizona

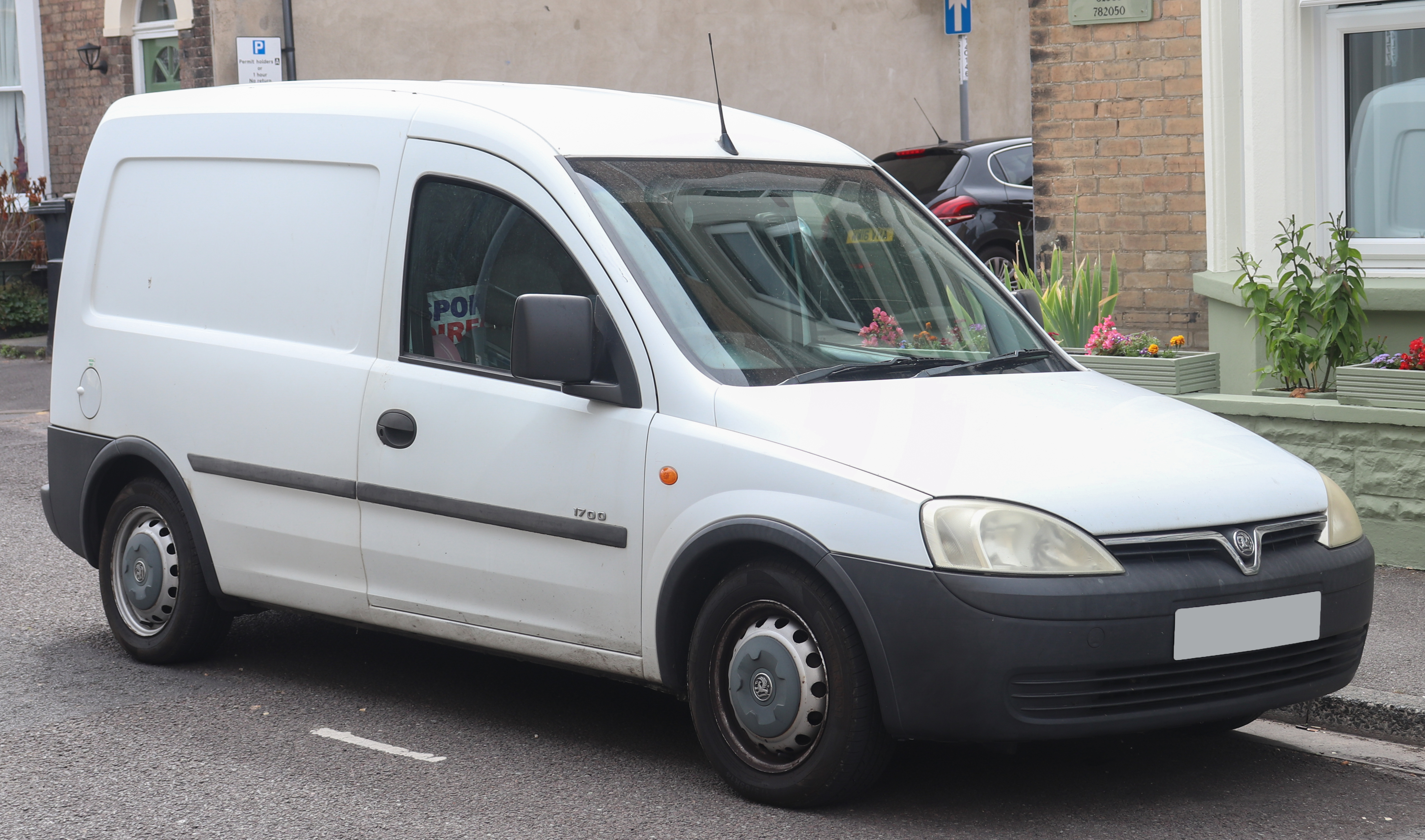
Vauxhall Combo (United Kingdom)

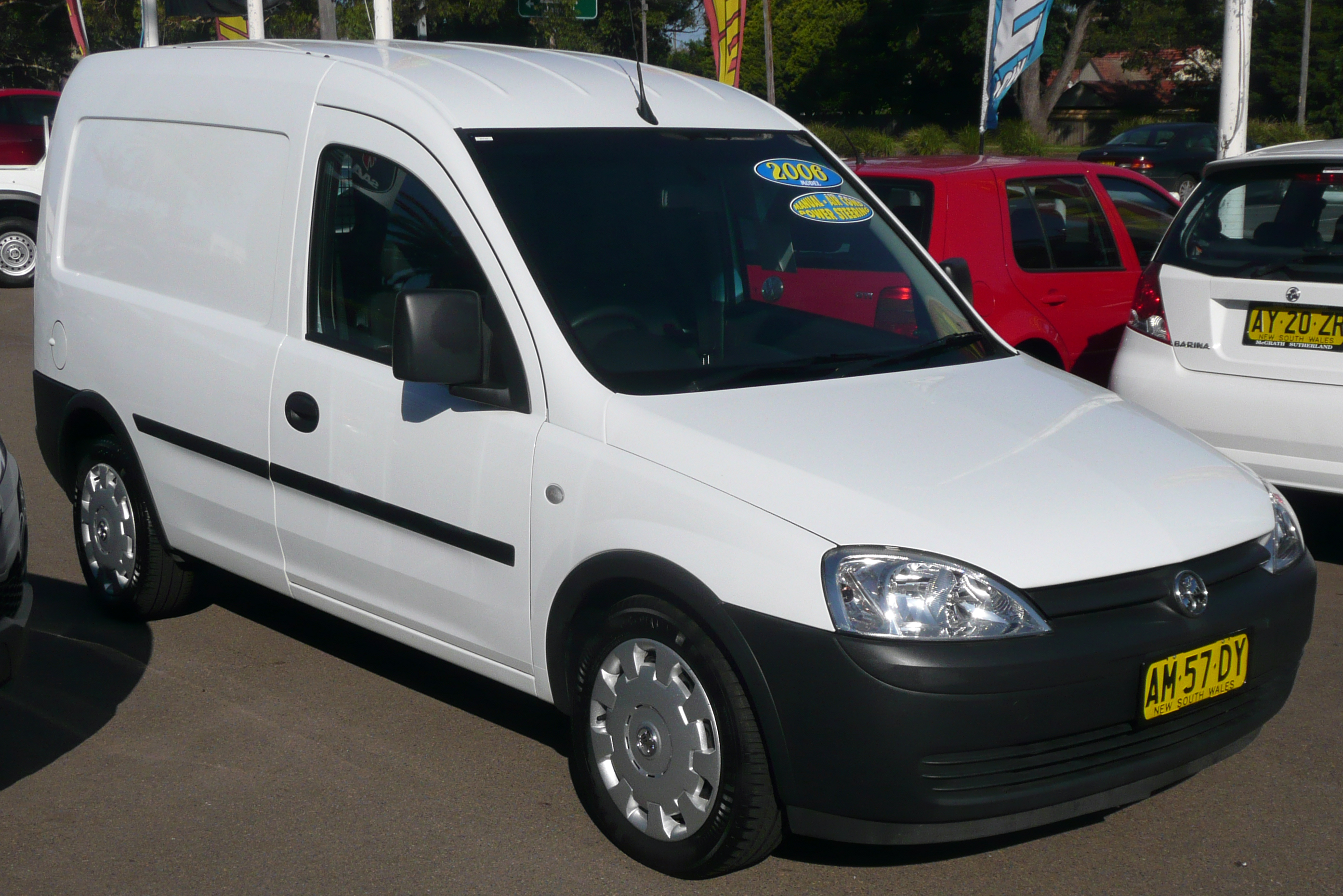
Holden Combo (XC) van (Australia & New Zealand)

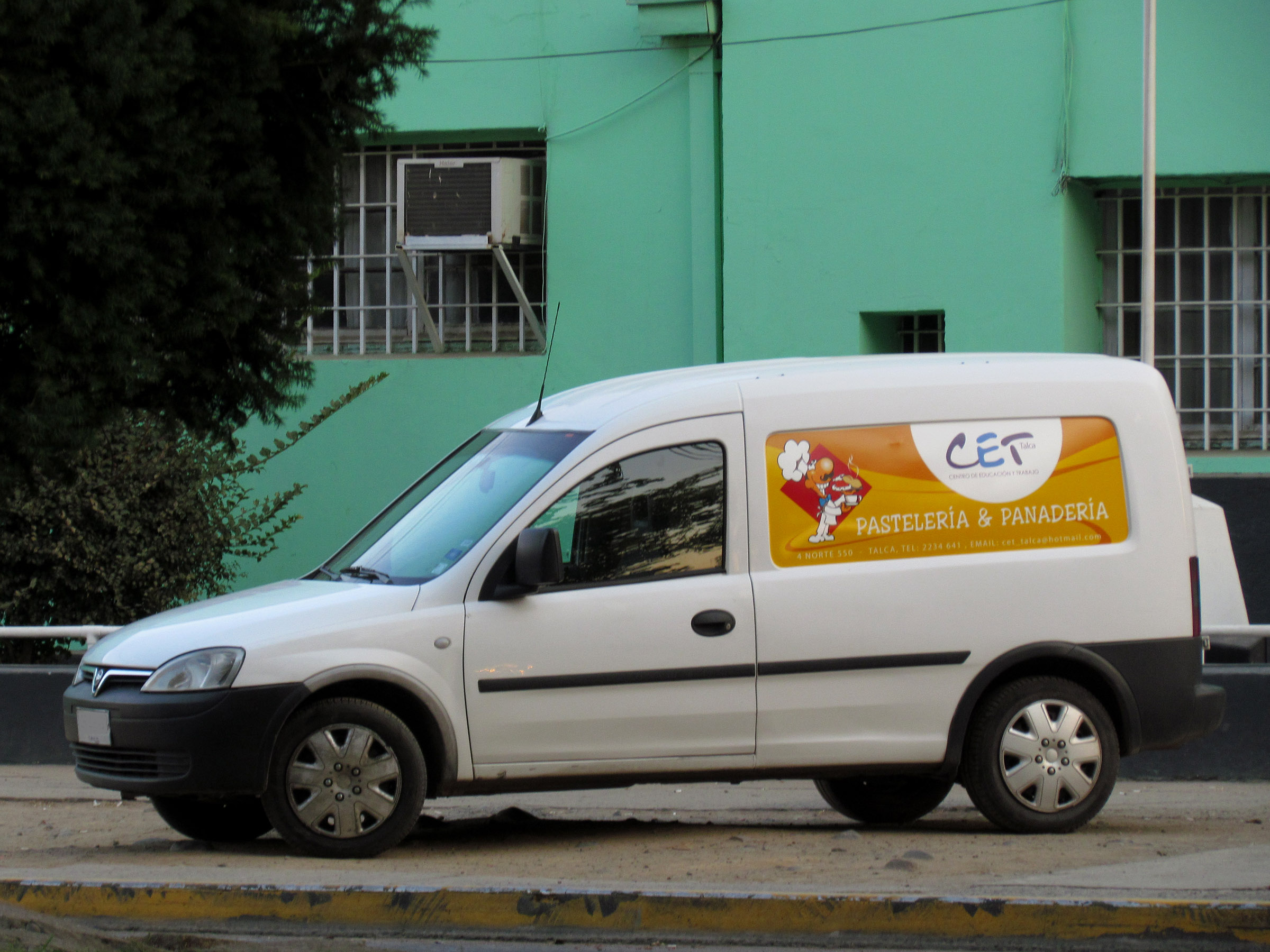
Chevrolet Combo (Chile)

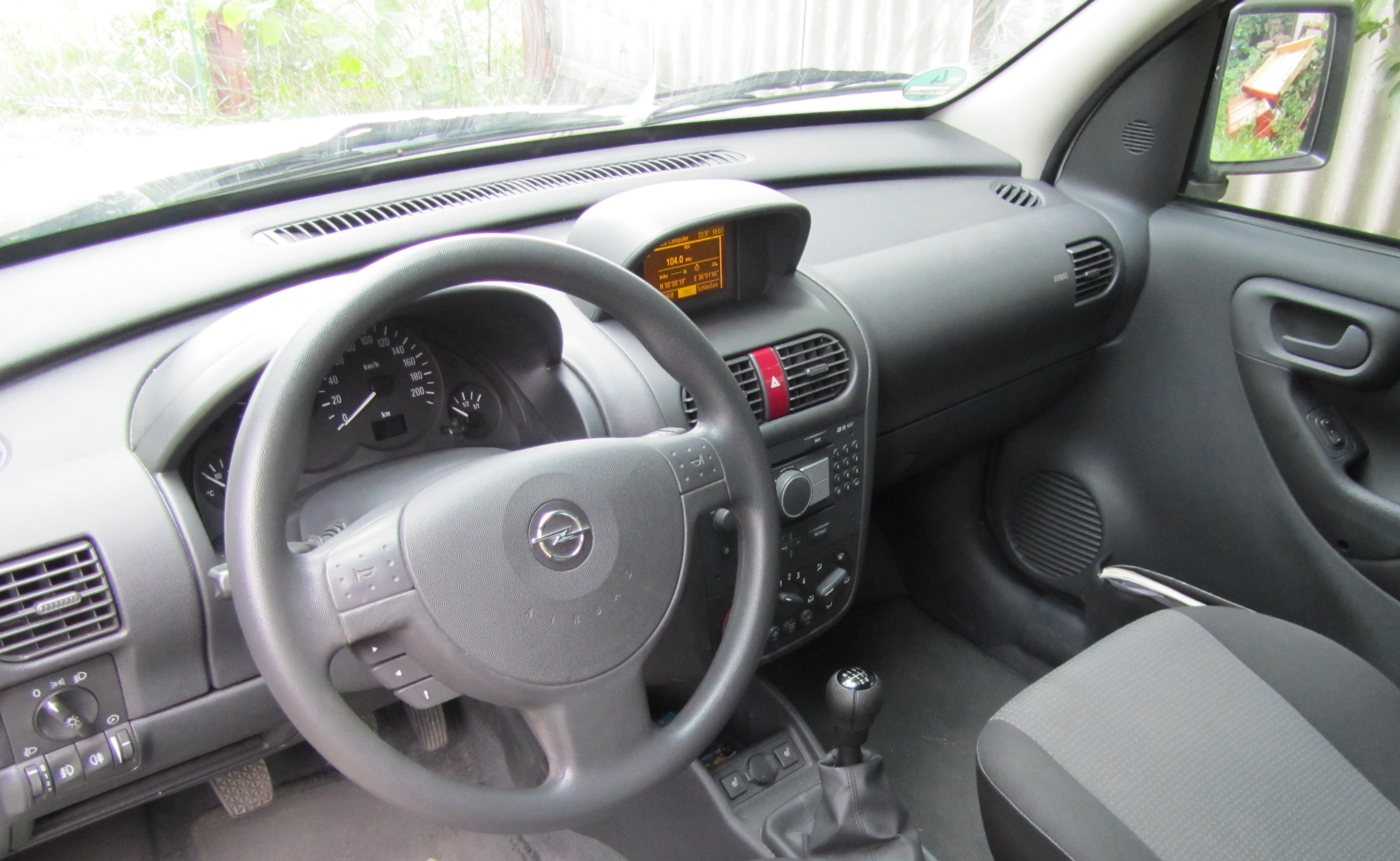
Interior

=== Names and markets ===
- Opel Combo – Europe (except for United Kingdom), South Africa and Singapore
- Vauxhall Combo – United Kingdom
- Holden Combo – Australia, New Zealand
- Chevrolet Combo – Chile

=== Engines ===
	1.4 Twinport ecoFLEX	1.6	1.6 CNG ecoFLEX	1.3 CDTI	1.3 CDTI ecoFLEX	1.7 DI	1.7 DTI	1.7 CDTI
engine type	Petrol I4		CNG I4	Diesel I4				
displacement	1364 cm^{3}	1598 cm^{3}		1248 cm^{3}		1686 cm^{3}		
max. power at rpm	66 kW (90 PS; 89 hp); 5600	64 kW (87 PS; 86 hp); 5400	69 kW (94 PS; 93 hp); 6200	51 kW (69 PS; 68 hp); 4000	55 kW (75 PS; 74 hp); 4000	48 kW (65 PS; 64 hp); 4400	55 kW (75 PS; 74 hp); 4400	74 kW (101 PS; 99 hp); 4400
max. torque at rpm	125 Nm/ 4000	138 Nm/ 3000	133 Nm/ 4200	170 Nm/ 1750–2500	170 Nm/ 1750–2500	130 Nm/ 2000-3000	165 Nm/ 1800–3000	240 Nm/ 2300
max. speed	164 km/h	164 km/h	166 km/h	150 km/h	152 km/h	147 km/h	155 km/h	170 km/h
CO_{2} emission combined in g/km	151	188	133	138	134	146	146	140

== Combo D (2012–2018) ==
Combo D
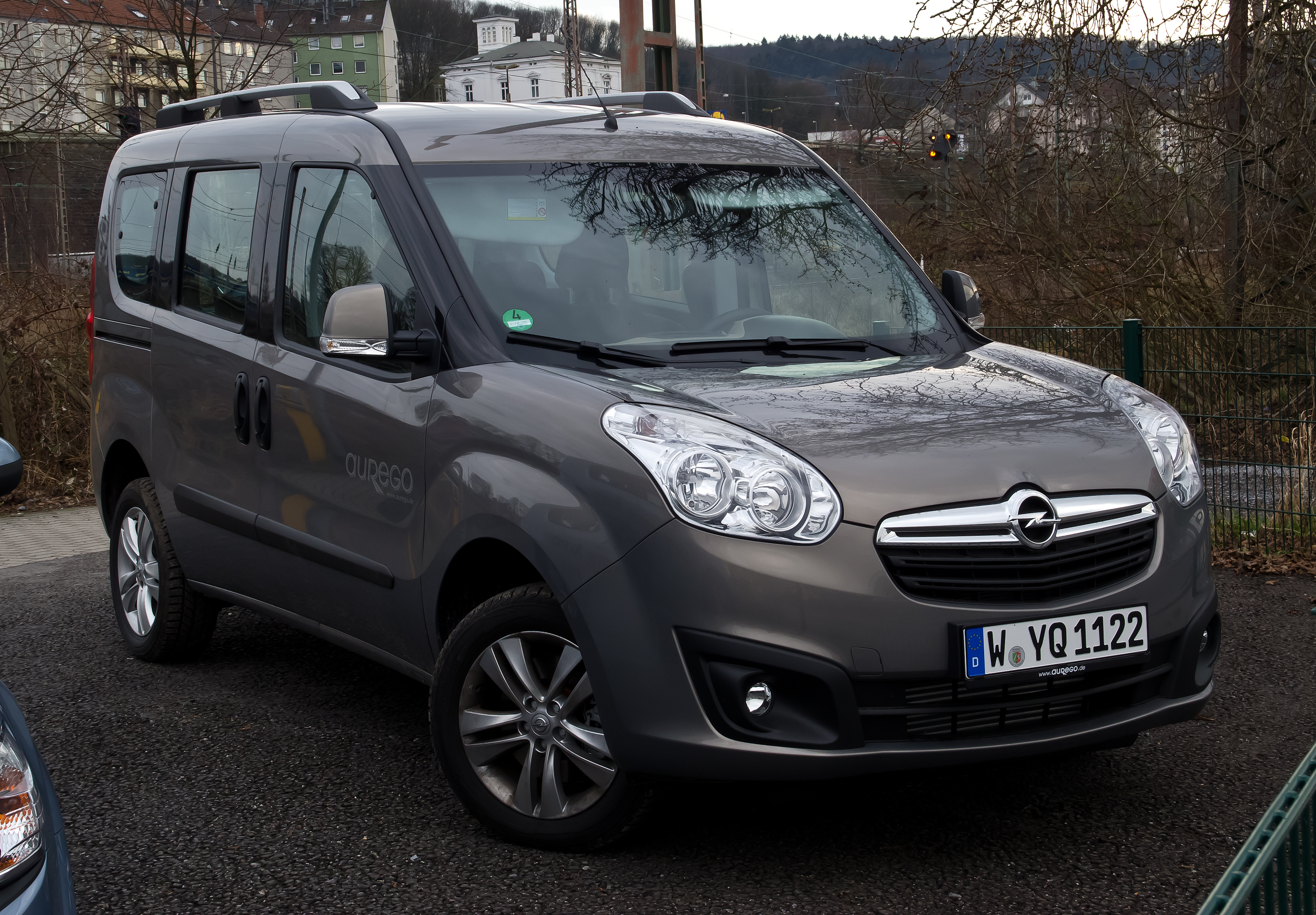

Overview
- Also called: Fiat Doblò; Vauxhall Combo; Ram ProMaster City
- Production: January 2012 – December 2018
- Assembly: Turkey: Bursa (Tofaş)

Body and chassis
- Class: Panel van/Leisure activity vehicle
- Body style: 4/5-door panel van 5-door LAV
- Platform: SCCS platform
- Related: Fiat Linea; Fiat 500L; Opel Meriva B

Powertrain
- Engine: 1.4 L Fire I4 (petrol); 1.4 L Fire Turbojet I4 (CNG); 1.6 L CDTI I4 (diesel)
- Transmission: 5-speed manual 6-speed manual 5-speed automatic

Dimensions
- Wheelbase: SWB: 2,755 mm (108.5 in); LWB: 3,105 mm (122.2 in)
- Length: SWB: 4,390 mm (172.8 in); LWB: 4,740 mm (186.6 in)
- Width: SWB: 1,832 mm (72.1 in); LWB: 1,832 mm (72.1 in)
- Height: SWB: 1,845 mm (72.6 in); LWB: 1,880 mm (74.0 in)

The third generation Combo was manufactured from January 2012 to December 2018, and was based on the Fiat Doblò. The third generation Combo was manufactured in Turkey by Tofaş. Sales began in January 2012.

=== Gallery ===
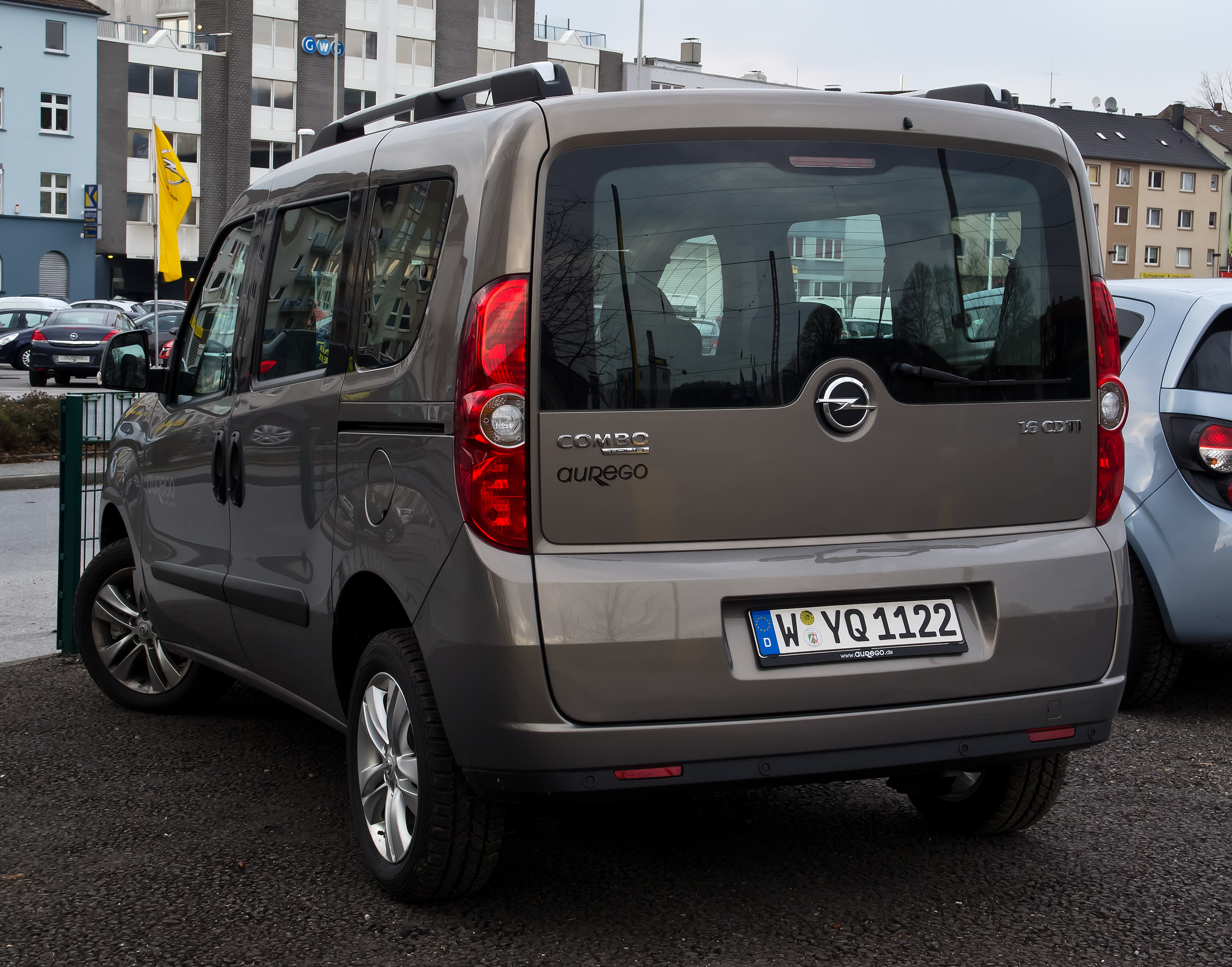
Opel Combo D

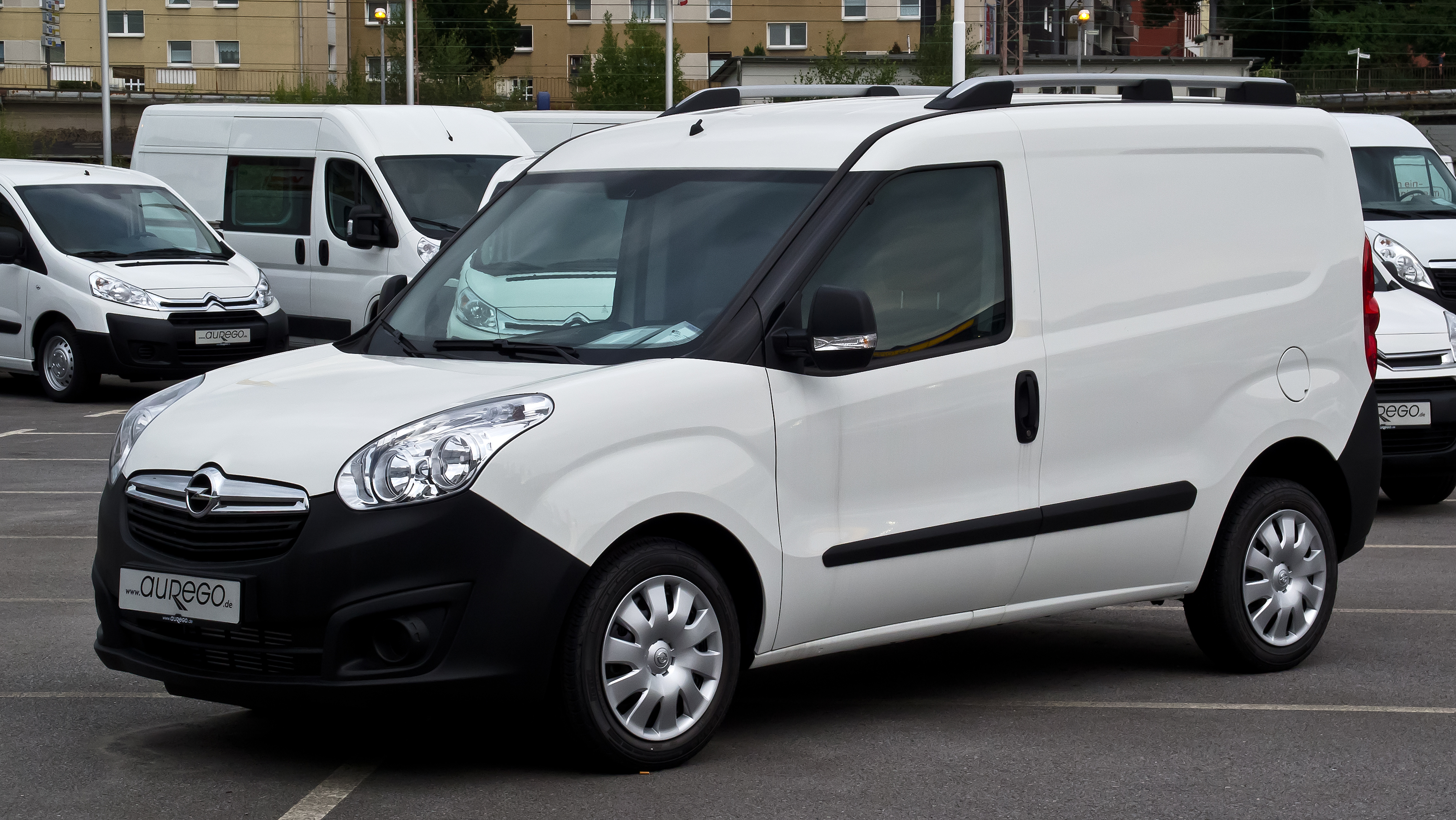
Opel Combo D

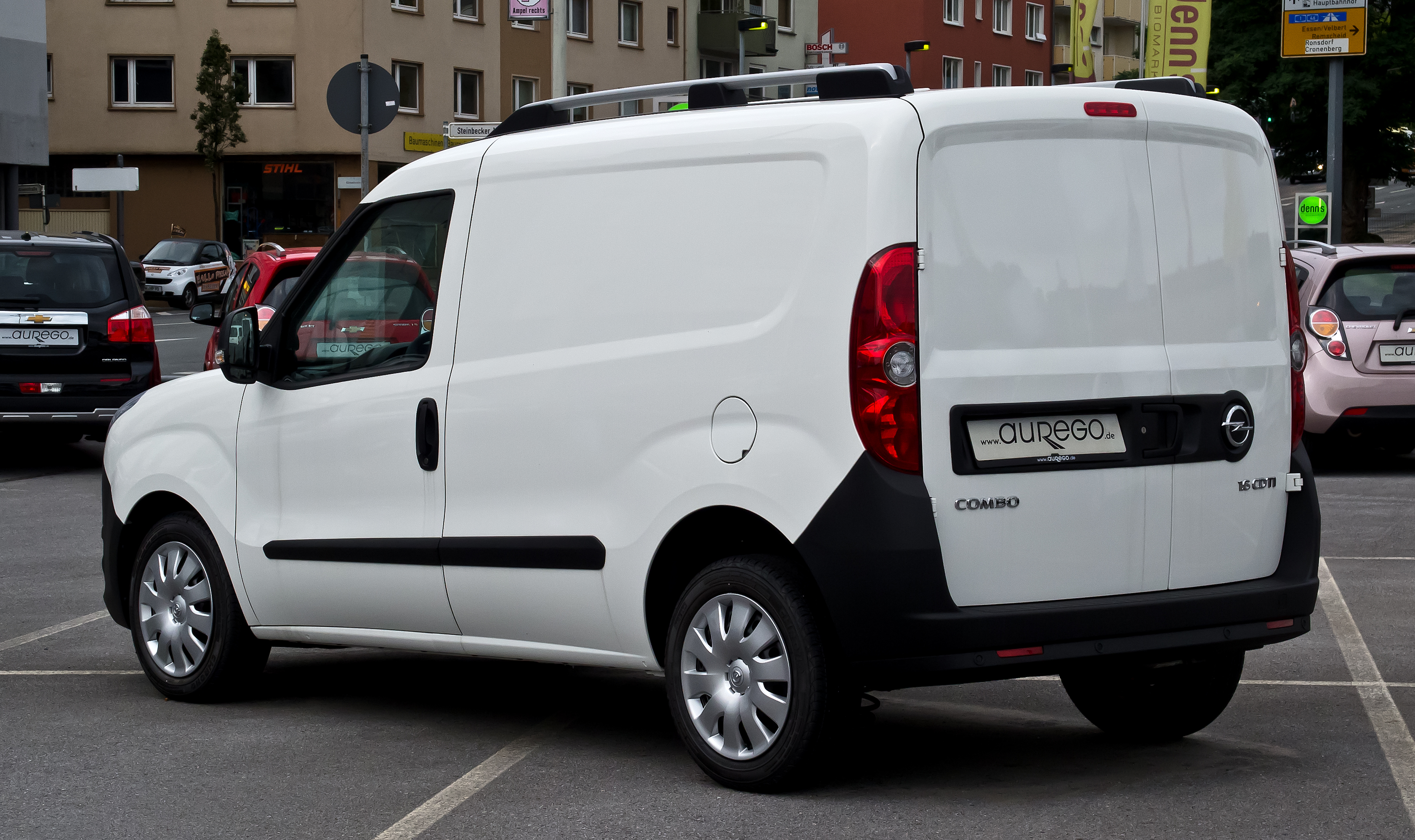
Opel Combo D

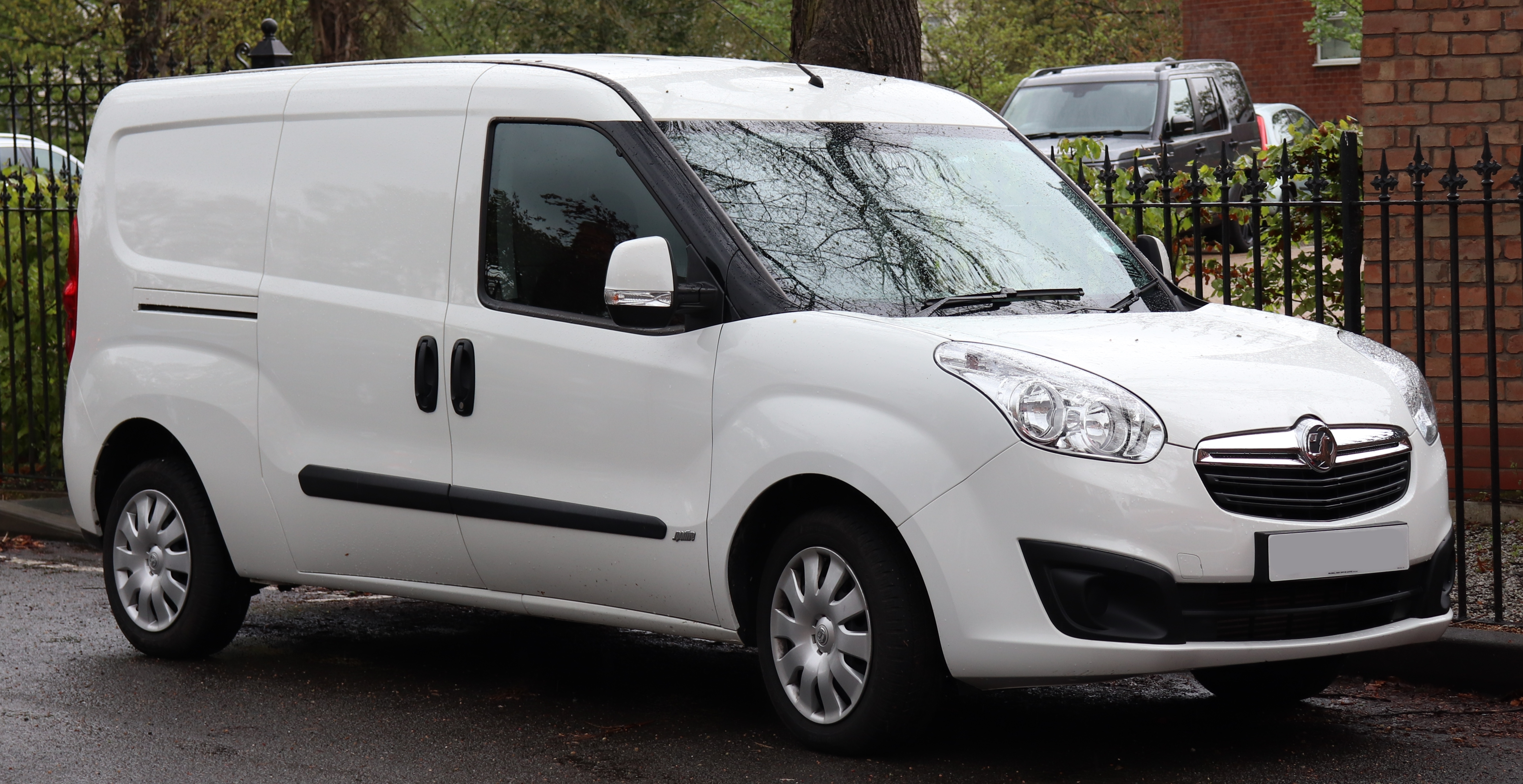
Vauxhall Combo Mk 3

=== Engines ===
	1.4	1.4 Turbo	1.4 CNG Turbo ecoFLEX	1.3 CDTI		1.6 CDTI		1.6 CDTI				2.0 CDTI
engine type	Petrol I4		CNG I4	Diesel I4								
displacement	1368 cm^{3}			1248 cm^{3}		1598 cm^{3}						1956 cm^{3}
max. power at rpm	70 kW (95 PS; 94 hp); 6000	88 kW (120 PS; 118 hp); 5000		66 kW (90 PS; 89 hp); 4000	70 kW (95 PS; 94 hp); 4000	66 kW (90 PS; 89 hp); 4000		70 kW (95 PS; 94 hp); 4000	74 kW (100 PS; 99 hp); 3650	77 kW (105 PS; 103 hp); 4000	88 kW (120 PS; 118 hp); 3500	99 kW (135 PS; 133 hp); 3500
max. torque at rpm	127 Nm/ 4500	206 Nm/ 3000	206 Nm/ 3000	200 Nm/ 1500		290 Nm/ 1500		200 Nm/ 1500	300 Nm/ 1750	290 Nm/ 1500	320 Nm/ 1750	320 Nm/ 1500
max. speed	161 km/h	172 km/h		158 km/h	159 km/h (161 km/h)	158 km/h [158 km/h]		158 km/h	164 km/h	160 km/h (164 km/h)	172 km/h (176 km/h)	179 km/h
CO_{2} emission combined in g/km	169–177 (163–171)	169–179	134	136 (129)	136 (123)	145–156 (141–157)	138–148 (133–147)	137 (124)	145–156 (138–148)	134–158 (120–133)	136–149 (124–140)	156–163 (150–157)

== Combo E (K9; 2018) ==
Combo E
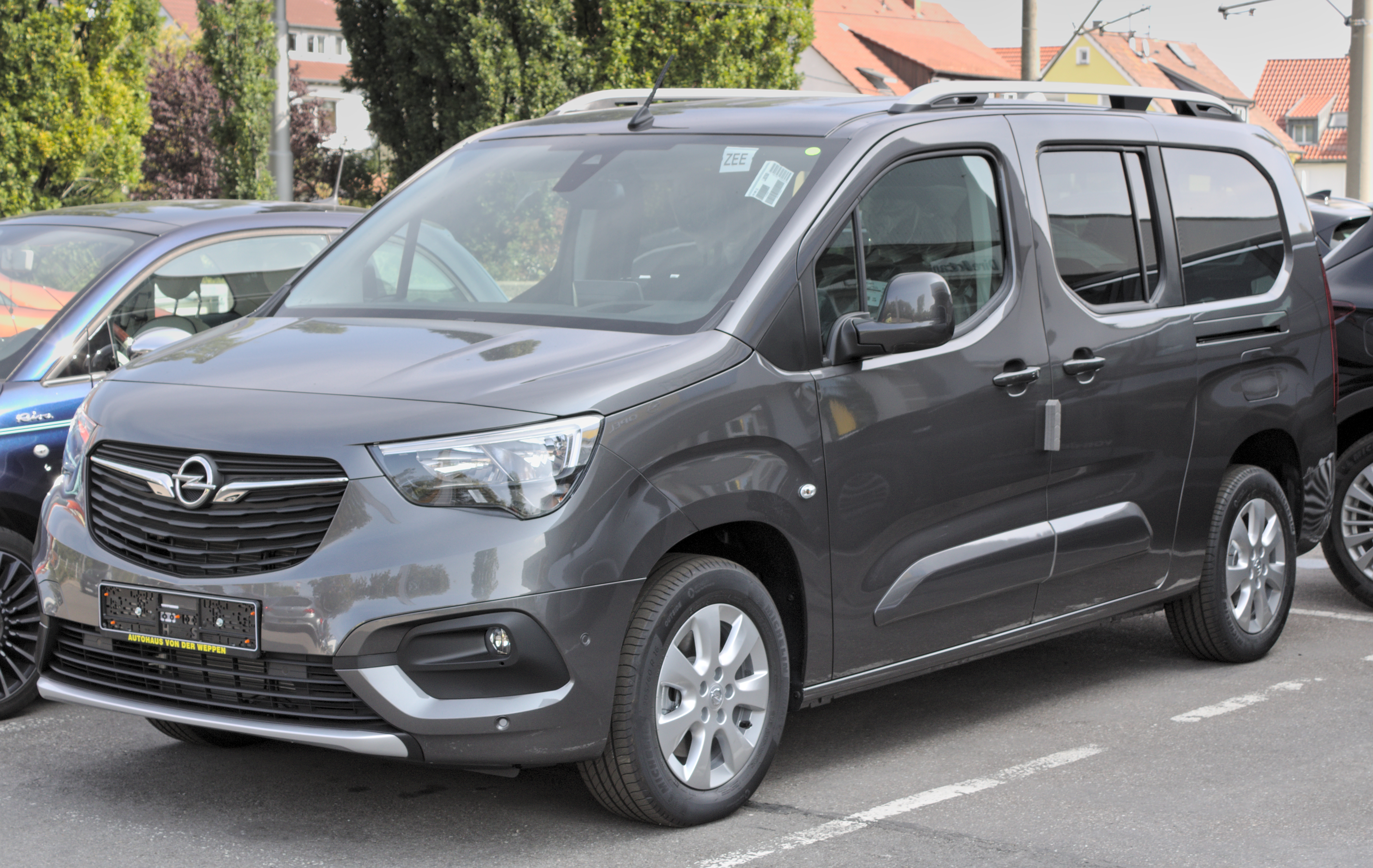
- Opel Combo Life

Overview
- Also called: Peugeot Rifter; Citroën Berlingo; Peugeot Partner; Toyota ProAce City; Vauxhall Combo/Combo Life; Fiat Doblò
- Production: 2018–present
- Assembly: Portugal: Mangualde (PSA Mangualde Plant); Spain: Vigo (PSA Vigo Plant); United Kingdom: Ellesmere Port (Vauxhall Ellesmere Port)

Body and chassis
- Class: Leisure activity vehicle (M)
- Body style: 4/5-door panel van 5-door LAV
- Platform: PSA EMP2 platform

Powertrain
- Engine: 1.2 L THP I4 (petrol); 1.5 L CDTI I4 (diesel); 1.6 L CDTI I4 (diesel)
- Transmission: 5&6-speed manual EAT8 Automatic

Dimensions
- Wheelbase: 2,780–2,970 mm (109.4–116.9 in)
- Length: 4,400–4,750 mm (173.2–187.0 in)

The fourth generation Combo was unveiled at the 2018 Geneva Motor Show. It is a sister model to the Citroën Berlingo and Peugeot Rifter and Partner, as Groupe PSA bought Opel in March 2017. It is built in the Stellantis plant in Mangualde, Portugal, and in the Stellantis plant in Vigo, Spain, alongside the new Peugeot Rifter and Citroën Berlingo.

=== Gallery ===
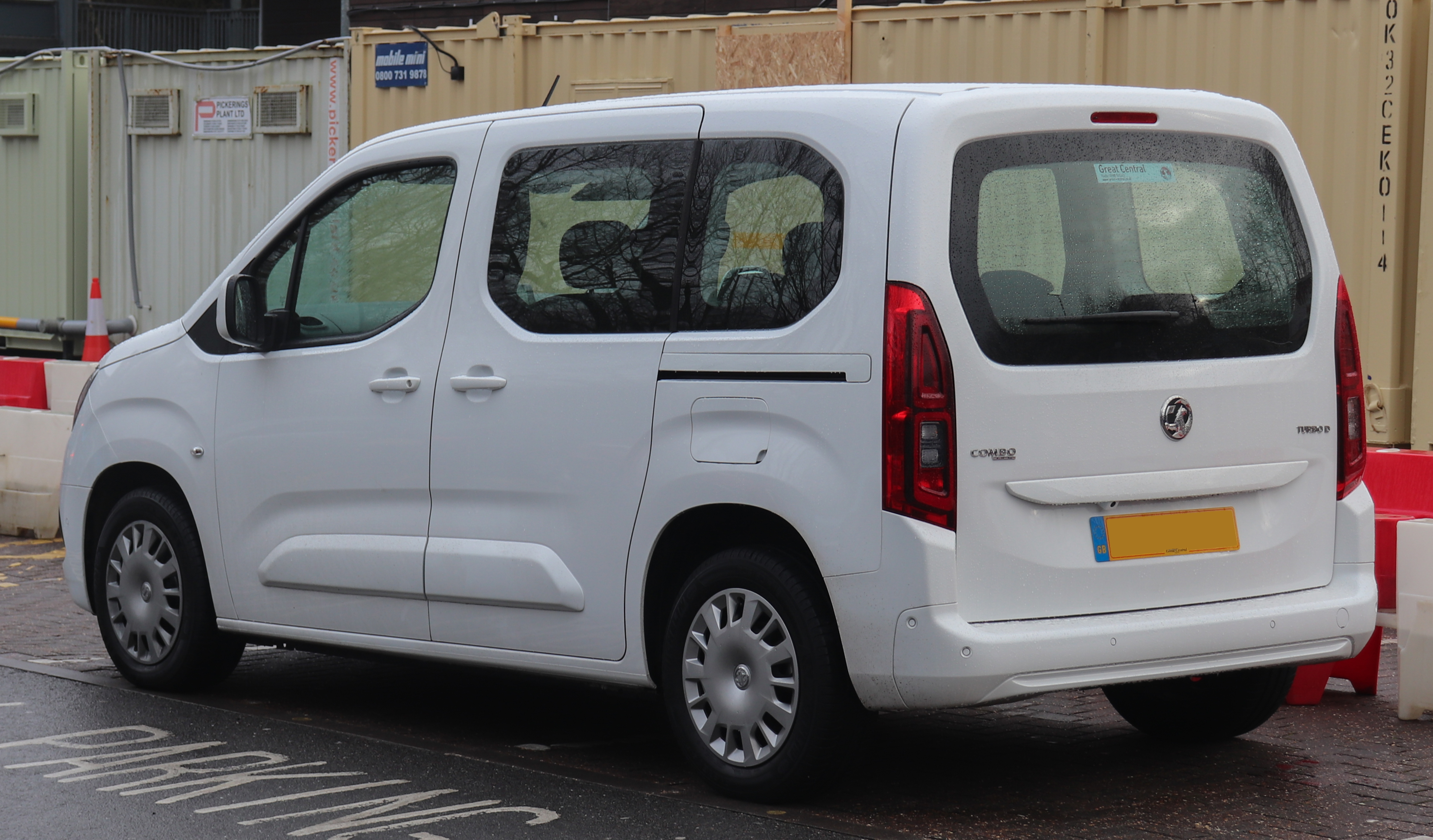
Rear (pre-facelift)

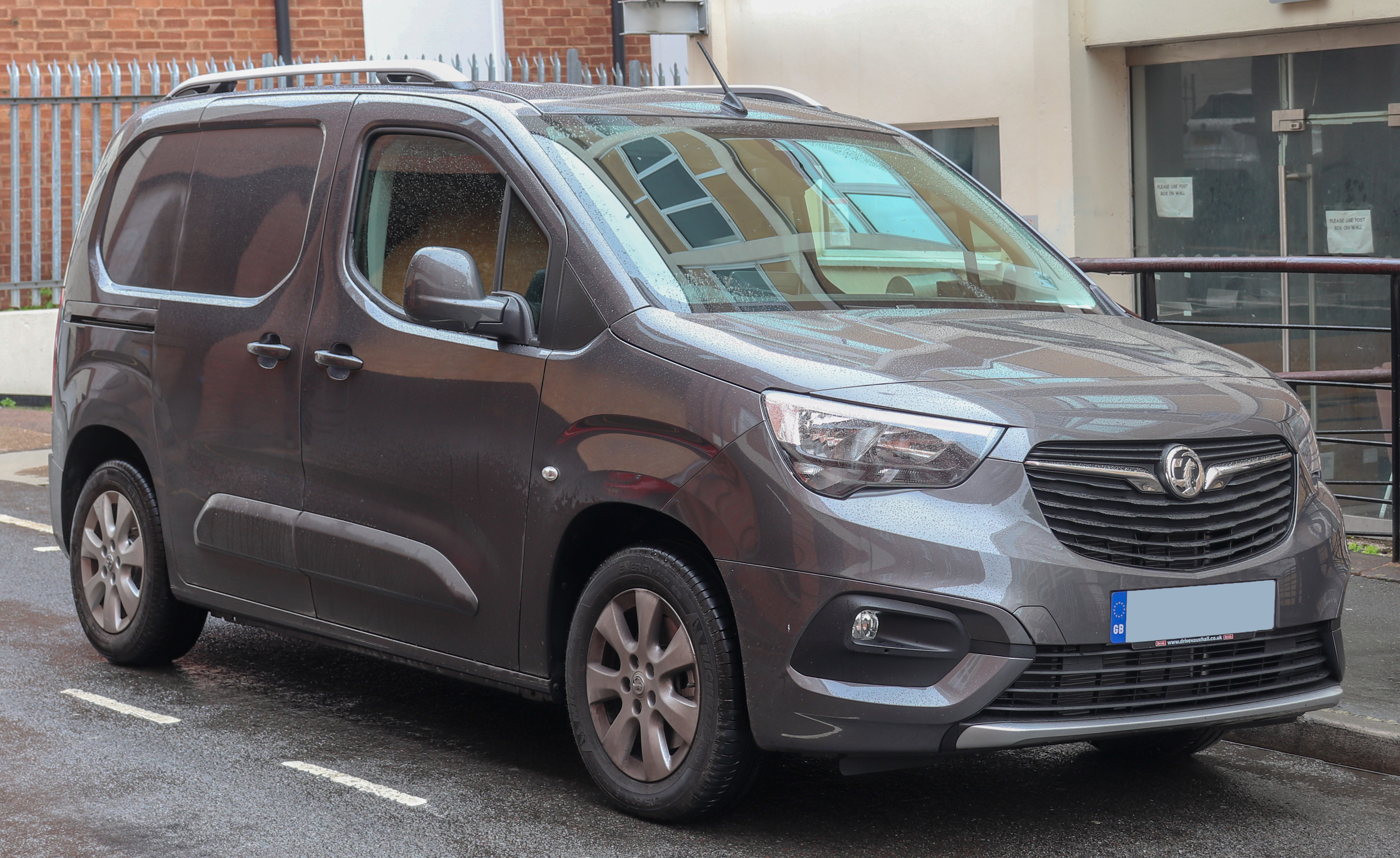
Vauxhall Combo Van

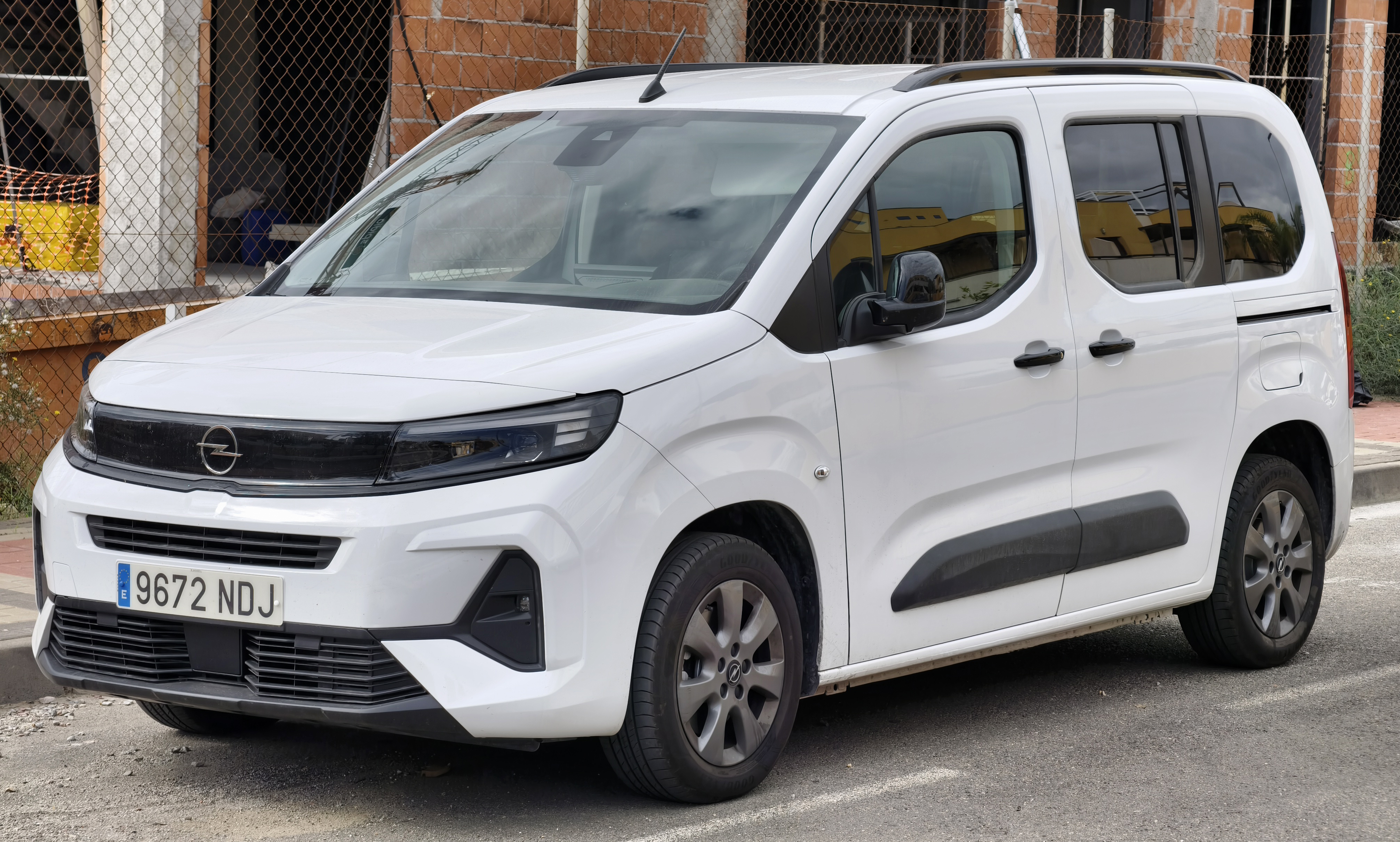
Opel Combo Life (Facelift)

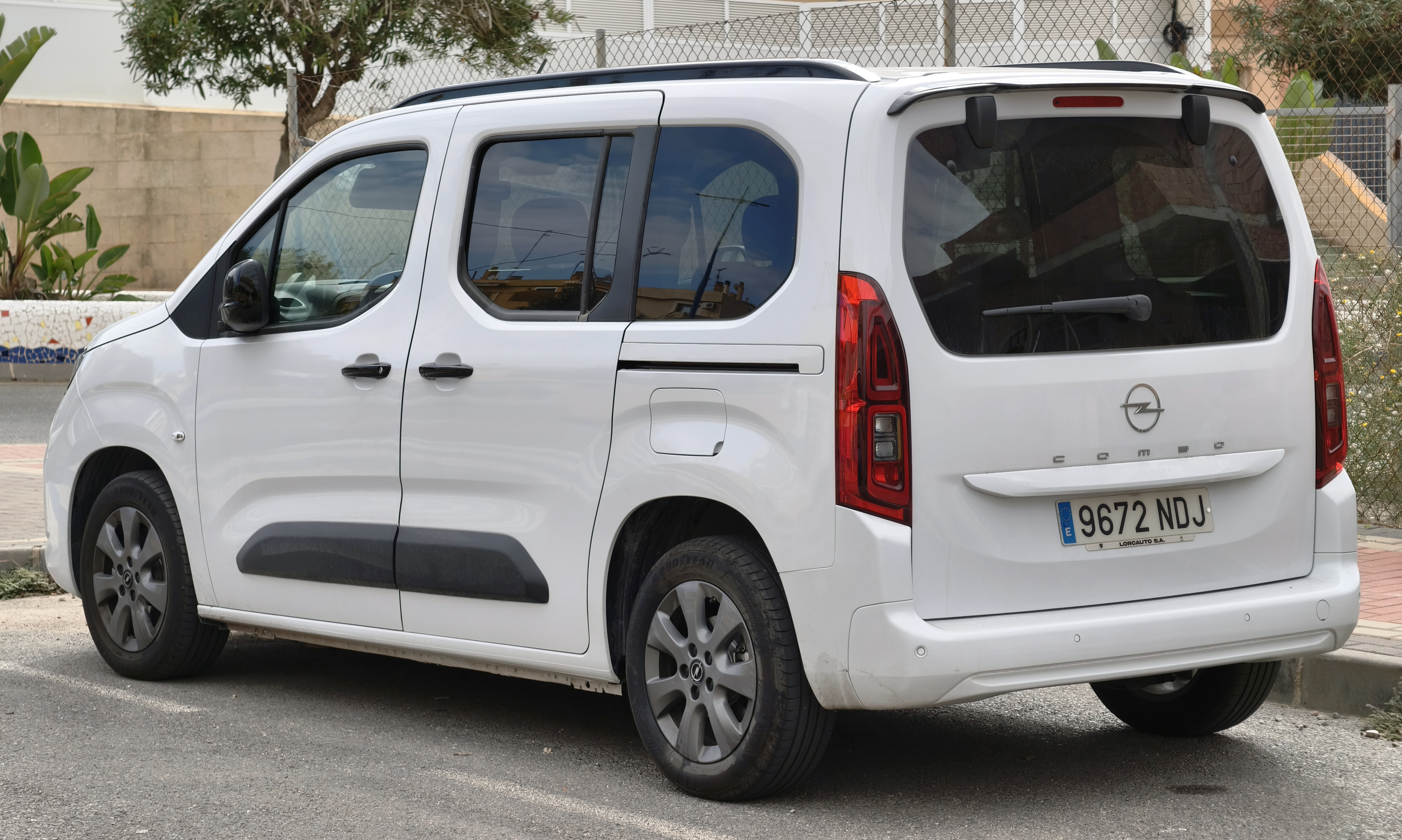
Opel Combo Life (Facelift)

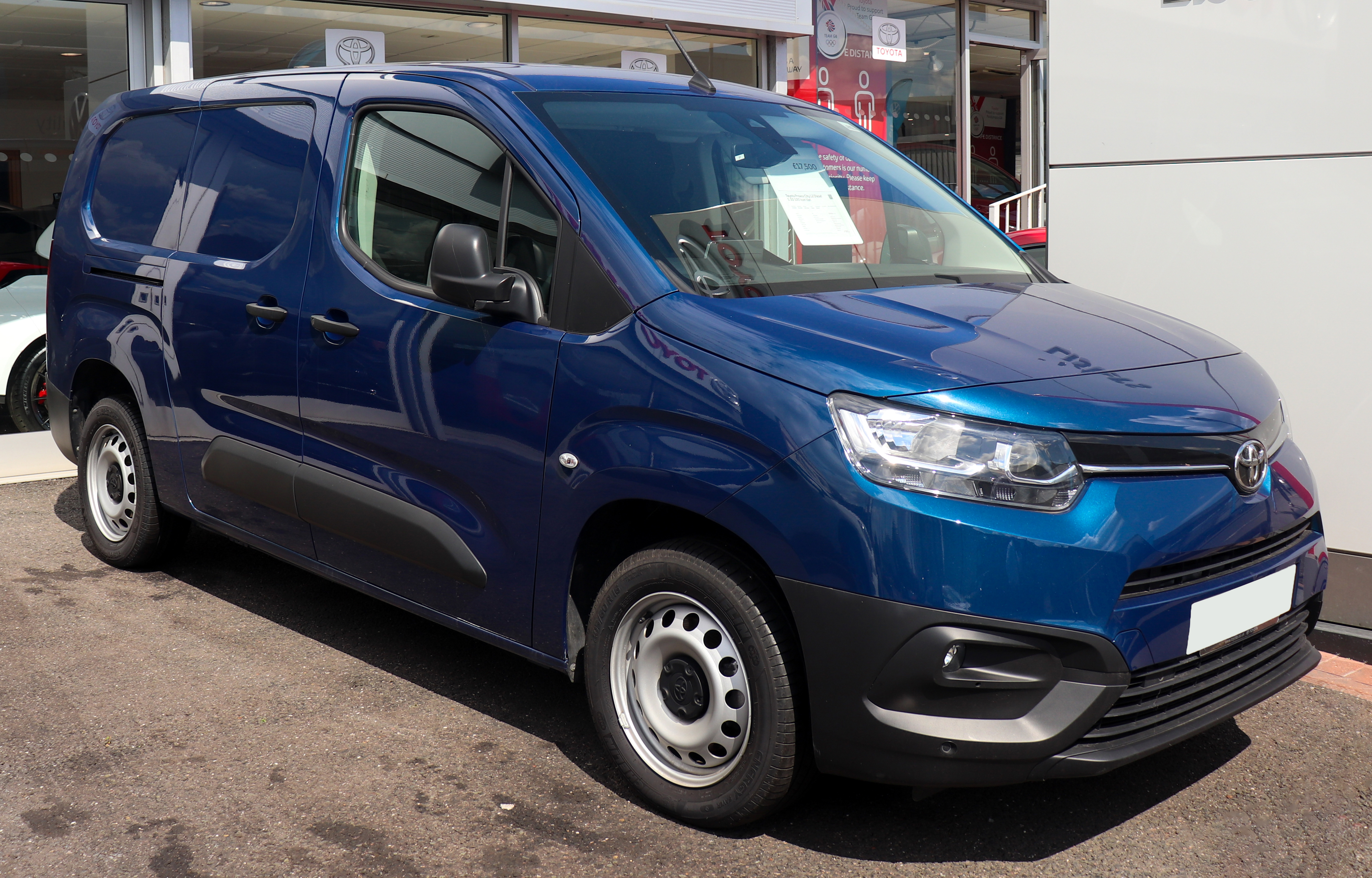
Toyota ProAce City

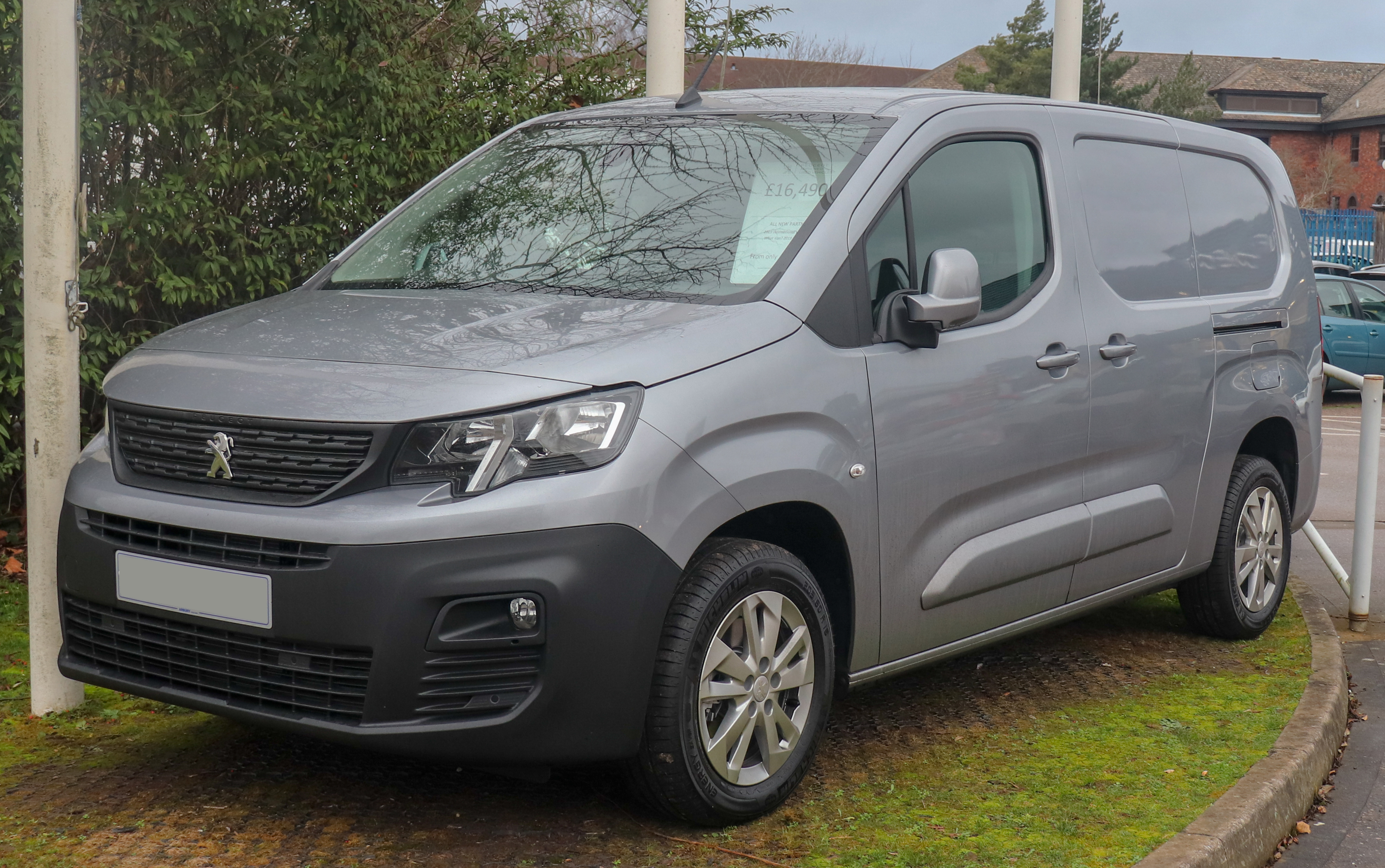
Peugeot Partner

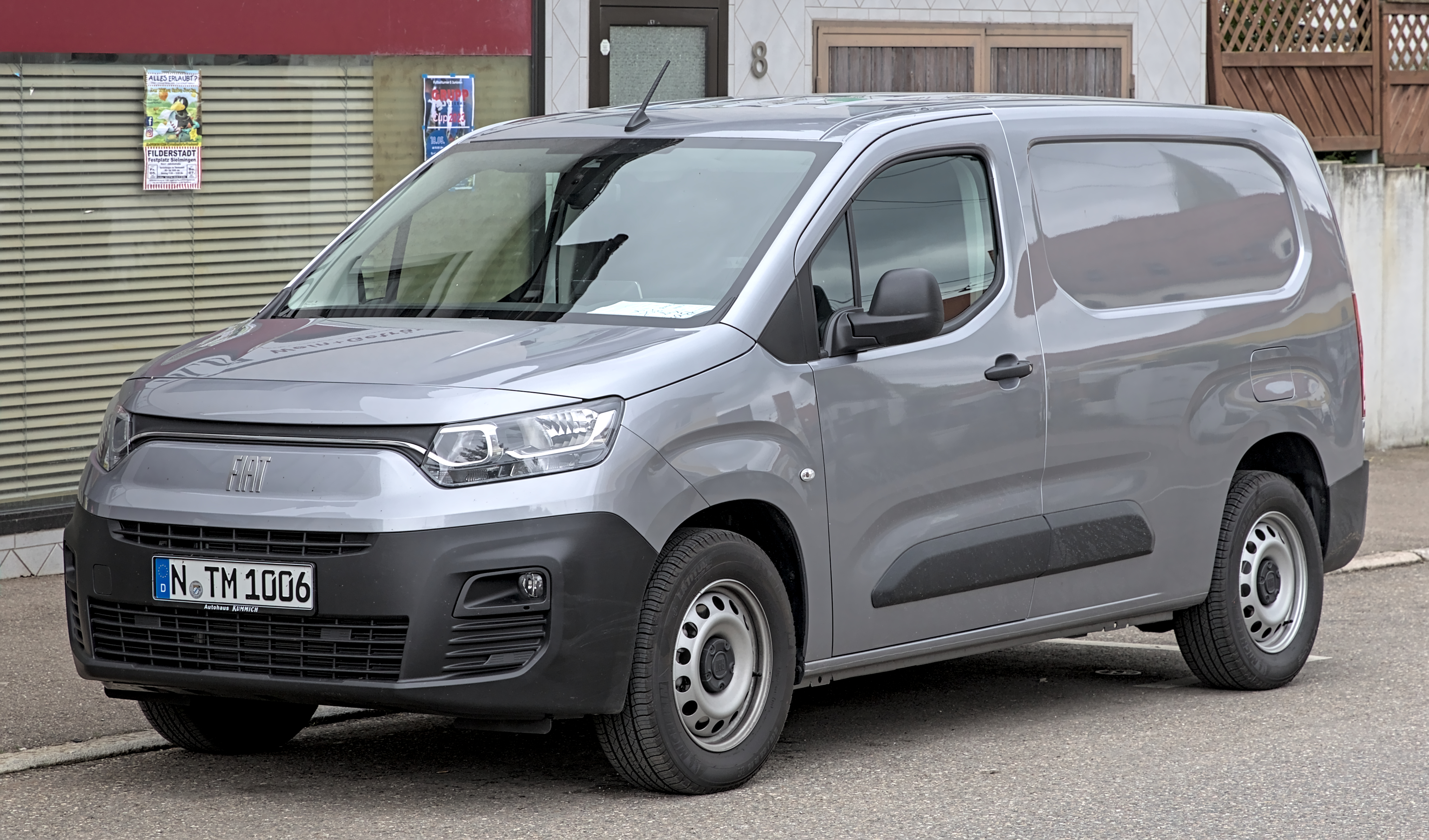
Fiat Doblò

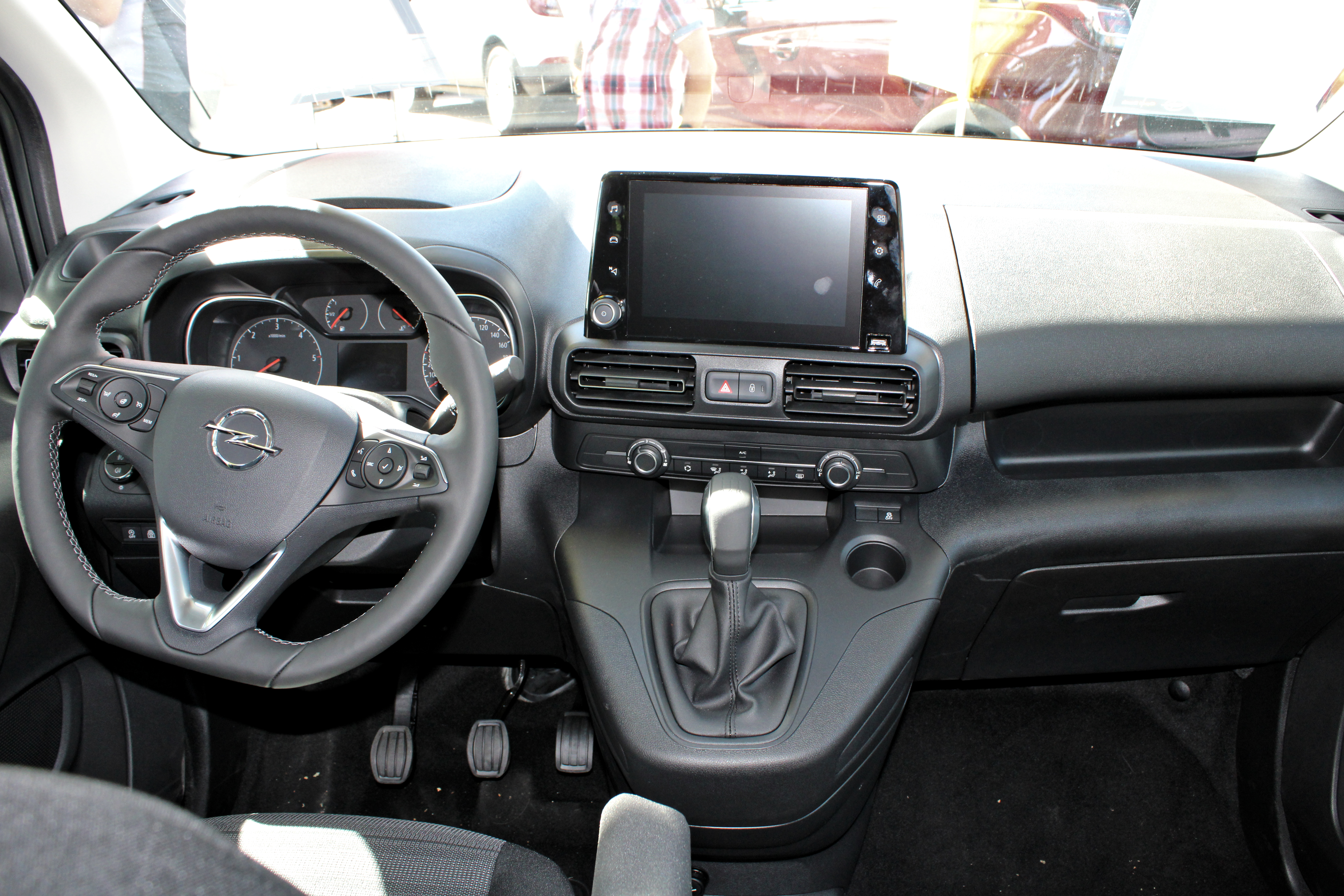
Interior
