= Azambuja =

- Municipality
- Town of Azambuja
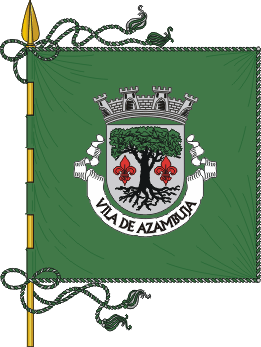
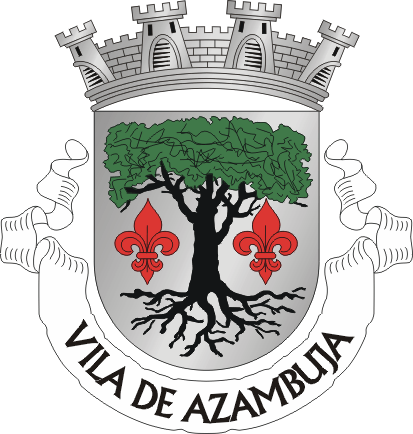
- Flag Coat of arms
- Interactive map of Azambuja
- Location in Portugal
- Coordinates: 39°04′N 8°52′W
- Country: Portugal
- Region: Oeste e Vale do Tejo
- Intermunic. comm.: Lezíria do Tejo
- District: Lisbon
- Parishes: 7

Government
  - President: Silvino Lúcio (PS)

Area
  - Total: 262.66 km^{2} (101.41 sq mi)

Population (2011)
  - Total: 21,814
  - Density: 83.050/km^{2} (215.10/sq mi)
- Time zone: UTC+00:00 (WET)
  - Summer (DST): UTC+01:00 (WEST)
- Local holiday: Ascension Day (date varies)
- Website: http://www.cm-azambuja.pt

Azambuja (Portuguese pronunciation: [ɐzɐ̃ˈbuʒɐ]), officially the Town of Azambuja (Portuguese: Vila de Azambuja), is a municipality in the Portuguese district of Lisbon, in the historical region of Ribatejo (and the sole municipality of within the district that does not belong to the historical province of Estremadura). The population in 2011 was 21,814, in an area of 262.66 km^{2}. Until 2004, the municipality was part of the Lisbon Metropolitan Area, when they left the metropolitan area and joined into the NUTS III statistical subregion of Lezíria do Tejo.

== History ==
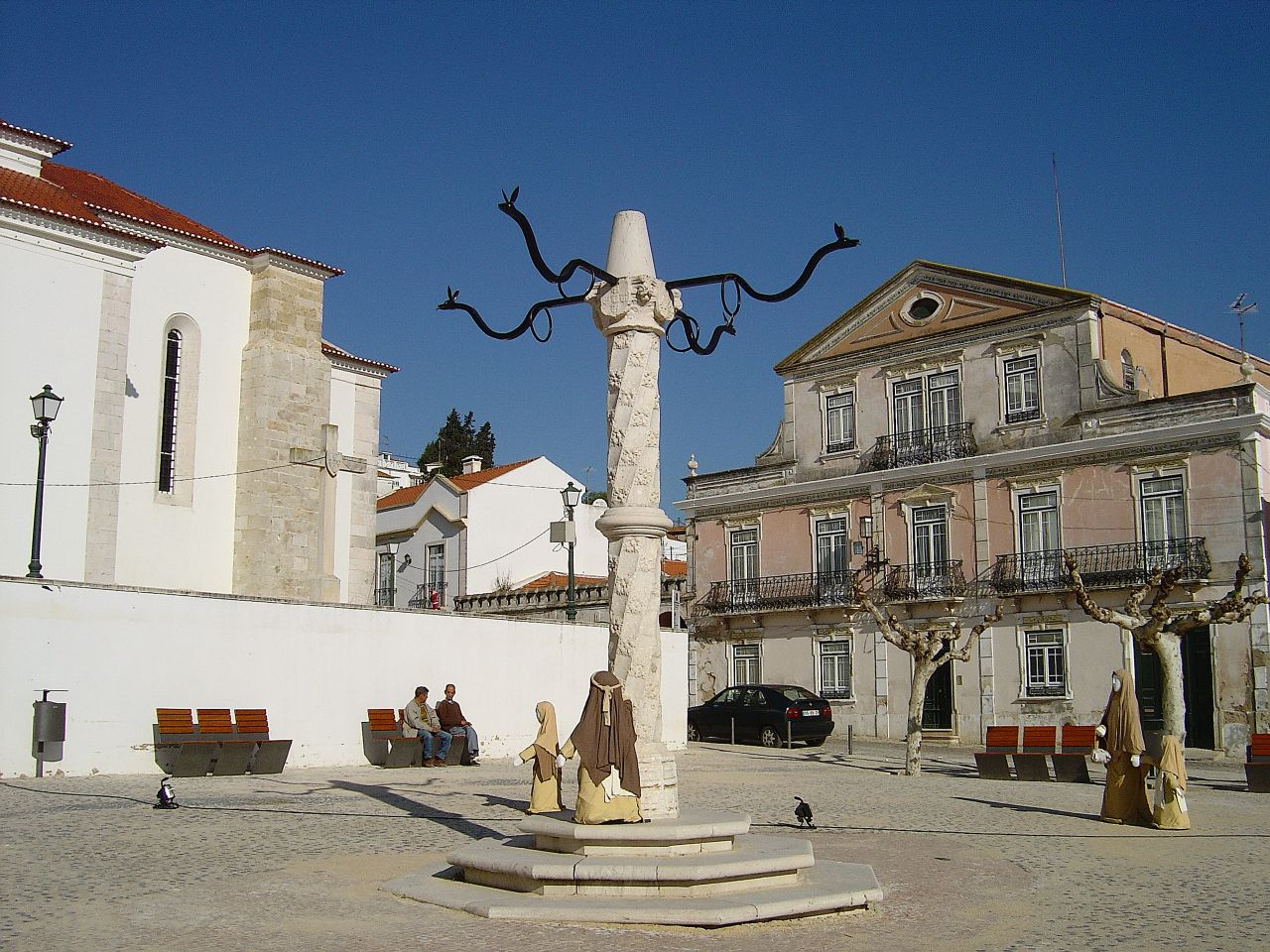
Centre of Azambuja.

The town is so old that there is no longer any surviving record of when it received the privileged status embodied in a municipal charter. The town's current name is derived from the name given to it by Muslims of Iberia, who referred to it as "Azzabuja".

In 1963 Ford opened a vehicle assembly plant in Azambuja. In 2000 the plant was integrated into the nearby vehicle assembly business of General Motors (Opel). Opel Combo vans were assembled until the end of 2006 when the plant was closed and production transferred to the manufacturer's plant at Figueruelas near Zaragoza, Spain.

== Geography ==
The municipality is limited to the north by Rio Maior, to the northeast Santarém, to the east Cartaxo, to the southeast Salvaterra de Magos, to the south Benavente and Vila Franca de Xira and to the west by Alenquer and Cadaval.

Its seat is the town (vila) with the same name, which has 6,900 inhabitants and occupies the parish (freguesia) also named Azambuja. The total number of parishes is 7.

== Demographics ==
Population in Azambuja Municipality (1801–2011)
1801	1849	1900	1930	1960	1981	1991	2001	2011
3402	3514	11446	14035	18218	19768	19568	20837	21814

== Parishes ==
Administratively, the municipality is divided into 7 civil parishes (freguesias):

- Alcoentre
- Aveiras de Baixo
- Aveiras de Cima
- Azambuja
- Manique do Intendente
- Vale do Paraíso
- Vila Nova da Rainha

== Notable people ==
- Giovanni Lopez de Andrade (1569 in Azambuja – 1628) a Roman Catholic prelate who served as Archbishop of Otranto 1623 to 1628
- Jose de Sousa (born 1974 in Azambuja) professional darts player.
- Gia Rodrigues (born in 2003) Supermodel and runner up to Miss Portugal contest in 2021
