= Ana Silva =

Ana Silva may refer to:

- Ana da Silva, Portuguese singer
- Ana Carolina da Silva (born 1991), Brazilian volleyball player (part of the national team since 2014)
- Ana Beatriz Silva Correia (born 1992), Brazilian volleyball player (part of the national team 2010)
- Ana Cláudia da Silva Ramos (born 1961), Brazilian volleyball player (part of the national team 1986–1989)
- Ana Claudia Lemos Silva (born 1988), Brazilian track and field athlete
- Ana Cláudia Silva (athlete) (born 1987), Brazilian para-athlete
- Ana Cláudia Silva (gymnast) (born 1992), Brazilian artistic gymnast
- Ana Cristina Silva, Portuguese psychologist and novelist

== See also ==
- Ana da Silva, founding member of The Raincoats
