= União Atlético Povoense =

Portuguese football club

UA Povoense
- Full name: União Atlético Povoense
- Short name: Povoense
- Founded: 1 May 1942; 83 years ago
- Ground: Complexo Desportivo da Quinta da Piedade
- Capacity: 350
- President: António Fonseca
- League: AF Lisboa - First Division
- Website: https://uapovoense.emjogo.pt/

União Atlético Povoense is a football club based in Póvoa de Santa Iria, Portugal. They currently compete in the First Division of the Lisbon Football Association.

== History ==
The cultural and recreational collective named União Atlético Povoense was founded on 1 May 1942 by a small group of citizens from Póvoa de Santa Iria, in the municipality of Vila Franca de Xira. The founding ceremony took place at a small warehouse belonging to the company Pereira e Bessa, in the Rua da República in Póvoa de Santa Iria. The club's constitution was approved on 23 May 1942 and published on the Diário do Governo no. 223 on 23 November 1942.

The club's colors since its foundation are yellow and red. Presently, the club also competes in futsal, athletics and swimming.

== Honors ==
- AF Lisboa – Second Division

Winners: 1972–73

- AF Lisboa – Third Division

Winners (3): 1958–59, 1967–68, 1982–83

- AF Lisboa – Cup

Winners: 2014–15
