= 2014 Portugal legionellosis outbreak =

Disease outbreak in Portugal

- Location of the affected district in Portugal
- Disease: Legionellosis
- Pathogen: Legionella
- Location: Lisbon district, mostly in the municipality of Vila Franca de Xira
- Date: 7–21 November 2014
- Confirmed cases: 375
- Deaths: 12

The 2014 Portugal legionellosis outbreak was an outbreak of legionellosis in multiple cities of the Lisbon district in Portugal, caused by the release of Legionella bacteria from the cooling towers of a fertilizer plant in Forte da Casa, Vila Franca de Xira. It began on 7 November 2014 and affected mostly people in Póvoa de Santa Iria, Forte da Casa and Vialonga, in the municipality of Vila Franca de Xira. Paulo Macedo, the Portuguese Health Minister, declared the outbreak extinct on 21 November. The outbreak resulted in 375 cases and 12 casualties.

== Timeline ==
Date	Cases	Fatalities	Source
2014-11-07	33	0	Público
2014-11-08	90	1	Diário de Notícias, Directorate-General of Health (DGS)
2014-11-09	180	4	Diário de Notícias, DGS
2014-11-10	233	5	DGS
2014-11-11	278	5	DGS
2014-11-12	302	7	Público, DGS
2014-11-13	311	7	DGS
2014-11-14	316	7	DGS
2014-11-17	331	8	DGS
2014-11-21	336	10	DGS

On 7 November 2014, authorities were alerted about an unusually large number of patients infected with Legionella: in 24 hours, the Vila Franca de Xira hospital received 27 patients with this infection and there were six more cases in other hospitals in Lisbon. The patients were from Forte da Casa, Póvoa de Santa Iria, Vialonga, in Vila Franca de Xira, and also from Bucelas, Loures and Samora Correia, Benavente. The municipality of Vila Franca de Xira promptly asserted that tests carried out by the municipal water and sanitation authority (SMAS) did not find any evidence of Legionella in the tap water.

By midday on 8 November, there were already 59 known cases. At the end of the same day, there were 90 known cases of Legionella infections, including 1 fatality. Authorities stated that the first fatality was a 59-year-old male that was a heavy smoker and died 3 hours after arriving at the hospital.

On 9 November, the number of cases was updated to 120. Two more people, a 66-year-old male and an 81-year-old female, both with preexisting conditions, died in the hospital, raising the number of fatalities to 3. 6 more people were in critical condition. In the afternoon, the number of cases was reported to be 180 and 4 fatalities. 24 people are in the intensive care unit.

On 11 November, the World Health Organization declared the Legionella outbreak in Portugal a major public health emergency.

On 12 November, there were 302 known cases and 7 fatalities related to this outbreak, with 49 people in intensive care units and two more deaths under investigation. Cases in Luanda, Angola and Lima, Peru were suspected to be connected to the outbreak.

On 13 November, there were 311 cases and 7 fatalities. The two cases that had been observed abroad were found to be unrelated to this outbreak.

On 17 November, there were 331 cases and 8 fatalities.

On 21 November, there were 336 cases and 10 fatalities. The outbreak was declared to be over.

== Sources ==
A total of 20 locations were examined on 8 November. Another 5 locations, 4 factories and 1 hotel, were examined on 9 November.

On 11 November, Solvay confirmed that the first results from their factory in Póvoa de Santa Iria came positive for Legionella, but the results of more comprehensive tests, done at Ricardo Jorge National Health Institute (INSA) were not available yet. These tests included samples from other factories in the region, such as Adubos de Portugal (ADP) and Central de Cervejas. Later on the same day, it was also reported that the ADP factory would be further investigated. It was expected that the new investigation would shed some light on whether there was criminal activity behind the outbreak.

On 21 November, it was confirmed that the ADP factory was the source of the outbreak.

== Prevention measures ==
Authorities recommended people to avoid taking showers and using high-pressure water sources as well as avoiding air-conditioning devices and places where airborne water particles are present. Blood donations in some parts of the affected district were halted.
