= Póvoa de Santa Iria =

City in Vila Franca de Xira, Portugal

- Civil parish
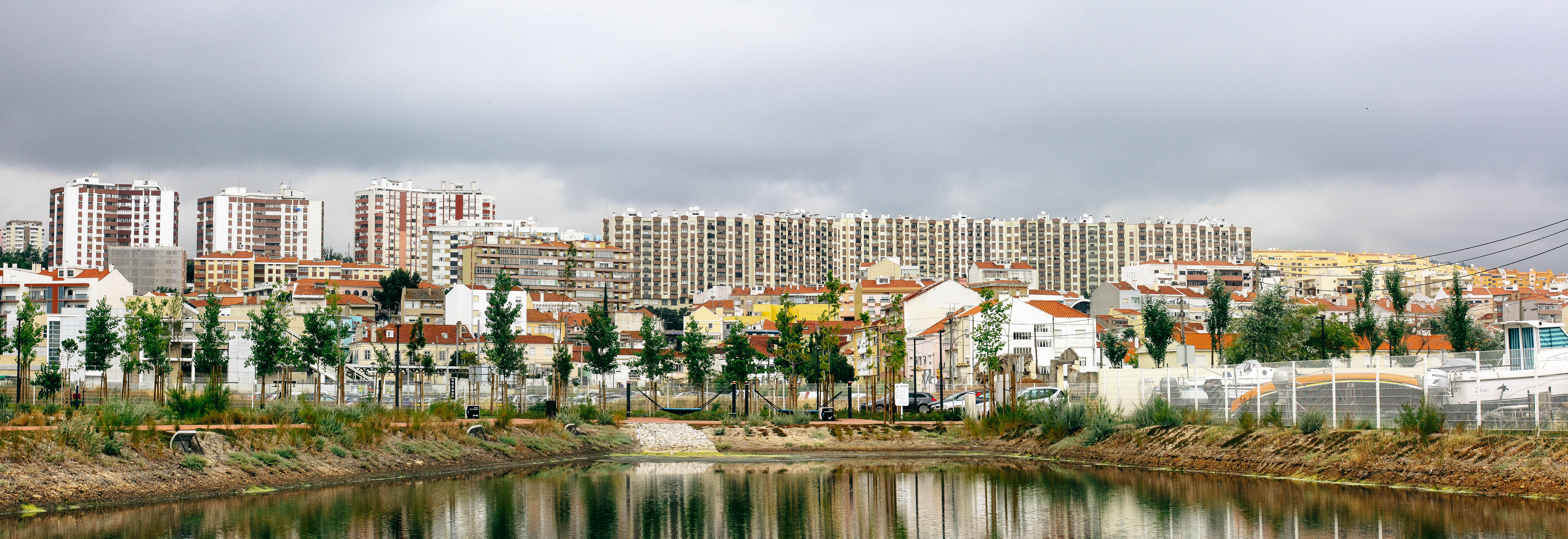
- View of Póvoa de Santa Iria from the riverside area

- Location in Portugal
- Coordinates: 38.862°N 9.069°W
- Country: Portugal
- Region: Lisbon
- District: Lisbon
- Municipality: Vila Franca de Xira
- Established: 1916
- Disbanded: 2013

Population (2011)
  - Total: 29,348
- Time zone: UTC+00:00 (WET)
  - Summer (DST): UTC+01:00 (WEST)
- Postal code: 2625

Póvoa de Santa Iria is a city and former freguesia in the municipality of Vila Franca de Xira, Portugal. Since 2013, it is part of the freguesia Póvoa de Santa Iria e Forte da Casa. Its population in 2011 was 29,348.

== History ==
=== Prehistory and Roman period ===
There is evidence of human settlement during the Upper Paleolithic in the land where present-day Póvoa de Santa Iria is located. Stone tools dating from this period have been found in some upper areas of the city.

There is also evidence of Roman occupation in the area, particularly through isolated finds such as amphoras near the Tagus River. A significant Roman milestone, reused in later times, was discovered near the current EN115-5 road, about 400 meters southwest of the settlement. The area's proximity to Olisipo (currently Lisbon) and its strategic location along the Tagus River likely led to a substantial Roman presence, with the region possibly serving as a rural settlement focused on agriculture.

=== Middle Ages and early Modern Era ===
In 1336, the land was designated part of the Póvoa majorat (Morgado da Póvoa) by Vicente Afonso Valente, for the benefit of his brother Lourenço Afonso Valente. The majorat was centered around the Quinta da Piedade, a quinta with a view over the Tagus River. In the 16th century, Dom Martinho Vaz de Castelo Branco became the seventh lord of the Póvoa majorat and owner of the Quinta da Piedade, after which the settlement came to be known as Póvoa de Dom Martinho. This name persisted for three centuries.

In 1856, the Póvoa train station was inaugurated, linking the area to the center of Lisbon. It was part of Portugal's first railway line, which ran between Lisbon and Carregado.

After the extinction of the majorats in Portugal in 1863, the settlement obtained its current name, Póvoa de Santa Iria. The settlement had a strong connection with the Tagus river and its population had fishing, salt extraction and river transport as their main activities.

1867 marked the start of the industrial activity in Póvoa de Santa Iria with the opening of the Póvoa Factory, which produced chemical products.

=== 20th and 21st centuries ===
In 1916 the freguesia (civil parish) of Póvoa de Santa Iria was created, as part of the Loures municipality. In 1926, the civil parish was detached from the Loures municipality and integrated in the Vila Franca de Xira municipality. In the second half of the 20th century, a sharp population increase occurred in Póvoa de Santa Iria and the settlement was mainly converted into a commuter town. Following its expansion, Póvoa de Santa Iria was formally designated a vila (town) in 1985 and a cidade (city) in 1999. After a major territorial administration reorganization in Portugal in 2013, the civil parish of Póvoa de Santa Iria was merged with the neighboring civil parish of Forte da Casa.

In November 2014, Póvoa de Santa Iria was one of the locations most affected by a legionellosis outbreak in the Vila Franca de Xira municipality.

== Transportation ==
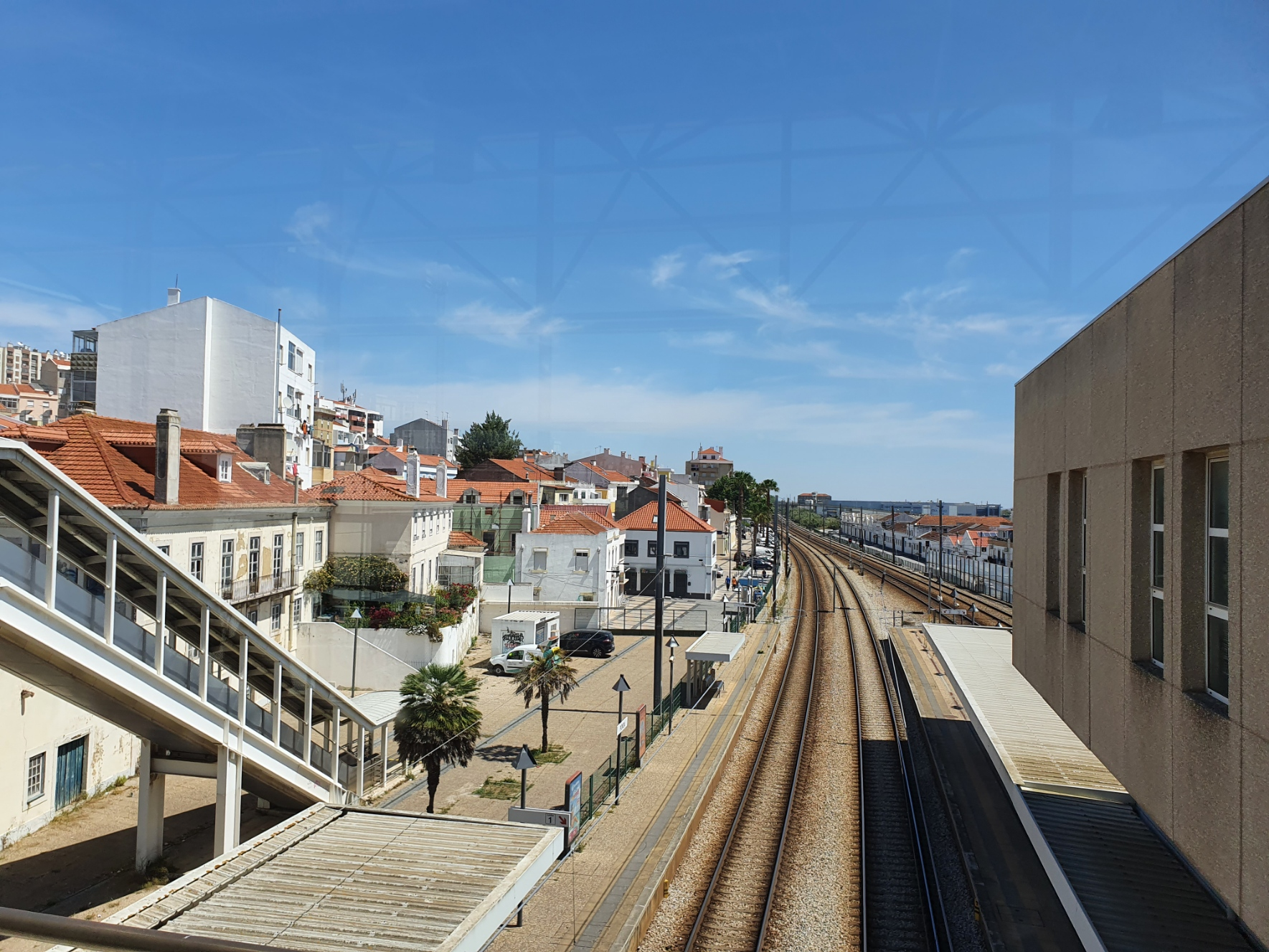
The North Line passing through the Póvoa train station

Póvoa de Santa Iria is served by the Póvoa train station, which is part of the North Line and an important point of connection with the city of Lisbon. This station was the site of a tragic train accident on 5 May 1986, which claimed the lives of 17 people, making it one of the deadliest train disasters in Portugal's history.

The city is also served by multiple bus lines from Carris Metropolitana, connecting with other points in the municipalities of Vila Franca de Xira, Loures and Lisbon.

== Sports ==
Póvoa de Santa Iria's football club is União Atlético Povoense, which competes in the Second Division of the Lisbon Football Association.
