= Forte da Casa =

Town in Vila Franca de Xira, Portugal

- Civil parish
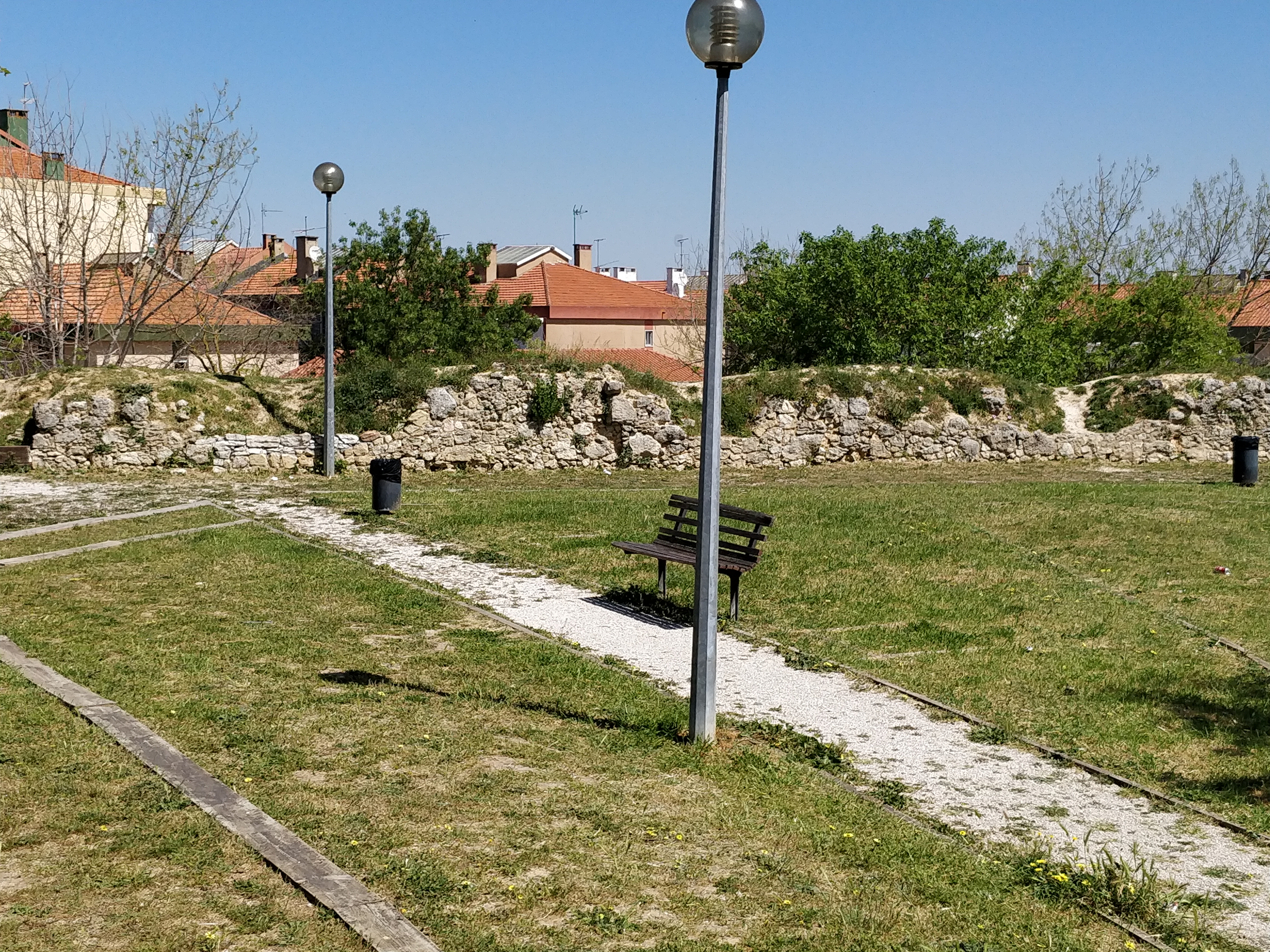
- Ruins of the Fort of Casa, in Forte da Casa

- Location in Portugal
- Coordinates: 38.872°N 9.058°W
- Country: Portugal
- Region: Lisbon
- District: Lisbon
- Municipality: Vila Franca de Xira
- Disbanded: 2013

Population (2011)
  - Total: 11,056
- Time zone: UTC+00:00 (WET)
  - Summer (DST): UTC+01:00 (WEST)

Forte da Casa is a town and former civil parish in the municipality of Vila Franca de Xira, Portugal. Since 2013, it is part of the civil parish Póvoa de Santa Iria e Forte da Casa. Its population in 2011 was 11,056 in an area of 3.96 km^{2}.

== History ==
The town of Forte da Casa takes its name from the Fort of Casa, a fortification that was part of the second line of the Lines of Torres Vedras, built between 1809 and 1810 to defend Lisbon against the French troops during the Peninsular War. The ruins of the fortification can be seen today in a small urban park inside the town.

Prior to 1985, Forte da Casa belonged to the civil parish of Vialonga. After a sharp population increase in the 1970s and 1980s, the civil of parish of Forte da Casa was created on 12 July 1985. After a major territorial administration reorganization in Portugal in 2013, the civil parish of Forte da Casa was merged with the neighboring civil parish of Póvoa de Santa Iria.

In November 2014, Forte da Casa was one of the locations most affected by a Legionella outbreak in the Vila Franca de Xira municipality.
