= Diário de Notícias (Madeira) =

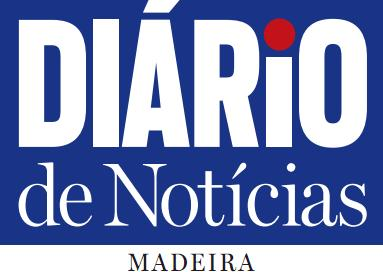
- Type: Regional daily newspaper
- Format: Tabloid
- Owner(s): Sousa Group (77%); Blandy Group (12%)
- Founder: Alfredo César de Oliveira
- President: Michael Blandy
- Editor-in-chief: Ricardo Miguel Oliveira
- Deputy editor: Roberto Ferreira
- Founded: 11 October 1876
- Political alignment: Centre-left
- Language: Portuguese
- Headquarters: Rua Dr. Fernão de Ornelas, 56, 3º, 9054 - 514 Funchal
- Circulation: 9023
- Website: dnoticias.pt

Diário de Notícias, locally known as Diário de Notícias da Madeira, is a Madeiran newspaper headquartered in Funchal, Portugal. In January 2020 its daily circulation was on average 9023, making it the largest Portuguese regional newspaper in circulation. In 2016 it counted 5600 subscribers. Its Sunday magazine is D7.

== History ==
It was founded on October 12, 1876, by Canon Alfredo César de Oliveira, a man of culture, an energetic parliamentarian, and an ardent polemicist. Considering his intellectual background as a combat journalist, the canon gave his daily a predominantly newsworthy character from the outset, covering as many regional facts as possible in order to captivate and interest all social strata, while continuing to agitate and defend the real problems of Madeira

Five newspapers were published the same year (1876): A Verdade, A Aurora Liberal, A Aurora Literária, Estrela Académica and Liberal. The difference between Diário de Notícias and its competitors lay in the fact that the first presented itself as a daily publication, which at the time many thought unimaginable given the population of readers on the island. In its first issue, the editorial highlights a phrase that reflects the character and objectives of the periodical:

... we strive, as much as it fits in the interests of the population.

Tristão Vaz Teixeira de Bettencourt da Câmara, 1st Baron of Jardim do Mar, was its director and owner.

On October 5, 1911, when Funchal's telephone network was inaugurated, the first telephone communication was established between Diário de Notícias' headquarters and the Central Station, where Manuel Augusto Martins, at the time governor of the now-defunct District of Funchal, was located.

Since 2005, when it was acquired by Lusomundo Serviços, it has belonged to the Controlinveste group (now Global Media Group).

In 2010, in the 12th European Newspaper Award, Diário de Notícias was awarded "European Newspaper of the Year" in the local newspaper category, an unprecedented distinction in the history of journalism in Madeira.

On 14 February 2014, the biggest shareholders, Sousa Group and Blandy Group, signed an agreement of intentions in which, once the deal is concluded, the majority of the capital will belong to the former with 77%, while the latter holds 12%.

== Regular columnists ==
As a daily newspaper, Diário de Notícias has regular columnists that contribute to its opinion section, many with political and business links.

Columnist	Background
Nuno Morna	Leader of Liberal Initiative Madeira
Sofia Canha	Member of the Legislative Assembly of Madeira for the Socialist Party
Pedro Fontes	Lawyer
Marta Caires	Pundit
João Paulo Marques	Former member of the Legislative Assembly of Madeira for the Social Democratic Party
Elisa Seixas	Member of the Legislative Assembly of Madeira for the Socialist Party

== Political alignment and criticism ==
Although the editorial statues declare the newspaper "objective, independent and a source responsible information, based on the defence of the interests of Madeirans and Porto-Santenses, their Autonomy, as well as the National interest in which it is integrated", it has faced great criticism from members of the Madeira Social Democratic Party, namely Alberto João Jardim. The former President of the Regional Government of Madeira has accused the owners of the newspaper, Blandy Group, of meddling, over a period of more than 40 years, in the regional political system and of promoting colonialism through their links with Masonry and the Madeira Socialist Party.
