= Pedra Furada (disambiguation) =

Pedra Furada is a collection of archaeological sites in the state of Piauí, Brazil.

Pedra Furada may also refer to:

- Pedra Furada (Santa Catarina), a naturally formed rock arch in Urubici, Brazil
- Pedra Furada, former Portuguese civil parish now part of Chorente, Góios, Courel, Pedra Furada e Gueral
- Cave of Pedra Furada in Portugal
