= Hermitage of Nossa Senhora de Alcamé =

Catholic church in Portugal

Hermitage of Our Lady of Alcamé
- Ermida de Nossa Senhora de Alcamé
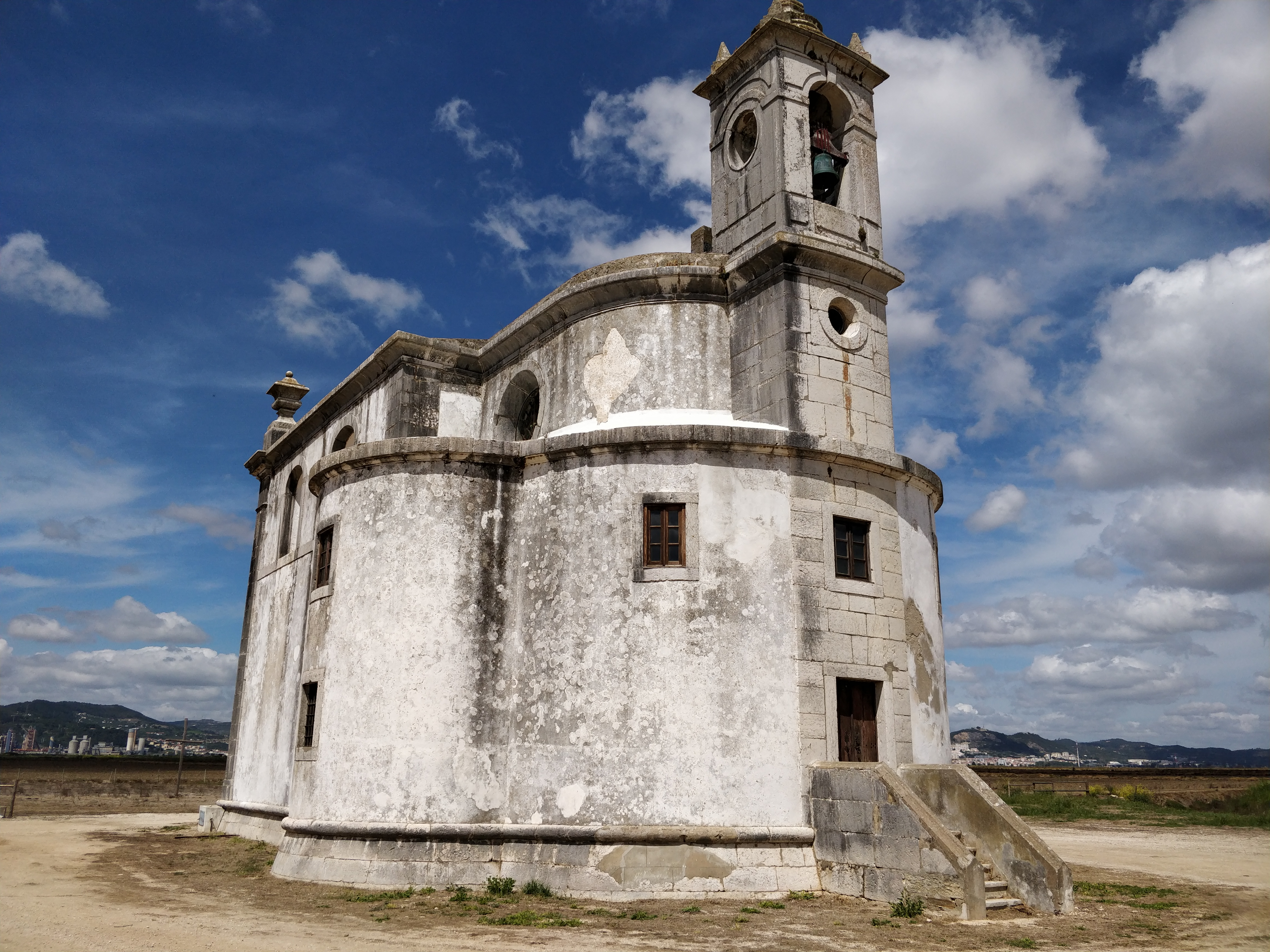
- Hermitage of Our Lady of Alcamé
- 38°54′24″N 8°58′16″W
- Location: Vila Franca de Xira,
- Country: Portugal
- Denomination: Catholic Church in Portugal

Architecture
- Style: Baroque and Neoclassical
- Years built: 1746-55
- Completed: 1755 approx.

The Hermitage of Nossa Senhora de Alcamé (Our Lady of Alcamé) (Portuguese: Ermida de Nossa Senhora de Alcamé) is situated on the Lezíria flood plain on the left bank of the River Tagus, in the municipality of Vila Franca de Xira in the Lisbon District of Portugal. Designed by José Manuel de Carvalho e Negreiros, its construction was ordered in 1746 by the First Patriarch of Lisbon, Tomás de Almeida, and continued until around 1755.

== History ==
The hermitage was constructed in the middle of farmland used for cattle grazing as well as the production of fodder, maize (corn) and rice. It is likely that it was built so that farmers and agricultural workers could attend Mass on holy days as urban churches were unreachable. At the same time it provided a safe place where these workers could go whenever the area was affected by floods. Its importance declined with the mechanization of agriculture, which meant that small-scale farming became uncompetitive. The church is baroque in style and of considerable size considering it was built in an unpopulated area. It has a single nave and a main chapel at the same height, together with a bell tower. It is similar to its contemporary, the Hermitage São José, which is also located in Lezíria and was probably designed by the same architect. In 1983, the church was desecrated and the original image of Our Lady of the Conception (popularly known as Our Lady of Alcamé) and a gold-toned altarpiece were stolen.

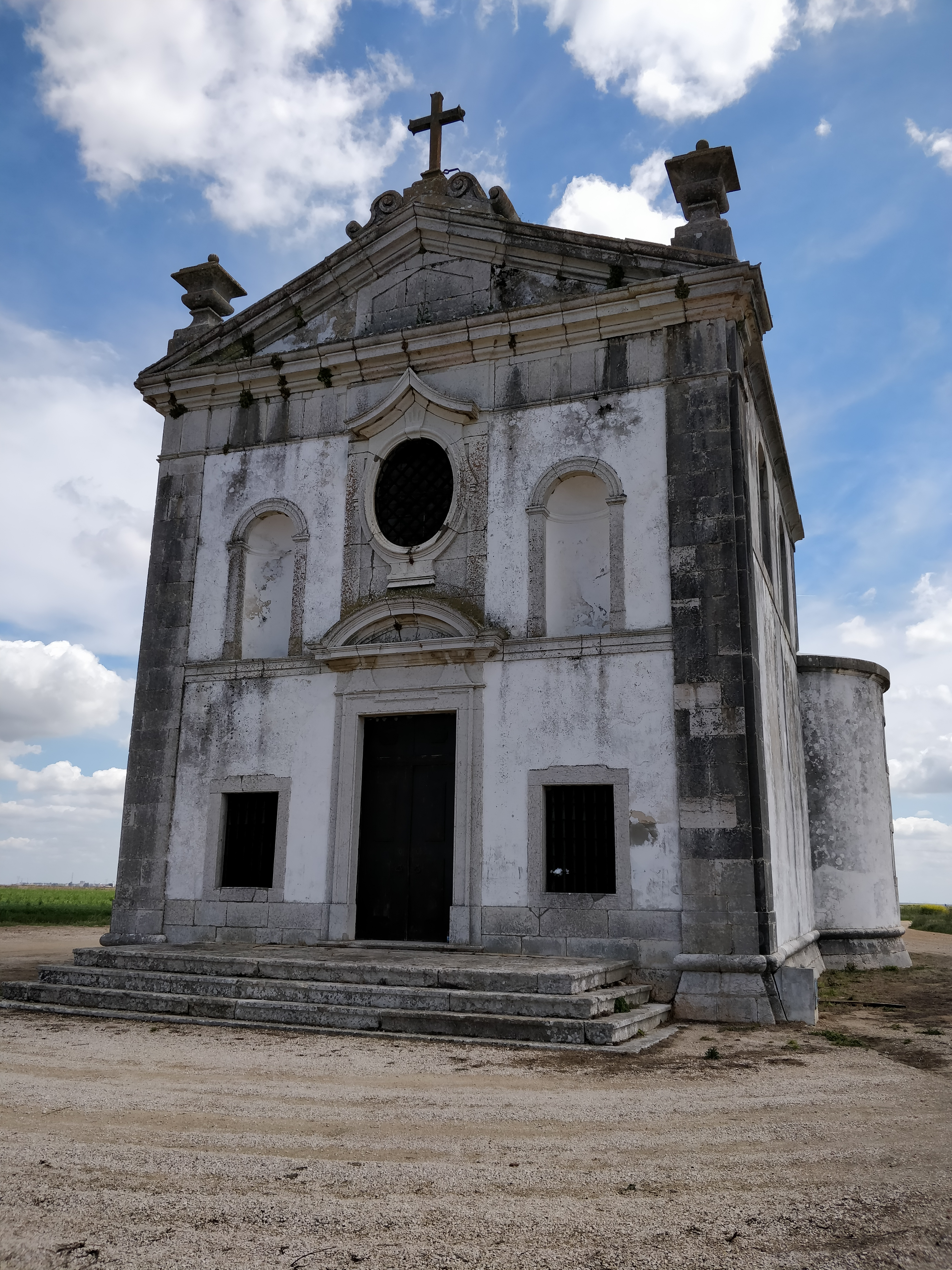
View from the front

The name Alcamé is believed to come from the Arab-Moroccan "achmé", meaning wheat, reflecting the crop grown in the area at the time of establishment. From the 19th century the hermitage became an important place of pilgrimage as a result of a legend that a farmer was saved from the bite of a serpent by invoking the Virgin Mary who closed the serpent's mouth with an apple. The pilgrimages ceased for some time but began again in the 1940s until ceasing in 1973 only to start again in 2000. Pilgrims often travel by boat from Vila Franca de Xira on the right bank of the Tagus to the hermitage on the left bank. The pilgrimage from Vila Franca de Xira is held every 10 June and recreates the original peasant culture of the Lezíria flood plain, with the image of the Virgin in a cart being pulled by oxen.

The area of the hermitage is crossed by several drainage channels. Several of them are lined with reeds and present an ideal location for several species of bird including the purple heron (Ardea purpurea), the white stork (Ciconia ciconia), the Eurasian coot (Fulica atra), the whiskered tern (Chlidonias hybrida), the black kite (Milvus migrans), the osprey (Pandion haliaetus), eagles and owls.
