= Diogo Santos =

Portuguese footballer

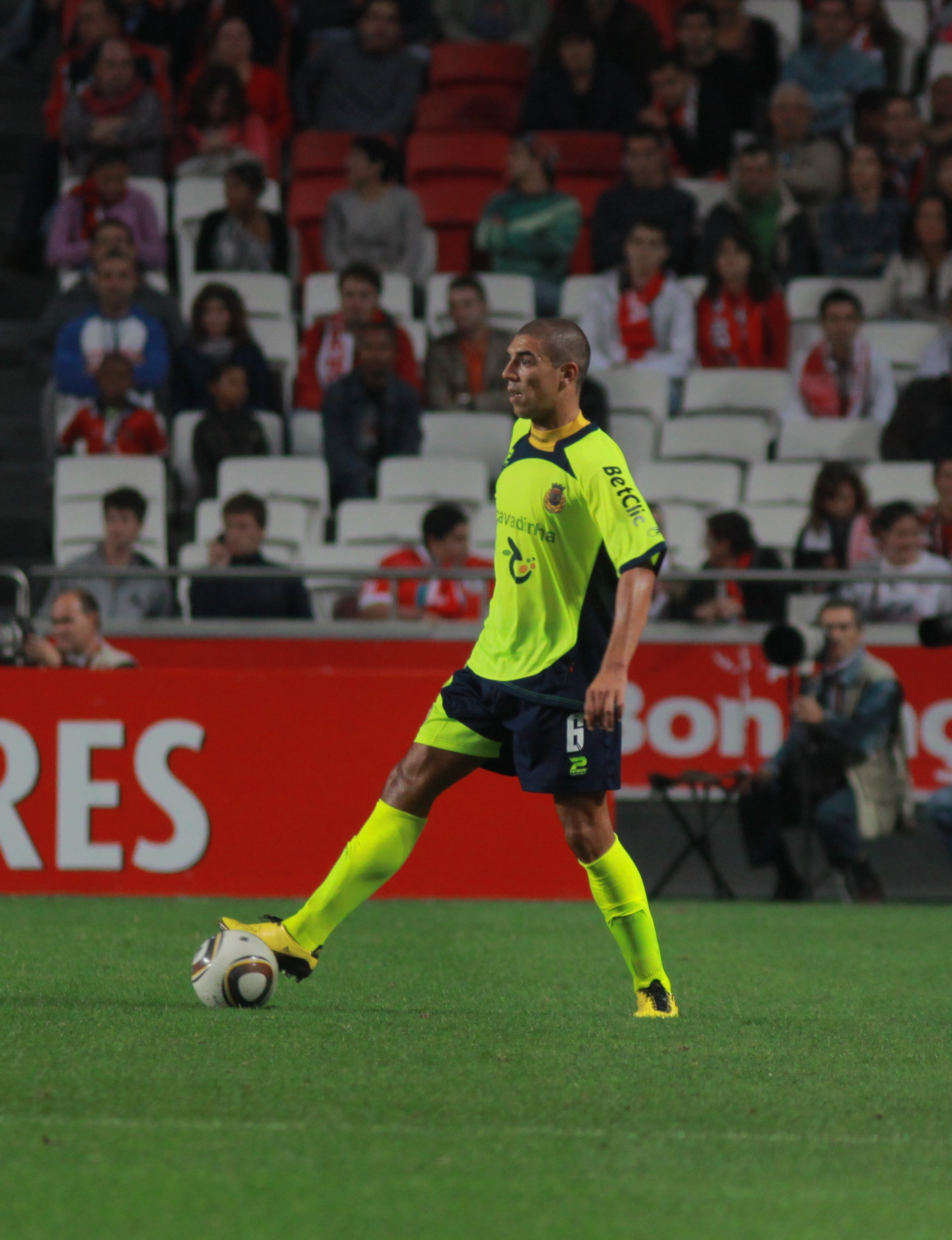
- Santos in action for Arouca in 2010

Personal information
- Full name: Diogo de Almeida Santos
- Date of birth: 13 November 1984 (age 41)
- Place of birth: Vila Franca de Xira, Portugal
- Height: 1.90 m (6 ft 3 in)
- Position: Defensive midfielder

Youth career
- 1995–2003: Oliveirense

Senior career*
Years	Team	Apps	(Gls)
2003–2008	Oliveirense	143	(11)
2008–2009	Gil Vicente	8	(0)
2010–2012	Arouca	53	(5)
2012–2013	Oliveirense	45	(4)
2013–2015	Brașov	25	(0)
2015–2016	Famalicão	37	(1)
2016–2019	Santa Clara	66	(6)
2019–2021	Académico Viseu	46	(5)
2021–2022	Felgueiras 1932	19	(3)
2022-2023	A.D. Castro Daire	25	(1)
Total		466	(35)
- * Club domestic league appearances and goals as of 18:36, 31 August 2024 (UTC)

Diogo de Almeida Santos (born 13 November 1984) is a retired Portuguese professional footballer who played most successfully for U.D. Oliveirense, F.C. Arouca, F.C. Famalicão, C.D. Santa Clara, and A.C. Viseu, as a defensive midfielder. He retired at the end of the 2023 season at the age of 39.

== Club career ==
Born in Vila Franca de Xira, Lisbon District, Santos started his senior career with U.D. Oliveirense, spending his first five seasons in the third division and scoring a career-best five goals in his last. In the 2008 off-season he signed with Gil Vicente F.C. of the Segunda Liga, making his debut in the competition on 24 August in a 1–1 away draw against his former club.

Santos returned to the third tier in January 2010, joining Arouca and helping to promotion in his first year. In 2011–12 he contributed ten appearances and one goal during the first half of the campaign, but finished it with Oliveirense.

On 19 June 2013, Santos moved abroad after agreeing to a two-year contract at SR Brașov in the Romanian Liga I. After featuring sparingly during his spell, he returned to Portugal and its division two by signing a one-year deal with F.C. Famalicão.

Santos joined C.D. Santa Clara in June 2016, reuniting with manager Daniel Ramos in the process. In 2017–18, he scored three times from 26 appearances as the club returned to the Primeira Liga after a 15-year absence.

Santos played his first match in the Portuguese top flight on 12 August 2018 at the age of 33 years and nine months, coming on as a late substitute in a 1–0 away loss to C.S. Marítimo. In the following transfer window, he returned to the second division with Académico Viseu FC.

On 27 July 2021, Santos moved to F.C. Felgueiras 1932.

== Personal life ==
In June 2022, Portugal's Supreme Court of Justice allowed Santos to proceed in a lawsuit against American video game company Electronic Arts for the alleged unauthorised use of his name and image in their FIFA series. Citing Lionel Messi's US$50 million deal with the company, he requested at least €53,900. Italy's La Gazzetta dello Sport wrote that he was the first footballer to take EA to court, although Zlatan Ibrahimović and Gareth Bale's case against the company had been dismissed; the newspaper also stated that the use of all footballers' images was legitimate due to a deal with the FIFPro trade union.
