= Vila Franca de Xira Bullring =

Bullfighting arena in Portugal

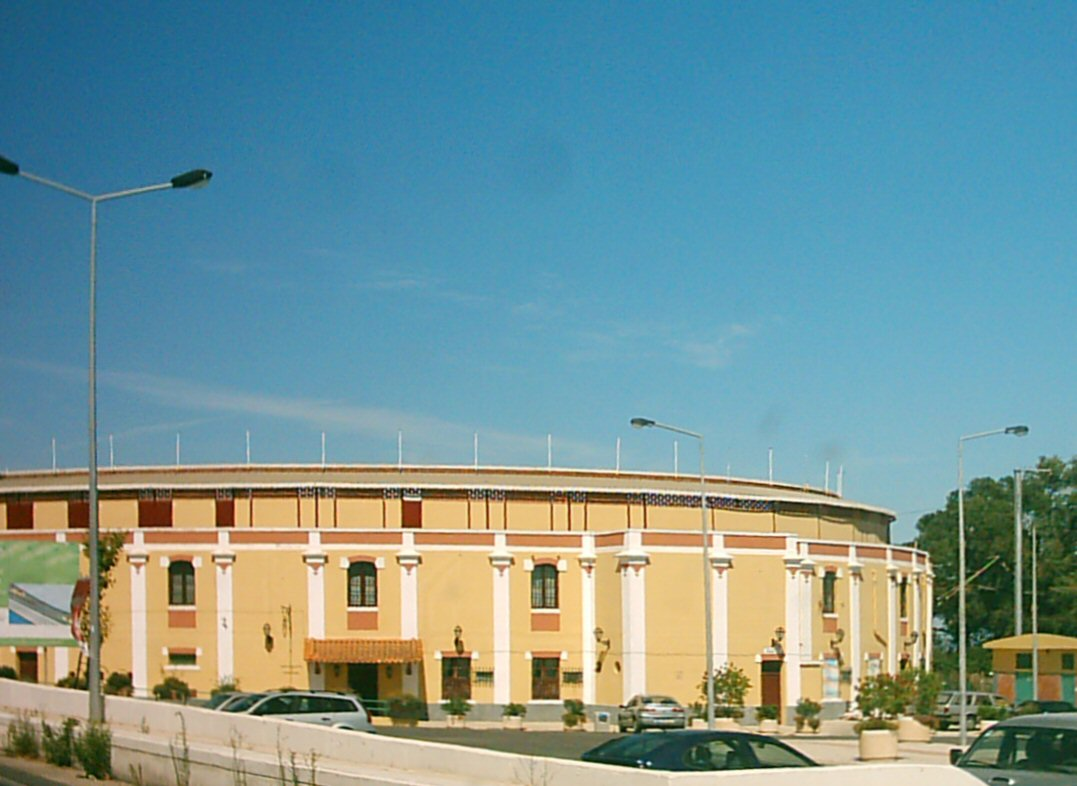
- The Bullring in Vila Franca de Xira
- Interactive map of the Vila Franca de Xira Bullring area

General information
- Type: Bullring
- Location: Vila Franca de Xira, Portugal
- Coordinates: 38°56′59″N 8°59′28″W
- Completed: 1901
- Opening: 1901; 125 years ago

The Vila Franca de Xira Bullring, also known as the Palha Blanco Bullring (Portuguese: Praça de Touros Palha Blanco) is situated in the centre of the town of Vila Franca de Xira in the municipality of the same name in the Lisbon District of Portugal. It was built in 1901, is still used and is one of the eight “First Category” bullrings in the country.

In 1937 the bullring was named after José Pereira Palha Blanco, a cattle raiser, who organised a group of benefactors to form a joint-stock company to fund the building. Prior to its construction there had been three other bullrings on the same site, all constructed out of wood. The first was unsuitable because it lacked the traditional round shape, the second proved inadequate, and the third burned down. The inaugural bullfights in the new ring were held on September 30, 1901 and the bullring achieved prominence in 1905 when King Carlos attended.

In addition to bullfighting the ring has hosted performances by artists such as the Portuguese fado singer Amália Rodrigues. It has also been used for boxing events, carnival parades, contests between bands and as an open-air cinema, as well as for charitable events. During the rule of the totalitarian Estado Novo it was used for parades by the Mocidade Portuguesa, a right-wing youth organisation. During World War II, it was used by cavalry mobilised for the war.

Bullfighters to fight at the ring have included Domingo Ortega, Conchita Cintrón and Carlos Arruza, as well as Álvaro Domecq y Díez who is credited with reviving bullfighting on horseback. The ring is one of the few in Portugal to not witness the death of a bullfighter. It has hosted several contests resulting in the death of the bull, despite this being illegal in Portugal, and the bullfighters were arrested.

There are plans to build a Portuguese bullfighting museum in the Palha Blanco. At the same time there remains opposition to the sport, which in April 2017 resulted in some vandalism of the stadium, primarily through the use of graffiti.
