= Alverca do Ribatejo =

City in Vila Franca de Xira, Portugal

- Civil parish
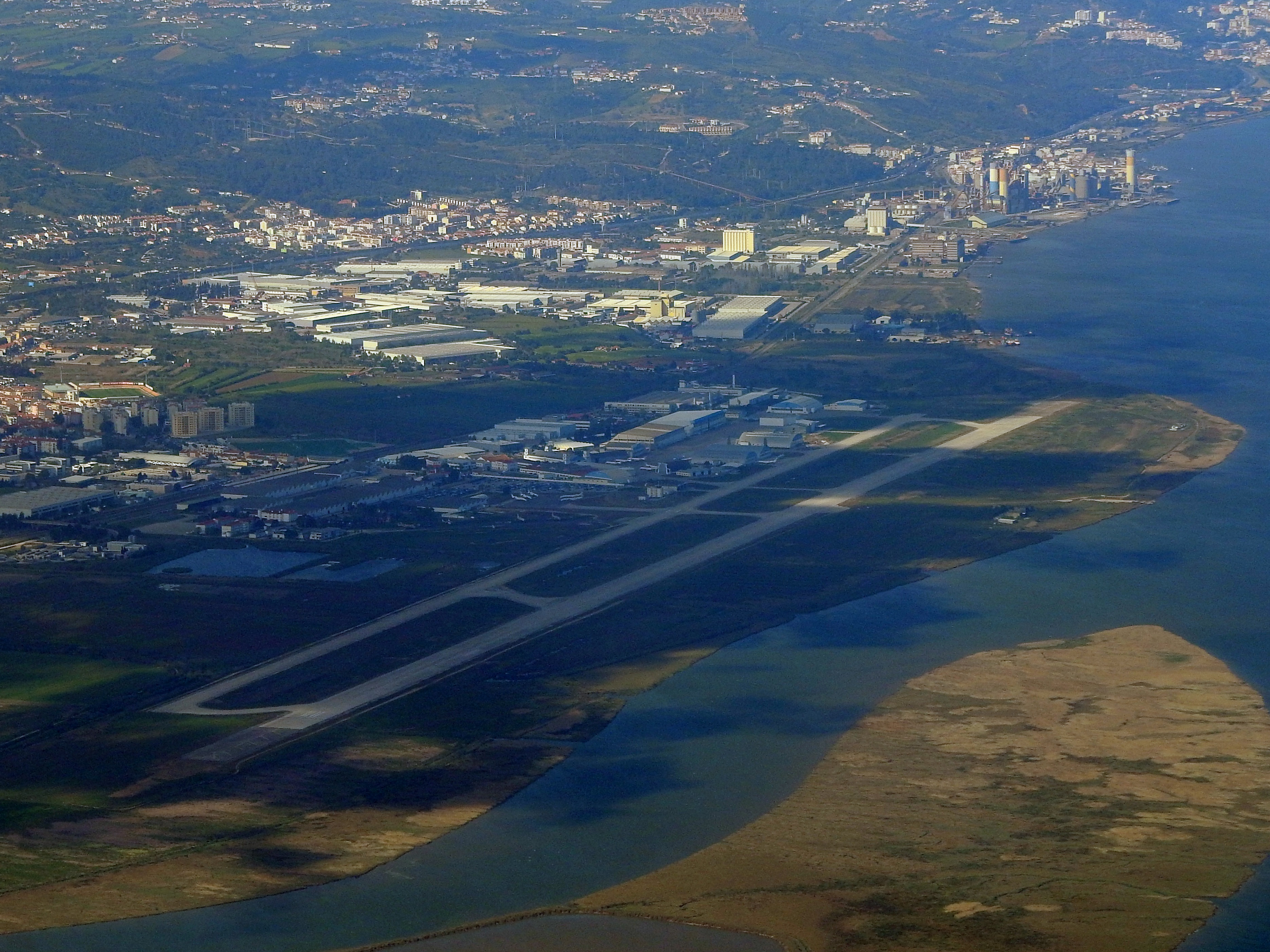
- The military airbase in Alverca

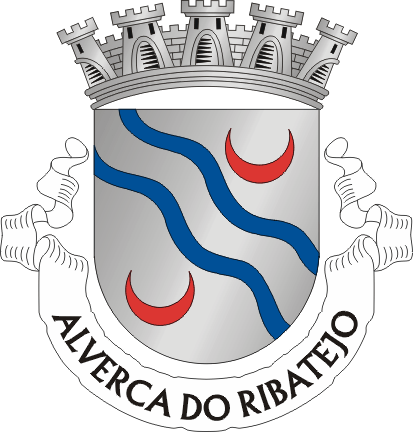
- Coat of arms

- Location in Portugal
- Coordinates: 38°53′24″N 09°02′24″W
- Country: Portugal
- Region: Lisbon
- Metropolitan area: Lisbon
- District: Lisbon
- Municipality: Vila Franca de Xira
- Disbanded: 2013

Area
  - Total: 17.89 km^{2} (6.91 sq mi)

Population (2011)
  - Total: 31,070
  - Density: 1,737/km^{2} (4,498/sq mi)
- Time zone: UTC+00:00 (WET)
  - Summer (DST): UTC+01:00 (WEST)

Alverca do Ribatejo (Portuguese pronunciation: [alˈvɛɾkɐ ðu ʁiβɐˈtɛʒu]) is a city (cidade) and a former civil parish in the municipality of Vila Franca de Xira, Portugal. In 2013, the parish merged into the new parish Alverca do Ribatejo e Sobralinho.

It covers an area of 17.89 square kilometres (6.91 sq mi) and as of 2011 had a population of 31,070, making it the largest city in the municipality of Vila Franca de Xira. It was promoted to city status in 1990. It is a city and a suburb near the Tagus River (rio Tejo), in the Lisbon metropolitan area.

Alverca has been deeply connected with aviation since the early 20th century. A military air base named 'Alverca Air Base' was built there in 1918. The aerospace company OGMA, the Portuguese Air Force General Storage, the Air Force Aerodrome Engineering Unit and a branch of the Air Museum are presently based there. The Alverca aviation facilities also housed the first international airport of Portugal, closed after the inauguration of Lisbon Airport in 1942.

Philippe Cousteau died in 1979 after his flying boat crashed into the Tagus in the vicinity of Alverca.
