= Sousa Group =

Portugal private business group

- Native name: Grupo Sousa
- Type: Privately held company
- Founded: 1998
- Founder: Luís Miguel Sousa
- Headquarters: Funchal, Portugal
- Area served: Americas; Africa; Europe; Middle East; Asia
- Owner: LUMISO SGPS (60%); SOUSAPAR SGPS (20%); RUSAMAR SGPS (10%); BETASOL SGPS (10)
- Divisions: Shipping; Harbour Operations; Logistics; Energy; Tourism
- Subsidiaries: GS Lines, PCI - Portusline Containers International, Porto Santo Line, Steermar, PMAR Navegação, PMAR Cabo Verde, PMAR Guiné Bissau, OPM, ETP, LCP - Lisbon Cruise Port, TSA- Terminal de Santa Apolónia, Logislink, Opertrans, Marmod, Metal Lobos, Gáslink, WindMad, Luamar Aparthotel, Torre Praia Hotel, Praia Dourada Hotel, Agência Ferraz, Pizza N'Areia, Corsário Beach Bar, Salinas Restaurante, Ponta da Calheta Restaurante, Porto Santo Line Travel.

Sousa Group is a Portuguese private business group based in Funchal, Madeira. It is a maritime-port, logistics, energy and tourism operator and is considered the largest Portuguese shipowner.

The Sousa Group includes cargo shipping companies GS Lines, the shipping company Porto Santo Line where it operates with the ship Lobo Marinho. In the port operation area, it is responsible for the Madeira Port Operations Society - OPM and for the Santa Apolónia Terminal - TSL. In the area of shipping agents, it owns PMAR Navegação, PMAR Cabo Verde, PMAR Guinea-Bissau. The company also operates Logislink logistic operation centers and logistic terminals in Madeira, Azores, Alverca, Leixões and Porto Santo. In energy, it operates with Gáslink and WindMad. In addition, in the tourism area in Porto Santo the group operates with three hotels, two restaurants, a pizzeria, and a beach bar.

== Subsidiaries by business division ==
=== Shipping ===
Shipping Companies

- GS Lines (passou an incorporar PCI-Portline Containers International, SA, Boxlines e ENM )
- Porto Santo Line - Transportes Marítimos, Lda.

Ship Management

- Steermar - Shipmanagement Services, Lda

Shipping Agencies

- PMAR Navegação
- PMAR Guiné-Bissau
- PMAR Cabo Vede

=== Port operations ===
- OPM - Sociedade Operações Portuárias da Madeira, Lda.
- ETP - Empresa de Trabalho Portuário, Lda.
- TSA - Terminal de Santa Apolónia, Lda.
- LCT - Lisbon Cruise Terminals, Lda.

=== Logistics ===
Logistics Terminals

- Logislink Madeira
- Logislink Açores
- Logislink Alverca
- Logislink Matosinhos

Freight Forwarders

- Logislink - (passou an incorporar as operações dos transitários:

Bitrans - Agência Transitários Madeira, Lda. Bitranlis — Agentes Transitários, Lda. Transaje — Trânsitos e Transportes, Lda. PMAR Logistics, Lda)

- Marmod
- Opertrans Logística

Road transport

- Opertrans Equipamentos

Maintenance

- Metal-Lobos - Indústria Metalúrgica, Lda.

=== Energy ===
- Gáslink – Gás Natural, SA
- Windmad - Energias Renováveis, Lda.

=== Tourism ===
Travel agencies

- Porto Santo Line Travel, Lda.
- Agência de Viagens e Navegação Ferraz

Hotels

- Hotel Torre Praia ****
- Aparthotel Luamar ****
- Hotel Praia Dourada ***

Restaurants

- Restaurante Salinas
- Restaurante Pizza N'Areia
- O Corsário Beach Bar
- Restaurante-Bar Ponta da Calheta
