= Fort of Casa =

19th-century fort in Portugal

- Forte da Casa
- Forte da Casa, Vila Franca de Xira in Portugal
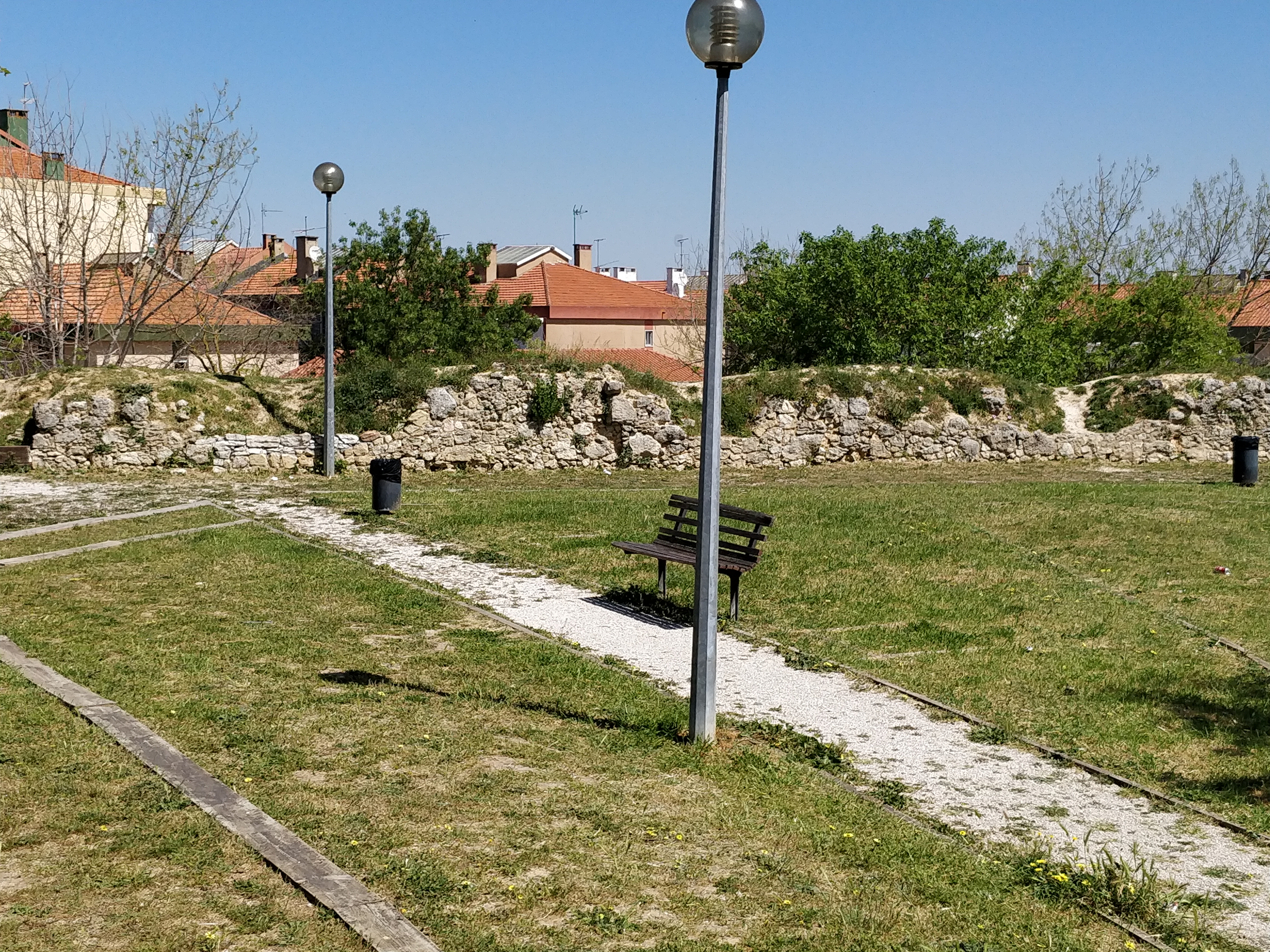

Site information
- Type: Fort
- Open to the public: Yes, including an interpretation centre
- Condition: Preserved and restored. Public park.

Location
- Coordinates: 38°52′28″N 9°03′24″W

Site history
- Built: 1809-10
- Built by: Duke of Wellington
- Fate: Unused in battle

Garrison information
- Garrison: 340

The Fort of Casa was the most easterly of the forts and redoubts built in 1809-10 during the Peninsular War on the second line of the three defensive Lines of Torres Vedras aimed at protecting the capital of Portugal, Lisbon. It is situated in the town of Forte da Casa, in the municipality of Vila Franca de Xira, in the Lisbon District.

== History ==
Following the Treaty of Fontainebleau signed between France and Spain in October 1807, which provided for the invasion and subsequent division of Portuguese territory into three kingdoms, French troops under the command of General Junot entered Portugal, which requested support from the British. In July 1808 troops commanded by the Duke of Wellington, at the time known as Arthur Wellesley, landed in Portugal and defeated French troops at the Battles of Roliça and Vimeiro. This forced Junot to negotiate the Convention of Cintra, which led to the evacuation of the French army from Portugal. In March 1809, Marshal Soult led a new French expedition that advanced south to the city of Porto before being repulsed by Portuguese-British troops and forced to withdraw.

The threat of a further invasion by the French led Wellington, on October 20, 1809, to order the secret construction of defensive lines in order to protect Lisbon from Napoléon Bonaparte's troops led by Marechal Masséna. A total of 152 military installations were constructed and they were each given a number. The Fort of Casa was Number 38 and it was originally named “Da Caza” by the Portuguese Major Brandão de Sousa. It had a star-shaped layout and, like most other forts of the Lines, it was built with a dry moat and equipped with a magazine. In 1810 it was garrisoned by around 340 soldiers, with five cannon. At an altitude of just 41 metres and close to the River Tagus it was given the task, together with the higher forts of Portela Grande and Portela Pequena, of potentially impeding the progress of the French army along two main roads. However, Masséna’s troops were repulsed by the first line of defence at Sobral de Monte Agraço and the Fort of Casa never saw action.

== The present day ==
The fort was excavated in 2008 and 2010 and the ruins are now incorporated into a small urban park. The site also contains a Lines of Torres Vedras “Interpretation Centre”, one of several in the region. The Centre informs visitors about the construction of the two northerly lines of Torres Vedras, the relation of the fort with other military works, and on the impact of the French invasion and construction of the forts on the people of the area.

== See also ==
- List of forts of the Lines of Torres Vedras
