= Vialonga, Portugal =

Town and civil parish in Vila Franca de Xira, Portugal

Vialonga
- Civil parish
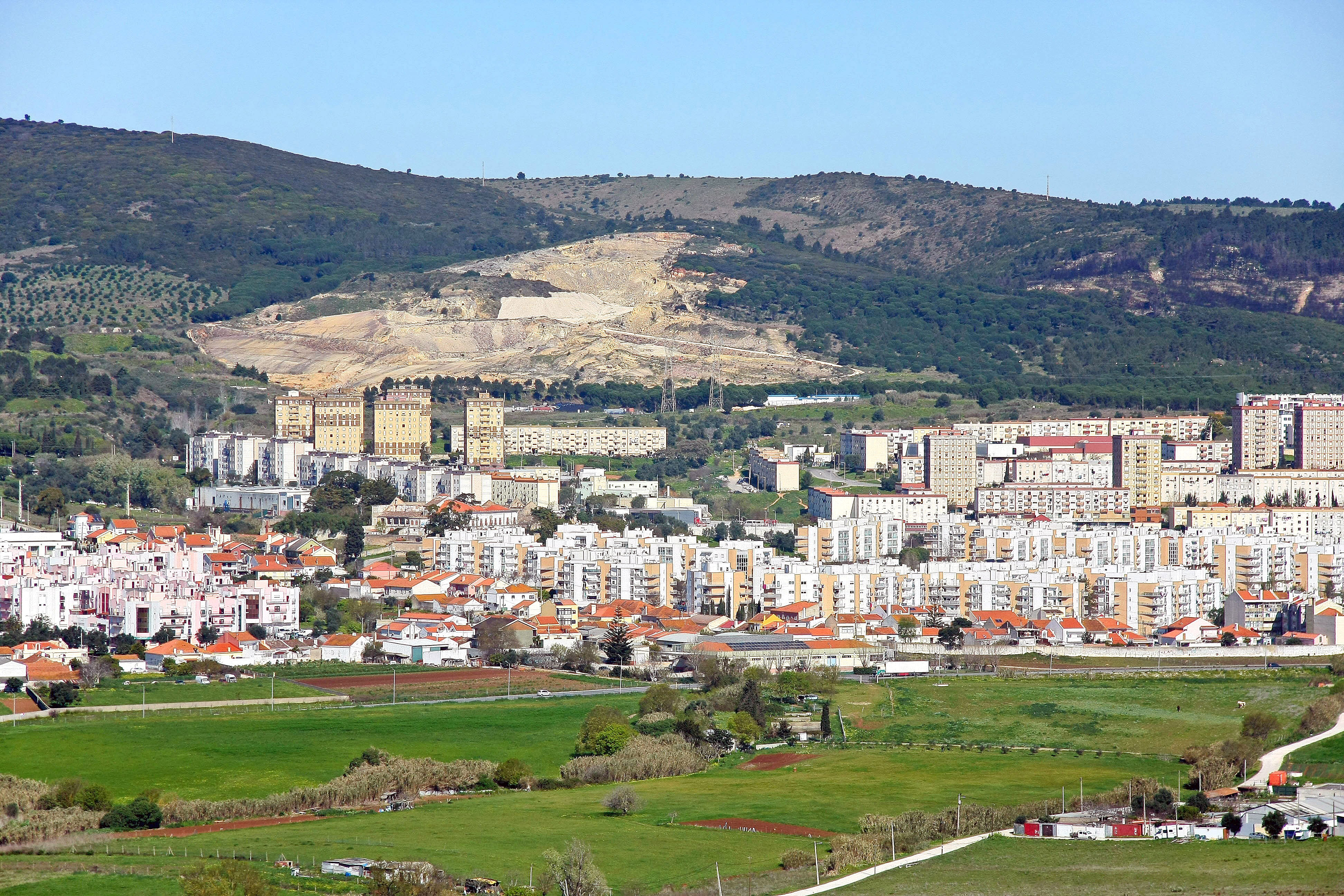

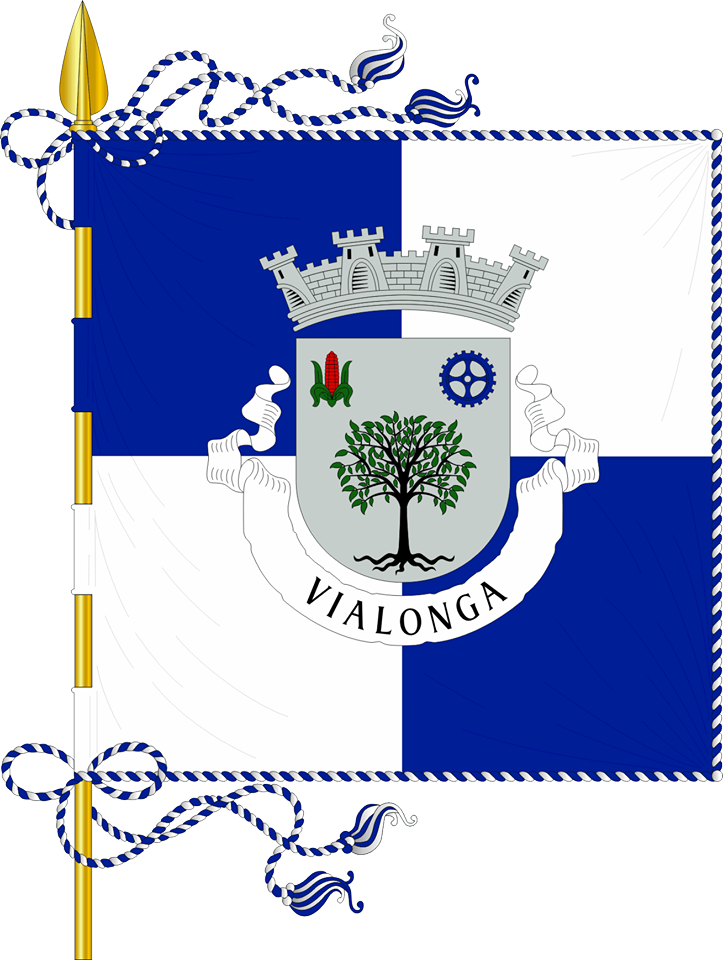
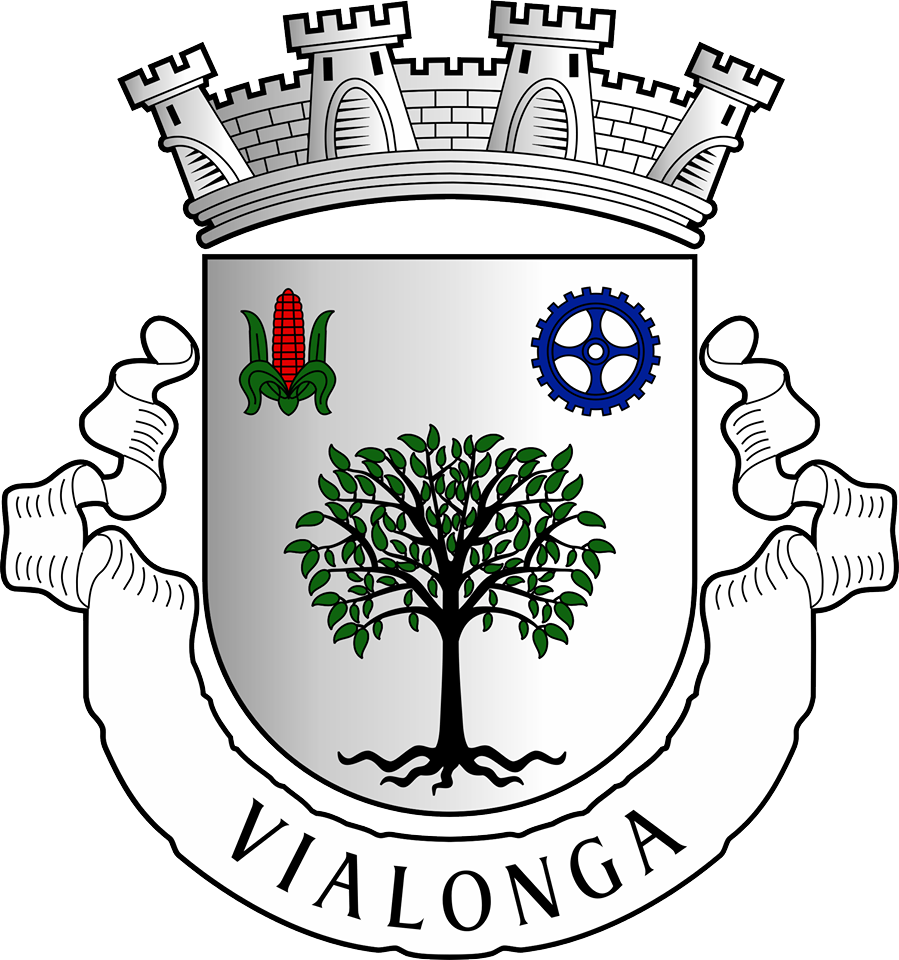
- Flag Coat of arms

- Location in Portugal
- Coordinates: 38.874°N 9.082°W
- Country: Portugal
- Region: Lisbon
- District: Lisbon
- Municipality: Vila Franca de Xira

Population (2021)
  - Total: 21,261
- Time zone: UTC+00:00 (WET)
  - Summer (DST): UTC+01:00 (WEST)

Vialonga is a town and freguesia (civil parish) in the municipality of Vila Franca de Xira, Portugal. Its population in 2021 was 21,261.

== History ==
The land where present-day Vialonga stands was occupied by humans in prehistoric ages, as evidenced by the dolmen cemeteries in Monte Serves and Casal do Penedo in the Vialonga parish. Other prehistoric religious objects, ornaments, metallic weapons and ceramics have been found in the area.

It is believed that the settlement in this area came from the times of Moorish rule in the Iberian Peninsula. Over the centuries, the settlement had various subtle changes in its name: Vila Longa, Vila-Longa, Via Longa, Via-Longa, until the current form "Vialonga".

In 1852, the freguesia of Vialonga was integrated into the Olivais municipality. After a restructuring of the Lisbon municipality in 1886, Vialonga became part of the Vila Franca de Xira municipality.

On 12 July 1985, the locality of Forte da Casa, until then part of the Vialonga freguesia, became a new freguesia. On 24 September 1985, Vialonga was promoted to the category of town (vila).

In November 2014, Vialonga was one of the locations most affected by a Legionella outbreak in the Vila Franca de Xira municipality.
