= Póvoa de Santa Iria e Forte da Casa =

Civil parish in Vila Franca de Xira, Portugal

- Civil parish
- Coat of arms

- Location in Portugal
- Coordinates: 38.86°N 9.06°W
- Country: Portugal
- Region: Lisbon
- Metropolitan area: Lisbon
- District: Lisbon
- Municipality: Vila Franca de Xira

Area
  - Total: 9.16 km^{2} (3.54 sq mi)

Population (2021)
  - Total: 40,905
  - Density: 4,500/km^{2} (12,000/sq mi)
- Time zone: UTC+00:00 (WET)
  - Summer (DST): UTC+01:00 (WEST)

Póvoa de Santa Iria e Forte da Casa is a freguesia in the municipality of Vila Franca de Xira, Portugal. It was formed in 2013 by the merger of the former freguesias of Póvoa de Santa Iria and Forte da Casa. The population in 2021 was 40,905, in an area of 9.16 km².

== See also ==
- Póvoa de Santa Iria
- Forte da Casa
