= Paulo Brissos =

Portuguese singer (born 1970)

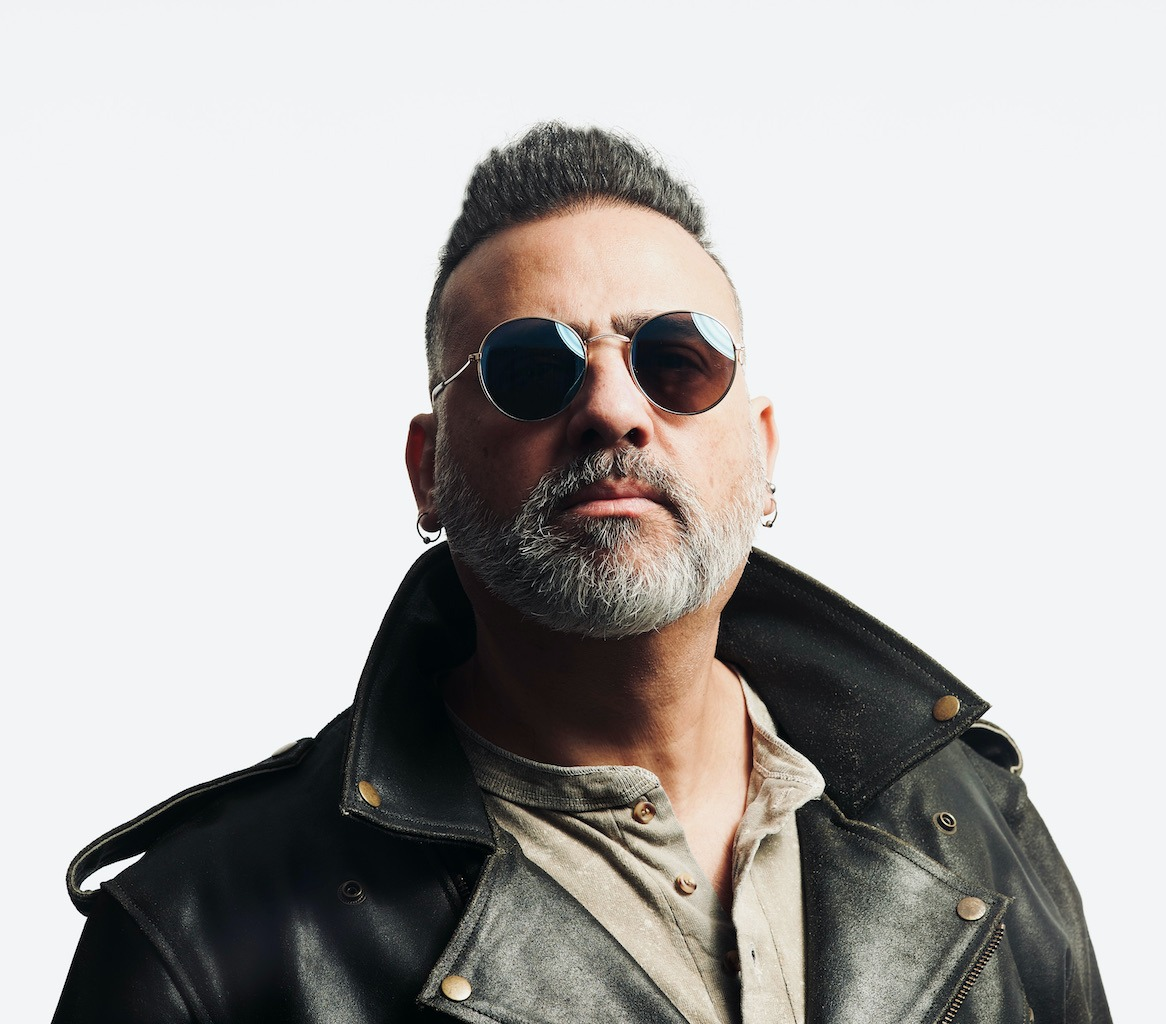

Background information
- Birth name: Paulo Jorge do Carmo Brissos
- Born: 19 May 1970 (age 54); Vila Franca de Xira, Portugal
- Genres: Rock, blues, pop, adult contemporary
- Occupation(s): Singer, songwriter, musician
- Instrument(s): Vocals, guitar
- Years active: 1993–present
- Labels: Movieplay, Universal, Espacial, Primetime
- Website: paulobrissos.com

Paulo Jorge do Carmo Brissos (born 19 May 1970) is a Portuguese singer.

== Biography ==
At the early age of 13, Paulo Brissos started to learn music at the Ateneu Artístico Vilafranquense amateur school, where he played clarinet in the band for a few years. Later, he taught himself to play the guitar and consequently began writing his own songs. In 1986, he began singing in bars in Lisbon and in 1991 he started his first steps as a resident singer on the TV shows ET and Sons do Sol. His first appearance as a singer for a large audience was at the Portuguese RTP song contest for the European Eurovision Song Contest in 1991 with the vocal group Blocco. In 1993, he went solo at the same contest with the song "No Dia Seguinte".

In 1994, he released his first album, People Amigo, and in 1997 signed a contract with the multinational Polygram and released his second album, Criação. This album provided two singles, "Criação" and "Serás Tu". The song "Serás Tu" was part of the soundtrack of the Portuguese television drama series Terra Mãe and is now part of the soundtrack of the drama series Sentimentos.

In 2001, he released the EP Sete e Meia and in 2003 the album Direitas, from which the single "Mulher Ideal" was part of the soundtrack for the television drama Olhar da Serpente.

Brissos produced the first records of Sergio Rossi and Paula Teixeira and as a songwriter wrote songs for Portuguese artists including Excesso, Sergio Rossi, Paula Teixeira, Adelaide Ferreira, and Ana Isabel Baptista. In 2007, Brissos graduated in music production at Valencia Community College and in 2009 released his first live CD/DVD, Concerto Acustico, on the Espacial label.

== Discography ==
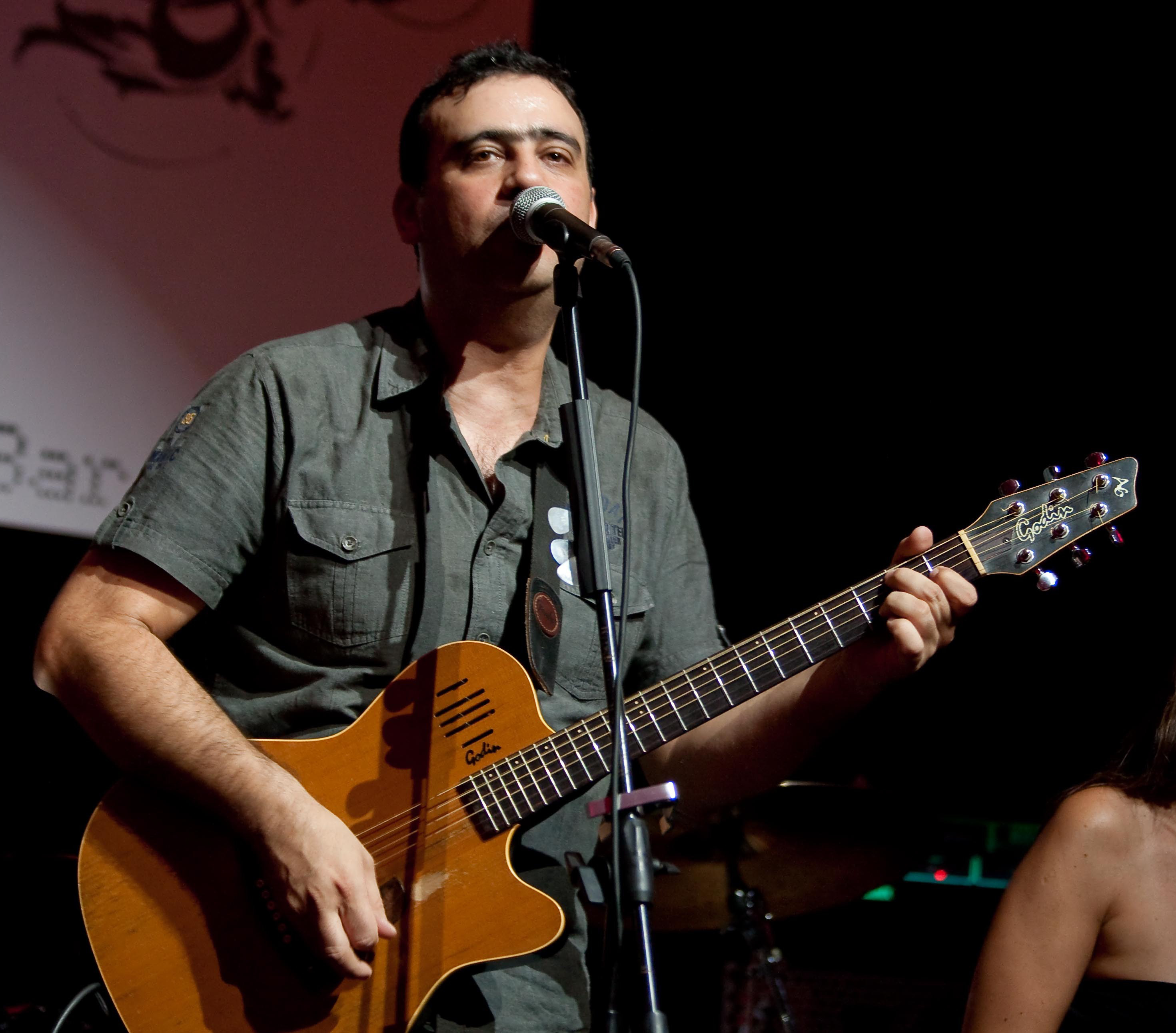
Brissos performing in 2009

- 1993 – Paulo Brissos EP – Movieplay
- 1994 – People Amigo (Friendly People) CD e K7 – Movieplay
- 1998 – Criação (Creation) CD – Polygram
- 2001 – Sete e Meia (7:30 pm) EP – Independent
- 2003 – Direitas (Straight Forward, also the name of a street and a bar in VFX) CD- Independent
- 2008 – Concerto Acústico (Acoustic Concert) CD/DVD – Espacial
- 2012 – Pop Blues – Espacial
- 2016 – Depois do Fim do Mundo CD/Vinil – Primetime

=== Singles ===
- 1993 – "No Dia Seguinte"
- 1994 – "People Amigo"
- 1998 – "Criação"
- 1998 – "Serás Tu"
- 2000 – "Curte de Verão" (Outthere Records)
- 2003 – "Mulher Ideal"
- 2008 – "Serás Tu" (Live)
- 2008 – "Sei Lá" (Live)
- 2009 – "Serás Tu" (New Version)
- 2010 – "Coração de Sereia"
- 2012 – "Todos os Teus Segredos"
- 2012 – "Sentimentos por Ti"
- 2013 – "Magenta"
- 2016 – "Tá Um Frio Que Não Se Pode"
- 2016 – "Sem Pensar em Nada"
- 2019 – "Coração Suspenso"

=== Compilations ===
- 1993 – As Melhores do Festival da Canção de 1993 (The best songs from the Portuguese RTP Song Contest 1993) – Movieplay
- 1995 – All You Need is Love 2 (All You Need is Love TV Show) – Somlivre
- 2002 – Os Novos Êxitos de Portugal (The New Successes From Portugal) – Polygram
- 2002 – Portugal no Coração (O Melhor do Pop/Rock vol. 1, 2 & 3) (Portugal in Your Heart (The Best Portuguese Pop/Rock Vol. 1,2 and 3)) – Universal Music
- 2002 – Portugal no Coração (As Melhores Baladas) (Portugal in Your Heart (The Best Ballads)) – Universal Music
- 2003 – Ana e os 7 (Soundtrack Anne and the 7) – Farol Música
- 2003 – O Melhor da TVI (The best from the TV Station TVI) – Farol Música
- 2005 – Vários – Rua do Carmo (Various – "Rua do Carmo") – Movieplay
- 2009 – Soundtrack Sentimentos (Soundtrack "Feelings") – Farol Música
- 2010 – Soundtrack Mar de Paixão (Soundtrack "Sea of Passion") – Farol Música
