= Ana Beatriz Silva =

Brazilian volleyball player (born 1992)

Personal information
- Full name: Ana Beatriz Silva Correia
- Nationality: Brazilian
- Born: 7 February 1992 (age 34)
- Height: 187 cm (74 in)
- Weight: 74 kg (163 lb)
- Spike: 290 cm (114 in)
- Block: 285 cm (112 in)

Volleyball information
- Position: middle blocker

National team
2010	Brazil

Ana Beatriz Silva Correia (born 7 February 1992) is a Brazilian female volleyball player, playing as a middle blocker. She was part of the Brazil women's national volleyball team.

She participated in the 2010 Women's Pan-American Volleyball Cup.
