= Ana Cristina Silva =

Portuguese psychologist and novelist

- Born: Vila Franca de Xira, Portugal
- Occupation: Psychologist
- Known for: As a novelist
- Notable work: Rei do Monte Brasil; A Noite não é Eterna
- Awards: Urbano Tavares Rodrigues award; Fernando Namora prize

Ana Cristina Silva is a Portuguese psychologist and university lecturer, specialising in early childhood reading and writing development. She is also a prize-winning novelist.

== Early training ==
Ana Cristina Conceição da Silva was born in 1964 in Vila Franca de Xira, just north of the Portuguese capital of Lisbon. She studied psychology at the University of Lisbon, where she obtained an undergraduate degree in psychotherapy and counselling in 1987. She then did a master's in educational psychology at the Instituto Universitário de Ciências Psicológicas, Sociais e da Vida in Alfama, Lisbon, now known as ISPA (Instituto Superior de Psicologia Aplicada). In 1999 she obtained a doctoral scholarship to study educational psychology at the University of Minho in Braga, obtaining her PhD in 2004 on the topic of children learning to read and write.

== Career ==
Silva is a professor at ISPA, teaching courses on the psychology of language. She is a visiting professor at the University of Minho. Following on from her doctorate, she researches in the field of cognitive psychology and early acquisition of written language and has published technical works in peer-reviewed journals on this topic.

== Writing ==
Silva published her first novel in 2002 entitled Mariana, Todas as Cartas (Marianna, All the Letters), and as of 2020 had published 14 novels. From 2008, when she published As Fogueiras da Inquisição (The Bonfires of the Inquisition), she began to concentrate on historical novels. She was given the Urbano Tavares Rodrigues award in 2012 for the novel Rei do Monte Brasil. She was shortlisted three times for the Fernando Namora prize before finally winning it in 2017 for A Noite Não é Eterna. Silva also contributes to newspapers, including the Portugal Post, a Portuguese-language newspaper published in Germany.

== Publications ==
=== Novels ===
Silva's novels are:

- Mariana, Todas as Cartas (2002)
- A Mulher Transparente (2003)
- Bela (2005)
- À Meia Luz (2006)
- As Fogueiras da Inquisição (2008)
- A Dama Negra da Ilha dos Escravos (2009)
- Crónica do Rei-Poeta Al- Um’Tamid (2010)
- Cartas Vermelhas (2010)
- Rei do Monte Brasil (2012)
- A Segunda Morte de Ana Carenina (2013)
- A Noite não é Eterna (2016)
- Salvação (2018)
- As Longas Noites de Caxias (2019)
- Rimbaud, o Viajante e o Seu Inferno (2020)

=== Technical papers ===
Silva's journal articles include:

- Silva, A.C., Peixoto, F., & Salvador, L. 2019. To give someone a fish or teach them how to fish?: effects of a self-reflection tool on orthographic performance in Portuguese children. Reading and Writing, 2021.
- Silva, A.C., Borges, S., Almeida, T. & Quintão, S. 2019. The impact of intervention programs for improving textual production in children of 4th grade. Analise Psicologica, 37-3
- Silva, A. C., Almeida, T., & Farroupas, S. (2016). The impact of revision and feedback on the quality of children's written compositions. International Journal of Social Sciences & Educational Studies, 3(2), 26–42.
- Alves Martins, M., Salvador, L., Albuquerque, A., & Silva, C. (2016). Invented spelling activities in small groups and early spelling and reading. Educational Psychology, 36(4), 738–752.
- Silva, C., & Almeida, T. (2015). Programas de intervenção de escritas Inventadas: comparação de uma abordagem transmissiva e construtivista. Psicologia: Reflexão e Crítica, 28(3), 613–622.
- Alves Martins, M., Albuquerque, A., Salvador, L., & Silva, C. (2013). The impact of invented spelling on early spelling and reading. Journal of Writing Research, 5(2), 215–237.
- Silva, C., Almeida, T., & Alves Martins, M. (2010). Letter names and sounds: their implications for the phonetisation process. Reading and Writing, 23(2), 147–172.
