= Cave of Pedra Furada =

Cave and archaeological site in Portugal

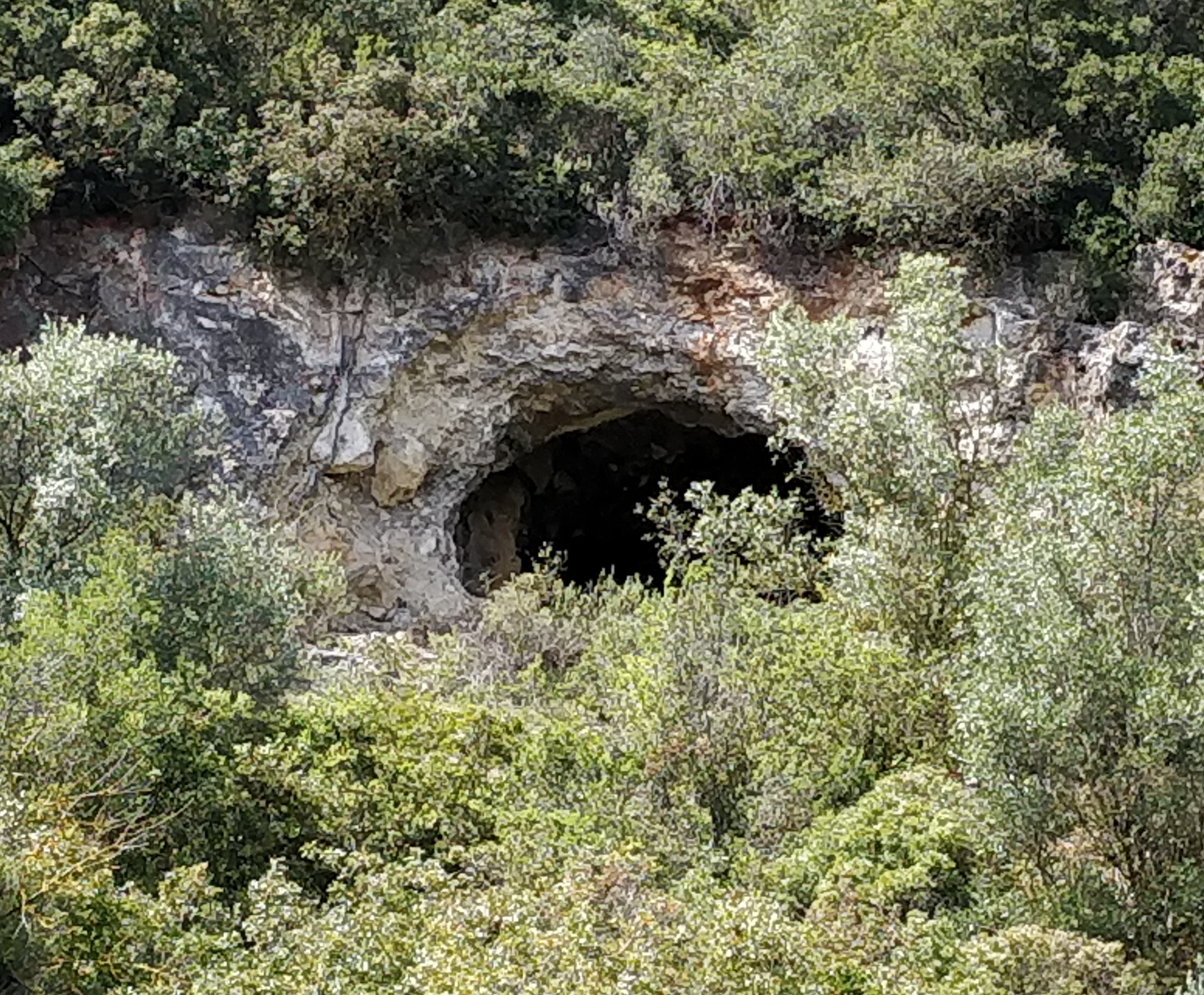
- Interactive map of Cave of Pedra Furada
- Location: Vila Franca de Xira, Lisbon District, Portugal
- Coordinates: 38°57′55″N 8°59′24″W
- Geology: limestone
- Difficulty: easy
- Access: Car and difficult 15 minute climb
- Lighting: no
- Visitors: free access

The Cave of Pedra Furada is a small cave located in the municipality of Vila Franca de Xira, about 20 km north of Lisbon in Portugal. Archaeological studies conducted within the cave suggest it was occupied intermittently by humans during at least three periods between the end of the fourth millennium BC and the second millennium BC. The cave results from karstification of the limestone Upper Jurassic Massif.

The first formal archaeological excavation was carried out in 1955 by a team led by Hipólito Cabaço. This identified a communal funeral space, and radiocarbon dating of one individual's bones indicates that the use of the cave as a necropolis dates back to between 3095 BC and 2915 BC. However, it is plausible the cave may have been used as a mortuary in later periods, as around 1200 bone and tooth fragments of a minimum of 34 individuals of both sexes have been identified.

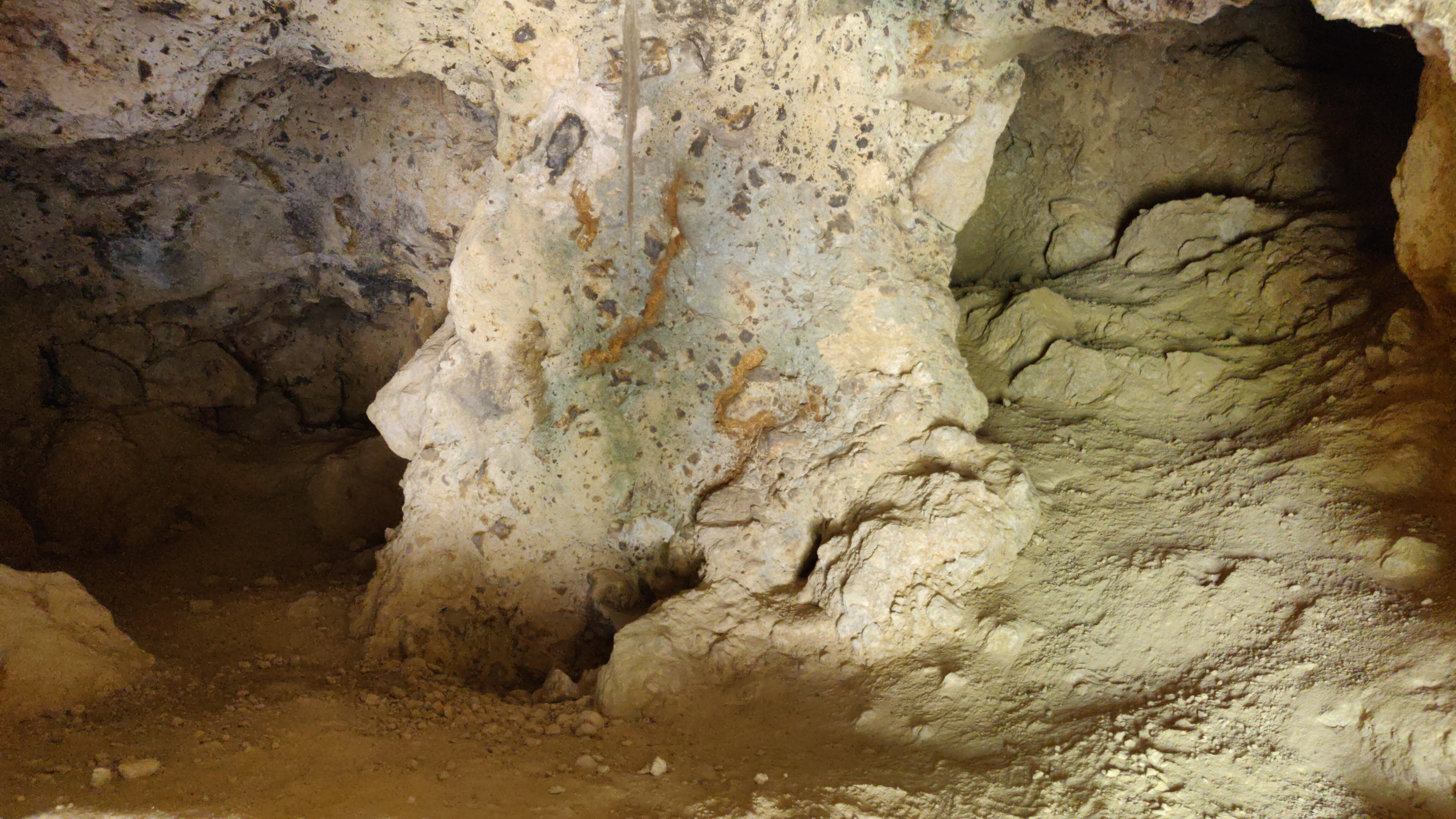
Inside the cave

Archaeologists also collected a number of objects, such as bone drills, beads of various materials, flint arrowheads, microliths, a polished stone axe, fragments of pottery and a bone figurine of a rabbit. Most of the items collected are now held in the Municipal Museum of Vila Franca de Xira and have been subjected to further analysis by Silva et al. The arrowheads are of a type consistent with those in use during the period when the cave is thought to have been first occupied while the pottery appears consistent with that in use elsewhere during the beaker culture.
