= Alverca do Ribatejo e Sobralinho =

Civil parish in Vila Franca de Xira, Portugal

- Civil parish
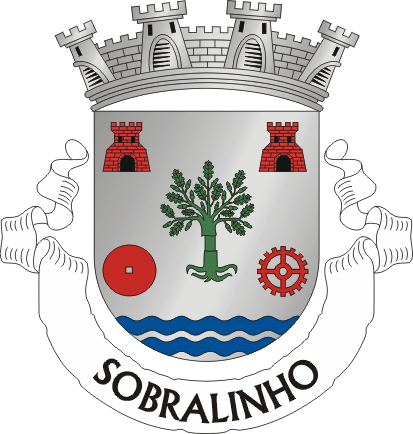
- Coat of arms

- Location in Portugal
- Coordinates: 38.901°N 9.038°W
- Country: Portugal
- Region: Lisbon
- Metropolitan area: Lisbon
- District: Lisbon
- Municipality: Vila Franca de Xira

Area
  - Total: 23.92 km^{2} (9.24 sq mi)

Population (2011)
  - Total: 36,120
  - Density: 1,500/km^{2} (3,900/sq mi)
- Time zone: UTC+00:00 (WET)
  - Summer (DST): UTC+01:00 (WEST)

Alverca do Ribatejo e Sobralinho is a civil parish in the municipality of Vila Franca de Xira, Portugal. It was formed in 2013 by the merger of the former parishes Alverca do Ribatejo and Sobralinho. The population in 2011 was 36,120, in an area of 23.92 km^{2}.
