= European route E1 in Portugal =

The European route E1 in Portugal is a series of roads, part of the International E-road network running on a north south axis on the west coast. It starts at the Spanish border in the north at Valença going almost perfectly south passing by several major Portuguese cities like Porto and Lisbon until the border with Spain again at Castro Marim.

== Route ==
The route starts at the border town of Valença at the Minho river coming from the Spanish city of Vigo in the Norte Region. It follows Portuguese highway A3 by Braga to the second largest city in Portugal Porto. From this coastal city on the Atlantic Ocean, the E1 goes southwest, using the A1 motorway to the Centro Region passing by the major cities of Coimbra and Leiria to the Portuguese capital Lisbon. The motorway passes through the city center, from where it takes the A2 motorway crossing the sparsely populated Alentejo Region all the way until the south coast in the Algarve region at the merge with the A22 motorway at Albufeira. The road goes then east passing by Faro to the Spanish border at the Guadiana river in the Portuguese village of Castro Marim. The E1 is one of the most important highways in Portugal as it connects several major cities north to south. The E1 covers a total distance of 748 km (465 mi) within Portugal.

== Detailed route ==
E1 Portugal
District	National road number	Section	Junction
(European Union) (Spain) (Galicia (Spain))	Autovía A-55	Spain towards Vigo and A Coruña	
(European Union) (Portugal) Norte Region Viana do Castelo	A3 motorway	Valença-Gaifar	15 N101 Valença, Monção, Melgaço 14 N13 Vila Nova de Cerveira, Viana do Castelo, Caminha 14 N13 Valença near São Pedro da Torre 13 N303 Paredes de Coura, Vila Nova de Cerveira 12 IC28, A27 Viana do Castelo, Ponte da Barca, Arcos de Valdevez 11 N203 Ponte de Lima, Viana do Castelo, Ponte da Barca 10 N201, N308 Vila Verde, Anais
Braga	A3 motorway	Gaifar-Vila Nova de Famalicão	Services of Barcelos 9 A11, N103 Braga West, Barcelos, Martim, Cabreiros, Esposende 8 A11, N14 Braga South, Guimarães, Celeirós 7 N14 Cruz, Braga, Vila Nova de Famalicão 6 A7 Guimarães, Vila Nova de Famalicão, Vila do Conde, Póvoa de Varzim, Fafe
Porto	A3 motorway	Vila Nova de Famalicão-Porto	5 N104 Santo Tirso, Trofa, Vila das Aves, Vila do Conde Services of Trofa 4 A41 CREP SUL Maia, Matosinhos, Porto Airport, Alfena near Maia 3 A4 Matosinhos, Ermesinde, Valongo, Vila Real, Bragança, Spain (Zamora) 2 N12 Matosinhos, Rio Tinto, Gondomar 1 A20 Porto, Vila Nova de Gaia
Porto	A20 motorway	Porto	Porto-Antas Porto-Areosa Campanhã railway station, Porto-S. Roque N12, N108 Porto-Freixo, Entre-os-Rios N12, A43 Gondomar A44 Vila Nova de Gaia, Oliveira do Douro N222 Vila Nova de Gaia A29 Espinho, Canelas, Porto A32 Oliveira de Azeméis, Olival, Pedroso, São João da Madeira
Porto	A1 motorway	Porto-Nogueira da Regedoura	A20 Porto, Gondomar, Braga, Vila Nova de Gaia, Viana do Castelo 20 N1 Vila Nova de Gaia 19 N1 Carvalhos 18B N1 Carvalhos, Grijó
(European Union) (Portugal) Centro Region Aveiro	A1 motorway	Nogueira da Regedoura-Ventosa do Bairro	near Nogueira da Regedoura A41 Espinho, Vila Real, Porto 18 N223 Santa Maria da Feira, São João da Madeira, Ovar 17 N109 Estarreja, Oliveira de Azeméis Services of Estarreja 16 A25 Aveiro, Viseu, Guarda, Spain (Salamanca, Madrid) 15 N235, N333 Aveiro, Águeda Services of Oiã
Coimbra	A1 motorway	Ventosa do Bairro-Murtede	14 N234 Mealhada, Cantanhede
Aveiro	A1 motorway	Murtede-Vendas de Santana	no junctions
Coimbra	A1 motorway	Vendas de Santana-Redinha	13 A14, IP3, E801 Montemor-o-Velho, Figueira da Foz, Viseu, Coimbra North 12 N341, A31 Coimbra South, Taveiro, Alfarelos 11 A13-1, A13 Lousã, Soure, Condeixa-a-Nova, Tomar
Leiria	A1 motorway	Redinha-Fátima	Services of Pombal 10 IC8 Pombal, Figueira da Foz 9 A8, N242 Leiria, Marinha Grande Services of Leiria
Santarém	A1 motorway	Fátima-Torres Novas	8 N356 Fátima, Batalha, Ourém near Vale Alto 7 A23 Abrantes, Castelo Branco, Torres Novas, Tomar, Guarda
(European Union) (Portugal) Alentejo Region Santarém	A1 motorway	Torres Novas-Aveiras de Cima	Services of Santarém 6A A15 Rio Maior, Caldas da Rainha 6 N114, A13 Santarém, Faro 5A N114-2 Cartaxo
(European Union) (Portugal) Lisbon Region Lisbon	A1 motorway	Aveiras de Cima-Lisbon	5 N366 Aveiras de Cima, Alcoentre, Rio Maior Services of Aveiras de Cima 4 N1 N3 Alenquer, Carregado 4 A10, A9, Arruda dos Vinhos, Benavente, Faro, Algarve Region Plataforma Logística de Lisboa Norte 3 N114, N4, N1 Évora, Elvas, Vila Franca de Xira 2A N10 Vila Franca de Xira, Alhandra 2 A9, A5, A10 Loures N116, N10 Alverca do Ribatejo, Bucelas near Alverca do Ribatejo 1A N115-5, A30 Santa Iria de Azóia, Vialonga 1 A36, A12, IC17 Vasco da Gama Bridge, Setúbal, 25 de Abril Bridge
(European Union) (Portugal) Lisbon Region Lisbon	2nd ring road	Lisbon	1 Olivais North, Parque das Nações, Sacavém, Portela, Moscavide Services of Olivais 2 Olivais South, Lisbon Airport (arrivals), Parque das Nações, Est. çao Oriente 3 Olivais South, Lisbon Airport (departures), Marvila, Areeiro Services of São João de Brito 4 Camarate, Charneca, Alvalade 5 Lisbon Center, Loures, Odivelas, Campo Grande, Marquês de Pombal 6 IP7, IC17 Eixos, Telheiras 6 IP7, A2 Eixos, Santa Maria Hospital, Lisbon Zoo, Lisbon South, Setúbal
(European Union) (Portugal) Lisbon Region Lisbon	IP7	Lisbon	Santa Maria Hospital, Estrada da Luz Entrecampos, Areeiro Lisbon Zoo, Campolide IC19, CRIL Algés, Sintra, Benfica Praça de Espanha A5, IC19 Cascais, Monsanto, Sintra
Setúbal	A2 motorway	Lisbon-Marateca	25 de Abril Bridge 1 A38, IC20 Caparica 1 A38, IC20 Almada Services of Amora 2 N378, N10 Sesimbra, Azeitão 2 N378, N10 Seixal, Fogueteiro 3 A33, IC21 Montijo, Barreiro near Coina Services of Palmela 4 N252 Palmela, Montijo, Setúbal, Pinhal Novo 5 A12 Setúbal 5 A12 Lisbon North, Montijo, Pinhal Novo 6 N10 Marateca, Pegões
(European Union) (Portugal) Alentejo Region Évora	A2 motorway	Marateca-Landeira	7 A6, A13 Santarém, Porto, Vendas Novas, Évora, Spain (Badajoz, Mérida)
Setúbal	A2 motorway	Landeira-Azinheira	Services of Alcácer do Sal 8 N5 Alcácer do Sal, Comporta, Montemor-o-Novo, Torrão 9 IC1, IC33 Sines, Grândola Services of Grândola 10 IP8 Beja, Ferreira do Alentejo
Beja	A2 motorway	Azinheira-São Barnabé	Services of Aljustrel 11 N261 Aljustrel, Santiago do Cacém 12 IP2, N123 Beja, Castro Verde, Ourique Services of Almodôvar 13 N393, N267 Almodôvar, Mértola
(European Union) (Portugal) Algarve Region Faro District	A2 motorway	São Barnabé-Albufeira	14 N124 Silves, São Bartolomeu de Messines, São Marcos da Serra, Alte near Paderne 15 A22 Portimão, Albufeira, Faro, Spain (Huelva, Seville)
(European Union) (Portugal) Algarve Region Faro District	A22 motorway	Albufeira-Castro Marim	11 N270 Boliqueime Services of Loulé 12 N396 Quarteira, 12 N396 Loulé Center 13 N125 Faro Airport 13 N125-4 Loulé South Parking near Faro West 14 N2 Faro Center, São Brás de Alportel Parking near Faro East 15 N398 Olhão, Santa Catarina da Fonte do Bispo Services of Olhão 16 N270 Tavira 17 N125 Monte Gordo 18 N122, IC27 Beja, Vila Real de Santo António, Castro Marim
(European Union) (Spain) (Andalusia)	Autovía A-49	Spain towards Huelva and Seville	

== General references ==
https://ec.europa.eu/transport/themes/infrastructure/

Google Maps
