= A9 motorway (Portugal) =

Tolled belt road around Lisbon, Portugal

Auto-estrada 9 - CREL: Circular Regional Exterior de Lisboa
- Outer Regional Circular of Lisbon

- The A9's Viaduct over the Loures Valley, near Pinheiro de Loures

Route information
- Maintained by Brisa (Grande Lisboa)
- Length: 35 km (22 mi)
- Existed: 1994–present
- History: 1994, opened 1995, completed

Major junctions
- SW end: Jamor, Oeiras
- - Estádio Nacional; - Queluz; - Belas; - Casal de Cambra; - Montemor, Loures; - Loures; - Bucelas
- NE end: Alverca do Ribatejo/ Alverca (//)

Location
- Country: Portugal

Highway system
- Roads in Portugal

The A9 (Auto-estrada 9) or CREL (Circular Regional Exterior de Lisboa, English: Lisbon Regional Outer Circular) is a tolled Portuguese motorway which forms a partial outer circular route beyond the north and western parts of the Lisbon conurbation. It thereby links the Estoril coastal area with principal radial highways of the Lisbon metropolitan area, as well as key motorways toward the west and north of the country.

Completed in 1995, it is currently concessioned to the Brisa Group as part of their Greater Lisbon contracts, its route is also classified as the IC18 (Itinerário Complementar 18).

== Route description ==
The road begins near to the National Stadium of Jamor and sets off in an approximately east-north-easterly direction, intersecting along the way with major regional roads (IC19, A16, IC22) as well as two national motorways, the A8 and the A10. It passes Queluz on the edge of the municipality of Sintra, then through the Amadora, Odivelas and Loures municipalities before ending after 35 kilometres (22 mi) at an intersection with the country's principal northbound highway, the A1. While the road continues straight on to the city of Alverca do Ribatejo, road signage recognises the northbound exit onto the A1 as the official ending of the CREL.

Despite running for its entire length within 20 kilometres (12 mi) of central Lisbon, much of the route of the A9 is semi-urban or rural, incorporating mountainous regions that necessitated the inclusion of 15 viaducts and two substantial tunnels in its construction. It therefore is a very hilly road, with several tight turns along its way.

== History ==
The most westerly four kilometres (2.5 mi) of the A9 were opened in 1994, with the remaining 31 kilometres (19 mi) opening in September 1995. There was an idea to extend the westerly portion of the ring highway southwards across an additional bridge, but extending the A9 in this way appears not to have evolved beyond the status of an ambitious line on the map, and a second major highway bridge crossing the Tagus to the east of Lisbon has been constructed in the interim. The A9 is operated by Portugal's principal highway operator Brisa. When opened, it was a tolled motorway, but they were abolished in December 1995 by the government of António Guterres. In January 2003 the Durão Barroso government re-introduced tolls, a decision which was controversial. As of 2012 the charge for a passenger car to travel the full 35 kilometres (22 mi) from one end of the road to the other is €2.95.

=== January 2010 ===
In the middle of the afternoon on 24 January 2010, near Belas, next to the junction with the newly opened the A16 a violent landslip deposited a large quantity of rocks and mud on the road. There is no record of any resulting road accident, but for more than a month the road was unusable and traffic had to be diverted, leading to serious congestion. Repairs were completed and the road fully repaired in time for it to be reopened on 25 February 2010.

== Route ==
Km	Exit number	Destinations	Exit road	Notes
0	0	Avenida Marginal (Lisbon, Algés/Cascais, Estoril)	EN6-3	
0	0	A5 Cascais toll, Lisbon; Queijas, Linda-a-Pastora	A5, Estrada Militar	Northbound
0	0	Caxias, Queijas	EN250	Southbound
0	1	A5 Lisbon estádio	A5	
4	2	IC19 Sintra, Amadora, Queluz	IC19	
4	Praça de Portagem de Queluz (toll)			
7	2A	A16 Sintra, Agualva-Cacém	A16	
7	South CREL service station (closed)			
8	Carenque Tunnel - Carenque Natural Monument			
10	3	IC16 Belas, IC17 - CRIL (Algés-Sacavém, Benfica)	IC16, EN250	
16	Montemor Tunnel			
17	4	EN250 Loures, Caneças; IC22 Odivelas	IC22	
17-19	Loures Valley Viaduct			
20	5	A8 Lisbon, Loures / Leiria, Malveira	A8	
22	North CREL service station			
24	6	EN115 Bucelas, Tojal; MARL	EN115	
32	7	A10 Benavente, Arruda; A1 NORTE	A10	
35	8	A1 Lisbon, Sacavém; A12 SUL (Vasco da Gama Bridge)	A1	
35	8	EN10 Alverca, Alhandra ( EN116 Bucelas, Vialonga)	EN10	
35	8	A1 NORTE Porto, V. Franca	A1	Official ending merges into A1
