= Autoroute 19 =

Autoroute 19 may refer to:

- A19 autoroute, in France
- Quebec Autoroute 19, in Quebec, Canada

== See also ==
- List of A19 roads
- List of highways numbered 19
