= Fabinho (footballer, born 1994) =

Portuguese footballer

Personal information
- Full name: Fábio Miguel Jesus Carvalho
- Date of birth: 21 December 1994 (age 31)
- Place of birth: Nogueira da Regedoura, Portugal
- Height: 1.80 m (5 ft 11 in)
- Position: Attacking midfielder

Team information
- Current team: Lusitânia
- Number: 27

Youth career
- 2003–2005: Porto
- 2005–2013: Feirense

Senior career*
Years	Team	Apps	(Gls)
2013–2017	Feirense	119	(18)
2018–2019	Famalicão	40	(3)
2019–2020	Oliveirense	23	(7)
2020–2021	Académica	30	(4)
2021–2025	Leixões	114	(9)
2025–	Lusitânia	25	(4)

International career
2014	Portugal U20	2	(0)
- * Club domestic league appearances and goals as of 23:12, 28 May 2026 (UTC)

Fábio Miguel Jesus Carvalho (born 21 December 1994), known as Fabinho, is a Portuguese professional footballer who plays as an attacking midfielder for Liga Portugal 2 club Lusitânia.

== Club career ==
Born in Nogueira da Regedoura, Santa Maria da Feira, Fabinho joined local club C.D. Feirense's youth system at the age of 10. He spent his first three seasons as a senior in the Segunda Liga, notably scoring ten goals in 41 matches in 2014–15 to help the team to the seventh position, notably from penalties.

Fabinho started in 29 of his 34 league appearances in the following campaign (two goals), as the side returned to the Primeira Liga after a four-year absence. He made his debut in the competition on 15 August 2016, featuring 77 minutes in the 2–0 away win against G.D. Estoril Praia. He scored the first of two top-division goals on 22 December, opening a 2–0 home victory over F.C. Paços de Ferreira through a penalty; Platiny closed it in the second half in the same fashion.

After leaving the Estádio Marcolino de Castro, Fabinho remained in the second tier, where he represented F.C. Famalicão (one and a half seasons), U.D. Oliveirense (one), Académica de Coimbra (one), Leixões SC (four) and Lusitânia FC.

== International career ==
Fabinho was part of the Portugal under-20 team at the 2014 Toulon Tournament.
