= Aveiras =

Aveiras may refer to:

- Aveiras de Baixo, civil parish in the municipality of Azambuja, situated in the district of Lisbon, Portugal
- Aveiras de Cima, civil parish in the municipality of Azambuja, situated in the district of Lisbon, Portugal
