= Benavente Municipality =

Benavente Municipality may refer to:

- Benavente, Portugal
- Benavente, Zamora, Spain
