= A10 motorway (Portugal) =

Road in Portugal

A10
- Autoestrada do Ribatejo

Route information
- Length: 39 km (24 mi)

Major junctions
- North-east end: Benavente
- South-west end: Arruda dos Vinhos

Location
- Country: Portugal

Highway system
- Roads in Portugal

The A10 (Autoestrada do Ribatejo) is a short Portuguese motorway to the north north-east of Lisbon, managed by Brisa.

It provides a relatively direct connection between the A9 (Lisbon Regional Outer Circular) at Junction 7 (Benavente), the A1 at Carregado and the A13 with which it links at Benavente.

The newest portion of the road, incorporating the Lezíria Bridge (Ponte da Lezíria), was opened in July 2007. The Ponte da Lezíria section comprises approximately 12 kilometres (7.5 miles) of bridges and viaducts across the lush marshland of the Ribatejo section of the Tagus estuary.

Together with the A13, the eastern portion of the A10 permits traffic traveling between the north and the south of Portugal to avoid both Lisbon and its conurbation, passing through primarily rural land to the east of the capital, thereby shortening the journey for drivers and reducing congestion in the urban zones.

== Route ==
Km	Exit number	Destinations	Exit road	Notes
0		A9 CREL Loures, Oeiras	A9	Collectively corresponds to junction no.7 of the A9-CREL
0	1	A9 CREL Alverca, A1 Lisbon (A12) SUL (Vasco da Gama bridge)	A9	Collectively corresponds to junction no.7 of the A9-CREL
2-3	Ribeira do Loureiro Viaduct			
3	Mato Forte Tunnel			
4	Rio da Silveira Viaduct			
6	Ribeira da Laje			
6	2	EN248-3 Arruda, Sobral	EN248-3	
7-8	Rio Grande da Pipa Viaduct			
12	Ribeira de São Sebastião			
13	Ribeira de Santana de Carnota Viaduct			(Also colloquially known as the Cadafais Viaduct)
17	4	A1 Porto, Carregado, Lisbon, Vila Franca; Plataforma Logística de Lisboa Norte	A1	
	Lezíria Bridge; Tagus and Sorraia rivers			
31	5	EN118 Benavente, Samora Correia, Porto Alto	EN118	
31	Praça de Portagem de Benavente (toll)			
39	6	A13 S.tº Estêvão, A2 ALGARVE; A6 Évora	A13	Corresponds to junction no.4 of the A13
39	6	A13 Santarém, Salvaterra	A13	Corresponds to junction no.4 of the A13
