= SR-19 =

SR-19 may refer to:

- A synthetic cannabinoid also known as BTM-4
- State Route 19
