= Lezíria Bridge =

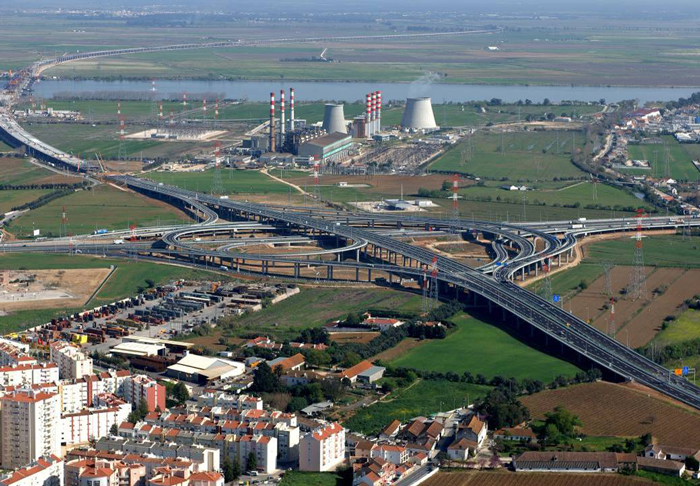
- Coordinates: 39.0125°N 8.933333°W
- Carries: Six road lanes of IC 11 - A 10
- Crosses: Tagus river
- Locale: Carregado, north of Lisbon (right bank); Municipality of Benavente (left bank)
- Official name: Ponte da Lezíria
- Maintained by: Brisa

Characteristics
- Design: box girder, viaducts
- Total length: 11,902 m
- Longest span: 133 m

History
- Construction start: 2005
- Construction end: 2007
- Opened: July 2007

Statistics
- Toll: €1.25 per passenger car (up to €3.10 per truck) northbound or southbound

The Lezíria Bridge (Portuguese: Ponte da Lezíria) is a box girder bridge flanked by viaducts and rangeviews that spans the Tagus river and the Sorraia River between Carregado and Benavente, north-east of Lisbon, capital of Portugal. It is the third-longest bridge in Europe (including viaducts) with a total length of 12 km. The main bridge spans 972 m over the Tagus and the Sorraia rivers. The span lengths are 95 m - 127 m - 133 m - 4 × 130 m - 95 m.

The bridge was constructed in 21 months using the balanced cantilever method and opened to traffic in July 2007.

== Description ==
The bridge carries six road lanes, with a speed limit of 120 km/h (75 mph), the same as motorways.

== See also ==
- 25 de Abril Bridge
- Vasco da Gama Bridge
- List of longest bridges
- Megaproject
