= List of highways numbered 19 =

Route 19, or Highway 19, may refer to:

For roads named "A19", see list of A19 roads.

== International ==
- Asian Highway 19
- European route E19
- European route E019

== Canada ==
- Alberta Highway 19
- British Columbia Highway 19
- Manitoba Highway 19
- Nova Scotia Trunk 19
- Ontario Highway 19
- Route 19 (Prince Edward Island)
- Quebec Autoroute 19
- Saskatchewan Highway 19

== Czech Republic ==
- I/19 Highway (Czech Republic)

== Finland ==
- Finnish national road 19

== Germany ==
- Bundesautobahn 19

== Greece ==
- EO19 road (formerly the EO18 until 1995)

== Hungary ==
- M19 expressway (Hungary)

== India ==
- National Highway 19 (India)

== Iran ==
- Road 19

== Ireland ==
- N19 road (Ireland)

== Italy ==
- Autostrada A19

== Japan ==
- Japan National Route 19
- Chūō Expressway
- Nagano Expressway

== Korea, South ==
- Guri–Pocheon Expressway (abolished and changed to Sejong–Pocheon Expressway)
- National Route 19

== Malaysia ==
- Sungai Besi–Ulu Klang Elevated Expressway
- FT 19 Malaysia Federal Route 19/AMJ Highway

== Mexico ==
- Mexican Federal Highway 19

== Morocco ==
- National Route

== New Zealand ==
- State Highway 19 (New Zealand)

== Paraguay ==
- National Route 19

== Portugal ==
- A 19 A19 motorway

== United Kingdom ==
- British A19 (Doncaster-Seaton Burn)

== United States ==
- Interstate 19
  - Interstate 19 Business
- U.S. Route 19
  - U.S. Route 19W
  - U.S. Route 19E
- Alabama State Route 19
  - County Route 19 (Lee County, Alabama)
- Arkansas Highway 19
- California State Route 19
  - County route A19 (California)
  - County Route E19 (California)
  - County Route G19 (California)
  - County Route J19 (California)
  - County Route S19 (California)
- Connecticut Route 19
- Florida State Road 19
- Georgia State Route 19
- Hawaii Route 19
- Idaho State Highway 19
- Illinois Route 19
- Indiana State Road 19
- K-19 (Kansas highway)
- Kentucky Route 19
- Louisiana Highway 19
  - Louisiana State Route 19
- Maryland Route 19
  - Maryland Route 19B (former)
- Massachusetts Route 19
- M-19 (Michigan highway)
- Minnesota State Highway 19
  - County Road 19 (Chisago County, Minnesota)
  - County Road 19 (Ramsey County, Minnesota)
  - County Road 19 (Washington County, Minnesota)
- Mississippi Highway 19
- Missouri Route 19
- Montana Highway 19
- Nebraska Highway 19
  - Nebraska Spur 19B
  - Nebraska Spur 19C
- Nevada State Route 19 (former)
- New Jersey Route 19
- New Mexico State Road 19
- New York State Route 19
  - County Route 19 (Allegany County, New York)
  - County Route 19 (Chenango County, New York)
  - County Route 19 (Columbia County, New York)
  - County Route 19 (Dutchess County, New York)
  - County Route 19 (Franklin County, New York)
  - County Route 19 (Genesee County, New York)
  - County Route 19 (Lewis County, New York)
  - County Route 19 (Niagara County, New York)
  - County Route 19 (Orange County, New York)
  - County Route 19 (Otsego County, New York)
  - County Route 19 (Rensselaer County, New York)
  - County Route 19 (Schoharie County, New York)
  - County Route 19 (Suffolk County, New York)
  - County Route 19 (Sullivan County, New York)
  - County Route 19 (Ulster County, New York)
  - County Route 19 (Warren County, New York)
  - County Route 19 (Wyoming County, New York)
- North Carolina Highway 19 (former)
- North Dakota Highway 19
- Ohio State Route 19
- Oklahoma State Highway 19
  - Oklahoma State Highway 19C
  - Oklahoma State Highway 19D
- Oregon Route 19
- Pennsylvania Route 19 (former)
- South Carolina Highway 19
- South Dakota Highway 19
- Tennessee State Route 19
- Texas State Highway 19
  - Texas State Highway Loop 19
  - Farm to Market Road 19
  - Texas Park Road 19
- Utah State Route 19
- Virginia State Route 19 (former)
- Washington State Route 19
- Wisconsin Highway 19

Territories

- Puerto Rico Highway 19

== Vietnam ==
- National Route 19

== Zambia ==
- M19 road (Zambia)

== See also ==
- List of A19 roads
- List of highways numbered 19A

Preceded by 18	Lists of highways 19	Succeeded by 20
