= Odete da Cruz e Silva =

Portuguese neuroscientist

- Born: July 26, 1960 (age 66); Benavente, Portugal
- Education: University of Dundee (Ph.D., 1989)
- Known for: Research into Alzheimer's disease
- Awards: Calouste Gulbenkian Foundation Stimulus for Research Prize; Angelini Award
- Scientific career
- Fields: Neuroscience, Cell biology
- Workplaces: University of Aveiro; Rockefeller University

Odete da Cruz e Silva (born 1960) is a Portuguese neuroscientist. She is a full professor of biomedical sciences at Aveiro University in Portugal where she was also director of the Medical Sciences Department. She has published or co-published over 200 articles on neuroscience and on illnesses such as Alzheimer's disease.

== Early life and education ==
Cruz e Silva was born as Odete Abreu Beirão on 26 July 1960 in Samora Correia, a parish in the Benavente municipality in the Santarém District of Portugal. She went to primary school in Samora Correia before her family moved to England when she was ten where, after further primary education, she attended the Maria Fidelis convent school in London. She obtained a bachelor's degree in biological sciences, specialising in molecular and cell biology, from the University of Essex in 1984 and a PhD in biochemistry and molecular biology from the University of Dundee in Scotland in 1989. In 1984, she married Edgar Figueiredo da Cruz e Silva, who worked in the same technical area as her and with whom she had two sons. Her husband died from cancer in 2010.

== Career ==
Between 1990 and 1995 both she and her husband worked at the Rockefeller University, a private biomedical research and graduate-only university in New York City. They then returned to Portugal to establish the Centre for Cellular Biology (CBC) in the University of Aveiro. She became head of the Neuroscience and Signalling Group of the centre, with her research including working with a group of 600 volunteers from the Aveiro region who participated in cognitive tests and donated biological fluids.

Her research focused on the molecular basis of neuropathologies such as Alzheimer's disease, Parkinson's disease and Torsion dystonia. She employed a systems biology approach to unravel protein interactomes, and identified several novel protein binding partners that revealed novel functional multimeric complexes. The work of Cruz e Silva and her colleagues described a curious distribution of APP (Alzheimer's precursor protein) in sperm. Other areas of research included stem cell-based prognostics and therapeutics and neuronal regeneration. Cruz e Silva has been involved in five European Projects and 17 national projects.

Between 2010 and 2015 she was the director of the Centre for Cell Biology of Aveiro University and between 2015 and 2018 director of the biomedicine PhD Programme. From 2019 to 2024 she was director of the university's Medical Services Department.

== Publications ==
Cruz e Silva has published over 200 publications on her own or as co-author. She has been associate editor of the Journal of Alzheimer's Disease, a member of the editorial board of Neurodegeneration and review editor of Frontiers in Aging Neuroscience and Advances in Biology.

== Awards ==
Her work has been recognized with an award from the Astra Zeneca Foundation and she received the Gulbenkian Prize for stimulating research. In 2011, she was responsible for a project that created a support platform for caregivers and family members of Alzheimer's patients, which was awarded the Angelini University Award in 2011.
