= List of A19 roads =

This is a list of roads designated A19. Roads are sorted in the countries' alphabetical order.

- A019 road (Argentina), a beltway around Córdoba
- A-19 expressway (Canada), a road in Quebec connecting the borough of Ahuntsic-Cartierville in Montreal and the Duvernay neighbourhood in Laval
- A19 road (England), a road connecting Doncaster, Yorkshire and Tyneside
- A19 motorway (France), a road connecting the A5 and the A6 between Sens, Yonne and Courtenay, Loiret
- A 19 motorway (Germany), a road connecting Rostock and the A 24
- A19 motorway (Italy), a road connecting Palermo and Catania
- A19 motorway (Portugal)
- A-19 motorway (Spain), a road connecting Barcelona and Palafolls
- A 19 road (Sri Lanka), a road connecting Polgahawela and Kegalle
- A19 road (Tanzania), a road connecting Mbamba Bay to Mtwara
- A19 road (United States of America) may refer to:
  - A19 road (California), a road connecting SR 299 and SR 89

== See also ==
- List of highways numbered 19
