= Première! =

Studio album by Qwentin
- Released: November 15, 2007
- Recorded: 2006–2007 at Ultra Sound Studios, Braga, Portugal
- Genre: Alternative rock
- Length: 44:25
- Label: Raging Planet Records
- Producer: Daniel Cardoso

Professional ratings
Review scores
Source	Rating
Destak (Portugal)	4/5 stars
Maxmen (Portugal)	4/5 stars

Première! is the debut album by Portuguese alternative rock band Qwentin, released on November 15, 2007 on Raging Planet Records.

== Track listing ==
1. "¡Fatalidad!"
2. "Casualty Friday"
3. "Il Commence Ici"
4. "trailer de “Aqui.”"
5. "Uomo-Tutto"
6. "Jornalisma"
7. "intervalo"
8. "Tweestrijd"
9. "N.F.O. Kronikoj"
10. "Aqui."
11. "Mind (the) Thieves"
12. "Terrier"
13. "Chewbacca’s Blues" (bonus hidden track)

== Songs ==
=== ¡Fatalidad! ===
The album's first song was, curiously, the last one written. Sung in Spanish, it reflects on the frailty of life, comparing it to an island "completely surrounded by death" ("somos solamente islas, pequeñas porciones de vida rodeadas de muerte por todos lados". These reflections are conveyed through the point of view of a fictional character who recalls everything that came to his mind while nearly drowning.

=== Casualty Friday ===
Although it appears before "Mind (the) Thieves" (track #11), it is a sequel of it, as one might notice through the opening riff. The lyrics are in English.

=== Il Commence Ici ===
The album's first single, "Il Commence Ici", is spoken in French. The main theme is the concept of reality, as an ever-changing element of life ("le monde qu'on voit tous les jours quand on se réveille est sujet à des constantes mutations, transformations, déformations" - "the world that we see everyday, when we wake up, undergoes constant mutations, transformations, deformations").

=== trailer de "Aqui." ===
This song is merely an excerpt of the song "Aqui.", as a teaser (track #10).

=== Uomo-Tutto ===
A song in Italian based on a fictional character which is, simultaneously, God and Man.

=== Jornalisma ===
Sung and spoken in Portuguese, "Jornalisma" talks about truth and the manipulation of facts in the media.

=== intervalo ===
The word "Intervalo", in Portuguese, means "Intermission" (as in a movie theatre). This instrumental theme works as a breather between the record's two halves.

=== Tweestrijd ===
A deeply existentialist song about a woman becoming a man through some sort of metamorphosis. Sung in Dutch.

=== N.F.O. Kronikoj ===
A fast-paced Esperanto-spoken song which talks about truth and contradiction, the main topic being UFOs ("NFO" stands for "Nekonata Fluigi Objekto", in Esperanto; i.e., "U.F.O.").

=== Aqui. ===
The record's second (and last) song in Portuguese. The lyrics talk about the unbearable weight of routine on a couple's day-to-day life.

=== Mind (the) Thieves ===
The record's second (and last) song in English. And the first to be written. Its lyrics tell the story of a mind thief, through the POV of its victim. The story continues on Casualty Friday (#2), where the narrative is conducted through the thief's POV.

=== Terrier ===
An instrumental piece with dark, funeral march-like ambience. With some background references to the Bosnian War.

=== Chewbacca's Blues ===
An instrumental unlisted track (although it is credited on the sleeve notes) which is, according to Qwentin (as said on an interview for the Portuguese radio station Antena 3, in 2006), a "deep look into the character's inner self" (Chewbacca being a Star Wars supporting character, with little or no closure on its personal life).

== Personnel ==
- Gospodar Qwentinsson – guitar, vocals, piano
- Qweon Qwentinsson – guitar, vocals
- Drepopoulos Qwentinsson – bass
- Bárány Qwentinsson – drums
- Morloch Qwentinsson - piano, keyboards, sequencing
- Daniel Cardoso– producer, additional drums on "Terrier"
- Rui Duarte – vocals on "Mind (the) Thieves
- Zé Gato – trumpet on "intervalo"
- Pedro Mendes – assistant engineer, additional guitars on "Mind (the) Thieves"
- Mathilde Baron – spoken voice on "Il Commence Ici"
- Giorgia Zaga – spoken voice on "Uomo-Tutto"
- Sara Romanin – spoken voice on "Uomo-Tutto"
- João Mestre – spoken voice on "Jornalisma"
- Gonçalo Brito – spoken voice on "Jornalisma"
- Tiago Abreu – spoken voice on "Jornalisma"
- Bonnie Hendriks – spoken voice on "Tweestrijd"
- Dominique Borde – additional engineering on "Il Commence Ici", "Uomo-Tutto", "Jornalisma", "N.F.O. Kronikoj" and "Chewbacca's Blues"
- Ary – additional engineering on "Il Commence Ici", "Uomo-Tutto", "Jornalisma", "N.F.O. Kronikoj" and "Chewbacca's Blues"
- Jonatan Sousa - additional engineering on "Tweestrijd"
- Pedro Lourenço - additional engineering on "Tweestrijd"
