= A19 motorway (Portugal) =

Road in Portugal

A19
- Batalha Bypass; Portuguese: Variante da Batalha

Route information
- Maintained by Auto-estradas do Litoral Oeste S.A.
- Length: 16.4 km (10.2 mi)
- Existed: 2010–11–present

Major junctions
- South end: São Jorge (IC9 / N1 / N8)
- J5 → A8
- North end: North Leiria (N109)

Location
- Country: Portugal
- Districts: Leiria district

Highway system
- Roads in Portugal

A19, also known as Batalha bypass, is a motorway in Portugal connecting São Jorge (junction between IC9, N1 and N8) to the same N1 in South Leiria and extending further to the junction with N109 in North Leiria. The motorway is 16.4 km long and was built in two phases. The section between South Leiria and North Leiria was completed in 2010 and resulted from the enlargement of the existing IC2/N1 single carriageway expressway. On the other hand, the section between São Jorge and South Leiria (the actual Batalha bypass) was a newly built section and was completed in 2011. A19 is partly a toll road: the section from South Leiria to North Leiria (the Leiria bypass) is toll-free, as it was built over an existing road, while the section between São Jorge and South Leiria has tolls. Legally, A19 is an integral part of the complementary route IC 2.

The construction of this motorway was not included in the 2000 National Road Plan: in this region, such document supported the construction of IC2 as single carriageway expressway, not as a motorway. As such, it was initially planned that the numbering A19 would be given to a short motorway that would link A8 (in South Leiria) to A1 (in East Leiria). (Note: This road section, between South Leiria and A1 (in East Leiria) was completed in 2011 and was included in A8 motorway.) Nevertheless, since 1999 there was the intent to convert into a dual carriageway the section of IC2 expressway that bypasses the city of Leiria. However, south of Leiria, what eventually was built as A19, was originally planned to be a bypass included in IC2 expressway (as such, not a motorway) to the area of Batalha: in this area, N1 road not only crosses the interior of several built-up areas as it also passes in the vicinity of the Batalha Monastery, damaging the structure of the building.

In 2007, the Portuguese government decided to move forward with the enlargement of IC2 in Leiria and with the construction of Batalha bypass. However, the government decided to build Batalha bypass as toll motorway, instead as a (toll free) single carriageway expressway (as it was planned in the 2000 National Road Plan). It was decided to give the numbering A19 to the motorway that would thus born. Jointly with other roads and motorways, A19 was included in the 30-year Litoral Oeste sub-concession, which was given in 2009 to the private company Auto-estradas do Litoral Oeste, S.A..

Although nowadays, an average of 10,900 vehicles travel each day on A19, in practice this motorway consists of two very distinct sections in terms of traffic levels. In 2017, the toll-free section (between South Leiria and North Leiria) had an average daily traffic between 34,300 (Note: The section between South Leiria (A8) and CIL registered 34,389 vehicles per day in January 2017.) and 50,400 vehicles (Note: The section between Barosa (N242) and Gândara (N109) registered 50,401 vehicles per day in November 2017.). On the other hand, the tolled section (the Batalha bypass proper) has been registering traffic levels below expectation. In 2017, this section of A19 had an average daily traffic between 3,700 (Note: The section between São Jorge (IC9) and Batalha registered 3,719 vehicles per day in January 2017.) and 5,300 (Note: The section between Batalha and Azóia registered 5,377 vehicles per day in November 2017.). In 2016 the sum of the toll revenues collected in A19 and in the last section of A8 were nearly €3 million, which allowed the Portuguese government to cover 2% of the expenditures it had on that year with Litoral Oeste sub-concession.

== Route and connections ==
Exit Number	Exit Name	Connecting Roads
	Tomar - Fátima	IC 9
2	Alcobaça; Caldas da Rainha Lisbon; Rio Maior; Porto de Mós / São Jorge	N 8 N 1
Batalha toll gantry - € 0,55
3	Batalha; Martingança	N 356
Azóia toll gantry - € 0,60
4	Azóia; Maceira	N 1 N 356–1
5	Lisbon; Marinha Grande; Leiria (East); A 1 - A 17	A 8
6	Leiria (South) commercial centre	CIL
7	Leiria (West); Marinha Grande	N 242
8	Leiria (North); Figueira da Foz / Monte Real	N 109
	towards Porto; Coimbra; Pombal	N 1

== See also ==
- Roads in Portugal
