= Qwentin =

Portuguese rock band

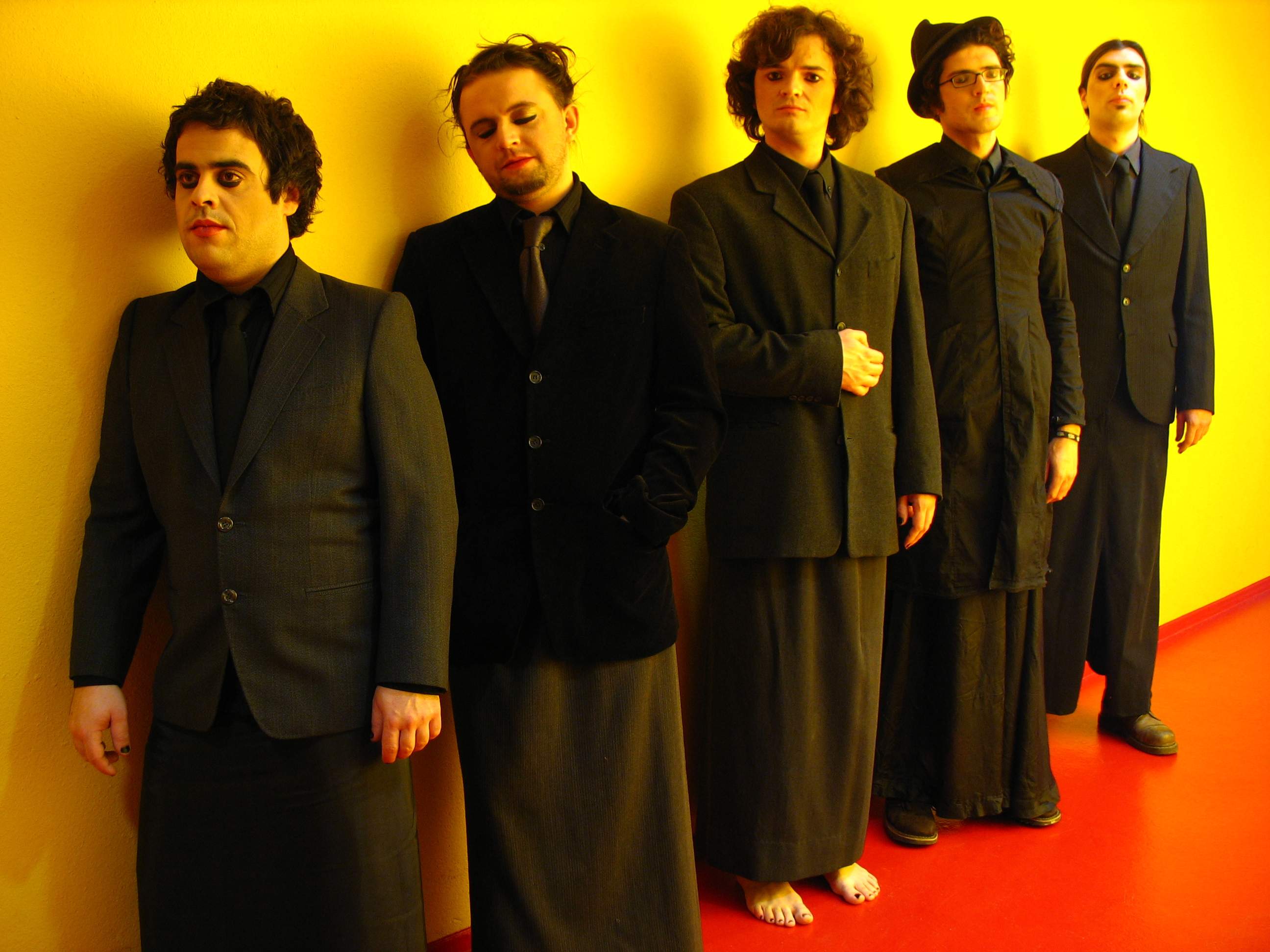
- Left to right: Drepopoulos, Qweon, Gospodar, Bárány, Morloch.

Background information
- Origin: Cartaxo, Portugal
- Genres: Alternative rock
- Years active: 2003 – present
- Labels: Raging Planet (PT)
- Members: Drepopoulos Qwentinsson; Qweon Qwentinsson; Gospodar Qwentinsson; Bárány Qwentinsson; Morloch Qwentinsson
- Past members: Vjlasson Qwentinsson; Qartafla Qwentinsson
- Website: qwentin.com

Qwentin is a Portuguese rock band formed in Cartaxo in 2003. It consists of Drepopoulos Qwentinsson (bass guitar), Gospodar Qwentinsson (guitar, vocals), Morloch Qwentinsson (samples, keyboards), Qweon Qwentinsson (guitar, vocals) and Bárány Qwentinsson (drums). Qwentin has a prominent visual component to accompany their music. On stage, they appear with make-up, black ties and long skirts, always with a dark theatrical theme.

== History ==
Their music is marked with a worldwide atmosphere and cinematographic influences, based on the multiplicity of languages and on the creation of stories that evolve as movies. Assuming themselves as a European band, as confirmed by themselves in an interview to the newspaper “O Mirante”, Qwentin was formed in Cartaxo and had their premiere in Festival Tejo – a summer festival dedicated to Portuguese bands from all steps of the stairway of success. In July 2003, Drepopoulos (bass), Gospodar (guitar, vocals), Morloch (samples, keyboards), Qweon (guitar, vocals) and Vjlasson (drums) Qwentinsson performed on a minor stage at Festival Tejo in Azambuja.

In April 2004, Qwentin won the AZB002 battle of the bands (provided by the Azambuja town hall), which granted them the presence on the New Talents Stage on Festival Tejo’s 2004 Edition, held in Valada – where they shared the stage with bands like Zen, Fonzie, Ramp or Mão Morta. This brought on the first reviews from the Portuguese press: “astonishment”, “amazement” and “mystery”, were some of the words chosen to classify the enduring rising of Qwentin’s world. Their performance has been described as "challenging", and their sound a "progressive mutation with Zeppelin", yet difficult to label. "Qwentin don’t do anything of what is expected, and there lies their merit."

In the beginning of 2005, Qwentin's first EP, Il Commence Ici, was recorded in Toolateman Studios with Dominique Borde and Ary (Blasted Mechanism) in charge of the production. The presentation took place in a bar then known as “Touro Louco”, in Cartaxo, before a crowded house of one hundred people.

Shortly after, Vjlasson left the band and Qartafla Qwentinsson took his place on drums. Then, a period of several live performances took place, passing through Almeirim, Azambuja, Entroncamento (with Blind Zero), Esposende, Lisbon (Santiago Alquimista), Nazaré (with Blister), Santarém and Viseu. During this tour, Qwentin returned to Toolateman Studios, again with Dominique and Ary has producers, to record the Uomo-Tutto EP. The EP includes new versions of “Il Commence Ici”, “Jornalisma” and “NFO Kronikoj”, and two new songs: “Uomo-Tutto” and “Chewbacca’s Blues”.

In summer 2005, Qwentin was invited by the promoter Código 365 to perform at the Blitz Stage in what was to be the last edition of Festival Tejo. Meanwhile, they produced their first video clip for the song “Il Commence Ici”, directed by Ricardo Leal Pereira. In October, they were invited by the Cartaxo Town Hall and Antena 3 Radio for a live interview on the radio station’s morning show, Manhãs da 3.

The first months of 2006 were dedicated to the creation of Homem Tudo (“Whole Man”), a show involving video, theatrical performance and music. It premiered on April 15 in Centro Cultural do Cartaxo (CCC) with the contributions of actor Tiago Graça Nogueira and director Ricardo Leal Pereira. During rehearsals for the show, Qartafla left the band and Bárány Qwentinsson took his place. After the success of this show, Qwentin returned to CCC in September for a presentation of a less theatrical nature, was also presented later in Portalegre during “Games 2006”.

By October 2006, the band decided to put the live acts on hold to record their first album, Première!, released on November 15, 2007. The record was produced by Daniel Cardoso (Head Control System, Del) at Ultra Sound Studios in Braga. The album has twelve songs interpreted in Castilian, English, Portuguese, French, Italian, Dutch and Esperanto.

== Discography ==
- Il Commence Ici EP (2004)
- Uomo-Tutto EP (2005)
- Première! (2007)

== Line-up ==
Year	Band					Title
Year	Bass	Guitar, Vocals	Guitar, Vocals	Samples, Keyboards	Drums	Title
2003	Drepopoulos Qwentinsson	Gospodar Qwentinsson	Qweon Qwentinsson	Morloch Qwentinsson	Vjlasson Qwentinsson	Curta-Metragem Demo
2004	Drepopoulos Qwentinsson	Gospodar Qwentinsson	Qweon Qwentinsson	Morloch Qwentinsson	Vjlasson Qwentinsson	Il Commence Ici EP
2005	Drepopoulos Qwentinsson	Gospodar Qwentinsson	Qweon Qwentinsson	Morloch Qwentinsson	Qartafla Qwentinsson	Uomo-Tutto EP
2006	Drepopoulos Qwentinsson	Gospodar Qwentinsson	Qweon Qwentinsson	Morloch Qwentinsson	Bárány Qwentinsson	Première!
