= Cartaxo =

- Municipality
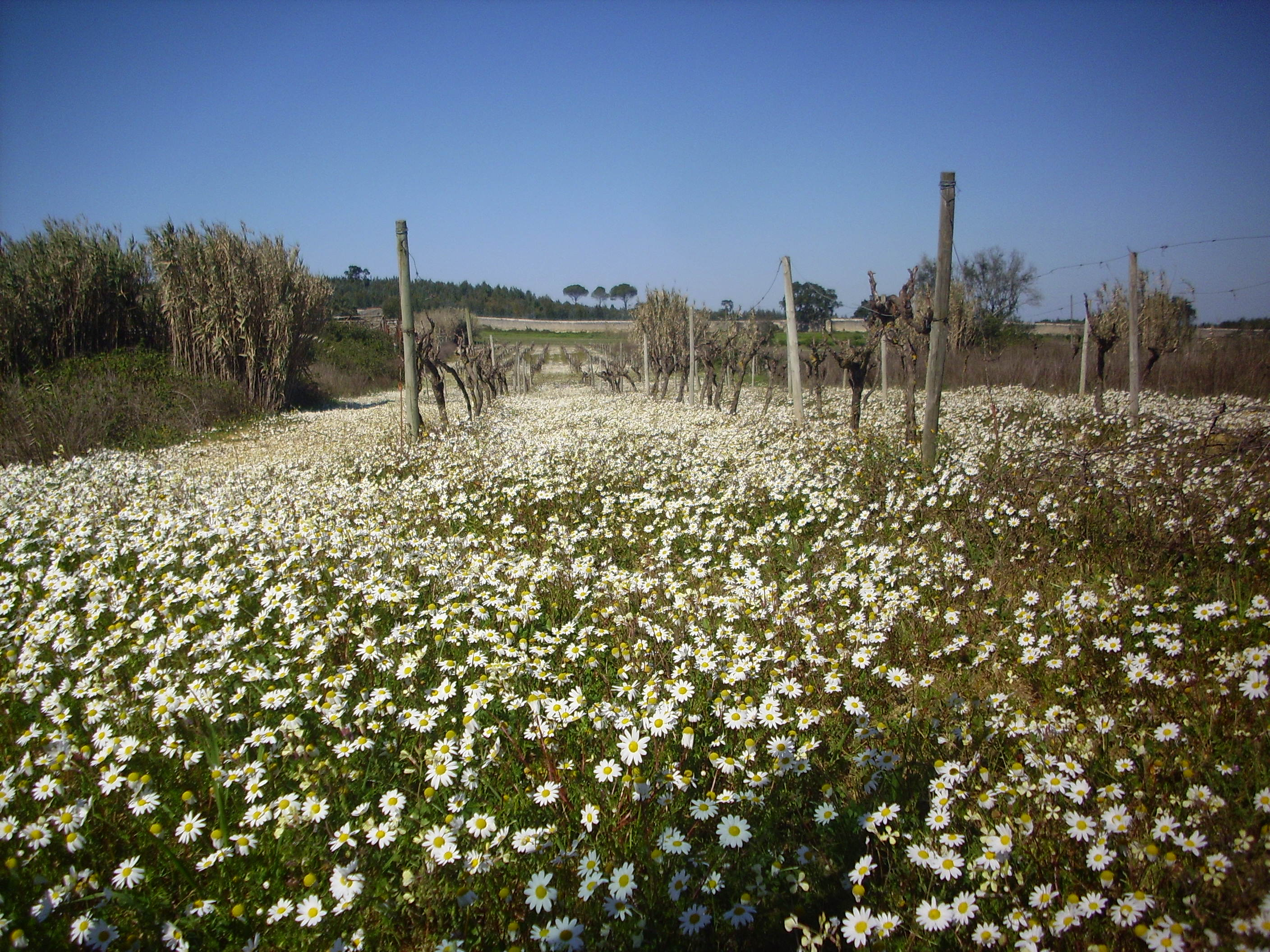
- View of Cartaxo

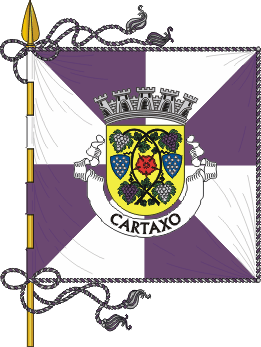
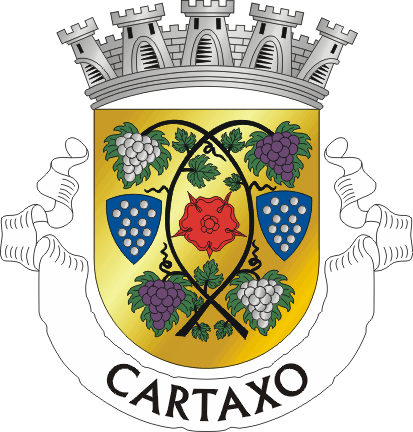
- Flag Coat of arms
- Interactive map of Cartaxo
- Location in Portugal
- Coordinates: 39°9′N 8°47′W
- Country: Portugal
- Region: Oeste e Vale do Tejo
- Intermunic. comm.: Lezíria do Tejo
- District: Santarém
- Parishes: 6

Government
  - President: Pedro Ribeiro (PS)

Area
  - Total: 158.17 km^{2} (61.07 sq mi)

Population (2011)
  - Total: 24,462
  - Density: 154.66/km^{2} (400.56/sq mi)
- Time zone: UTC+00:00 (WET)
  - Summer (DST): UTC+01:00 (WEST)
- Area code: 243
- Website: http://www.cm-cartaxo.pt

Cartaxo (Portuguese pronunciation: [kɐɾˈtaʃu]) is a municipality in the district of Santarém in continental Portugal. The population in 2011 was 24,462, in an area of 158.17 km^{2}. The urbanized centre of Cartaxo had a population of 9,507 in 2001.

== History ==
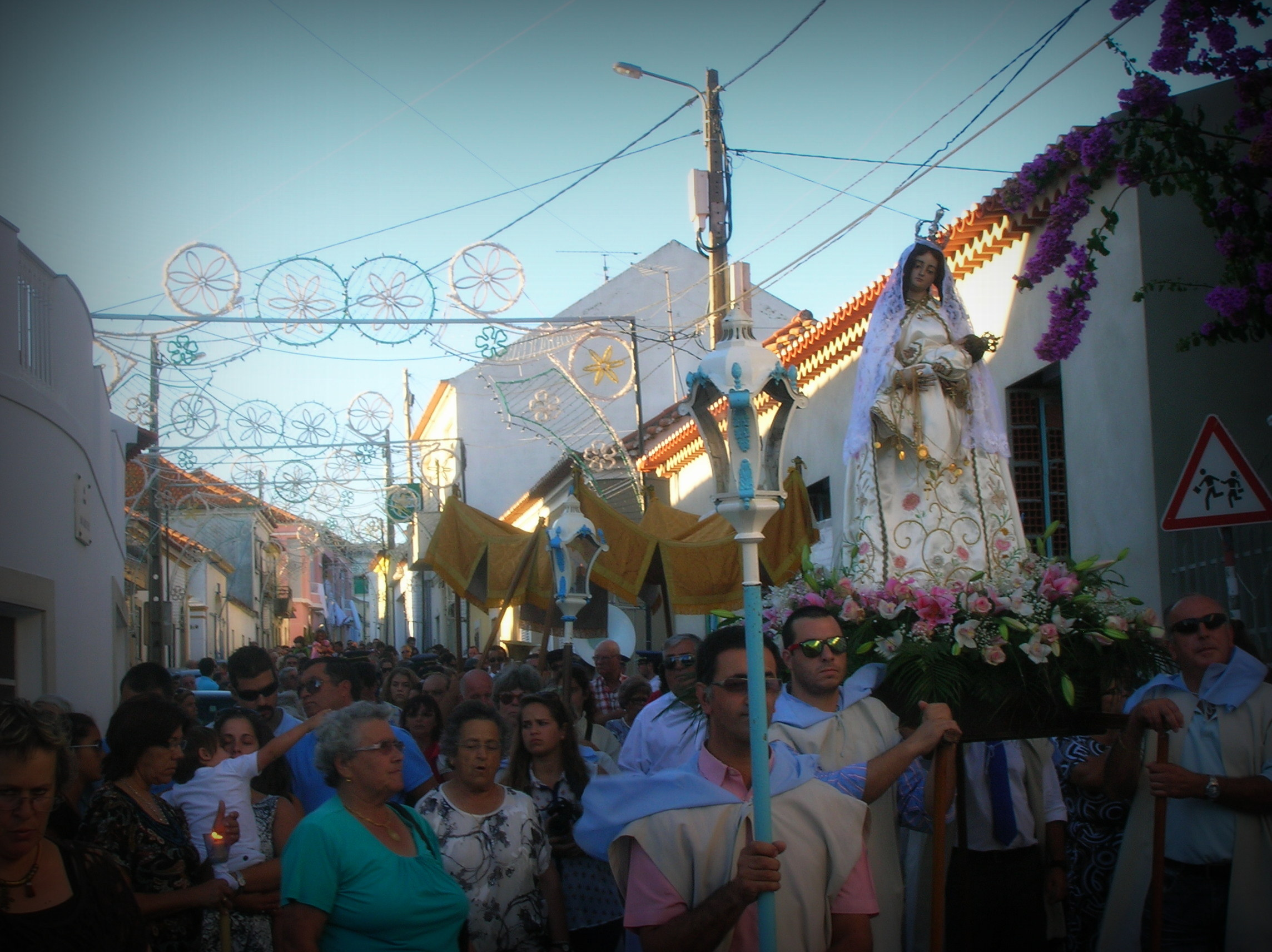
The religious procession during the festival of Nossa Senhora da Graça

In written and oral history, the territory of Cartaxo was an important point in the interior of the country. A Roman road, crossing Alenquer (Lerabriga), connected ancient Olissipo (Lisbon) to Santarém (Scallabis) through the territory of Cartaxo. Yet, before the Romans, other civilizations settled in the region, establishing castros in Vila Nova de São Pedro, Vale do Tejo or in the areas of Muge.

Situated in the plains of the Ribatejo, Cartaxo was a battleground between Muslim and the Christians. Due to its proximity to Santarém, it was one of the centres disputed between Muslim and Christian forces for years, resulting in the destruction of Cartaxo. King Sancho II of Portugal found it necessary to repopulate the area, since it was located in a privileged position with fertile lands. He, therefore, assigned the land of Cartaxinho (today Ribeira do Cartaxo) to Pedro Pacheco, who was responsible for constructing a shelter for the poor, a task that neither Pedro Pacheco nor his descendants would accomplish.

Oral tradition suggests that the name Cartaxo was given to the lands by Queen Elizabeth of Portugal who, on a journey to the Monastery of Almoster, stopped to rest and quench her thirst. Alongside a spring, she was surprised by the beautiful song of an unfamiliar bird. Asking one of the peasants about the songbird, the serf responded that the song came from a bird of the kind called cartaxos or cartaxinhos. Enchanted by the place, the Queen ordered that the land, then called Lugar da Fonte, receive the name Lugar do Cartaxo. It is unclear whether there is any truth to this story.

In 1312, Cartaxo received its first foral (charter), signed in Leiria by King Dinis of Portugal, confirmed in 1487 by King John II (in Santarém), and in 1496 by Manuel (also in Santarém). The first foral, issued by Dinis on 21 March 1312, was sent to his vassal, Garcia Martins, originating the foundation of the locality of Cartaxo. In this act, Dinis exempted the region from taxes for those who grew and cultivated grapes during the first five years of their tenure. Settlers who accepted these land rights were required in return to present each year an eighth of their produce in wine and linen.

The historical importance of the municipality is supported by events of the Battle of Ourique, which were probably linked to Vila Chã de Ourique (1139), a concession of foral to Pontével, by King Sancho (1194) and the existence of the Royal Palaces of Valada (1361–1365).

In the middle of the 19th century, Cartaxo was one of the more populated areas of Estremadura, in the Comarca of Santarém, with just over 200 inhabitants. On the death of King John IV of Portugal, his testament granted several "honours" to his daughter (in 1656). On 10 December 1815, by royal decree from Rio de Janeiro, King John VI granted it administrative independence, followed up on 21 June 1995 with its elevation to the status of city.

At the end of the 19th century, owing to the growth of technological innovations, Cartaxo became the centre of production of the typical wine of the Valley of the Tejo, much of which was sent by ship to Lisbon.

== Geography ==
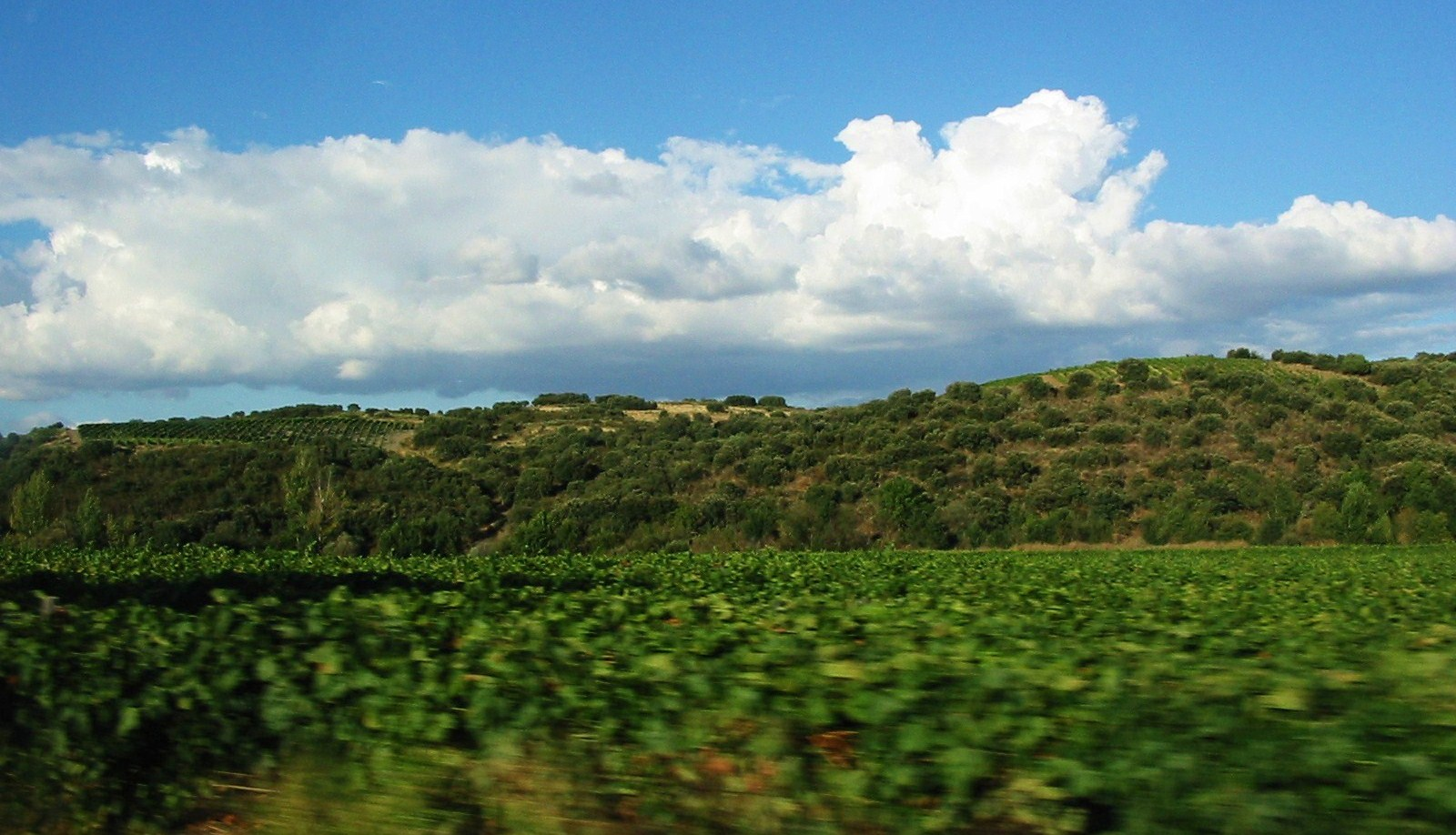
The scenic landscape of the Tagus valley near the town of Cartaxo

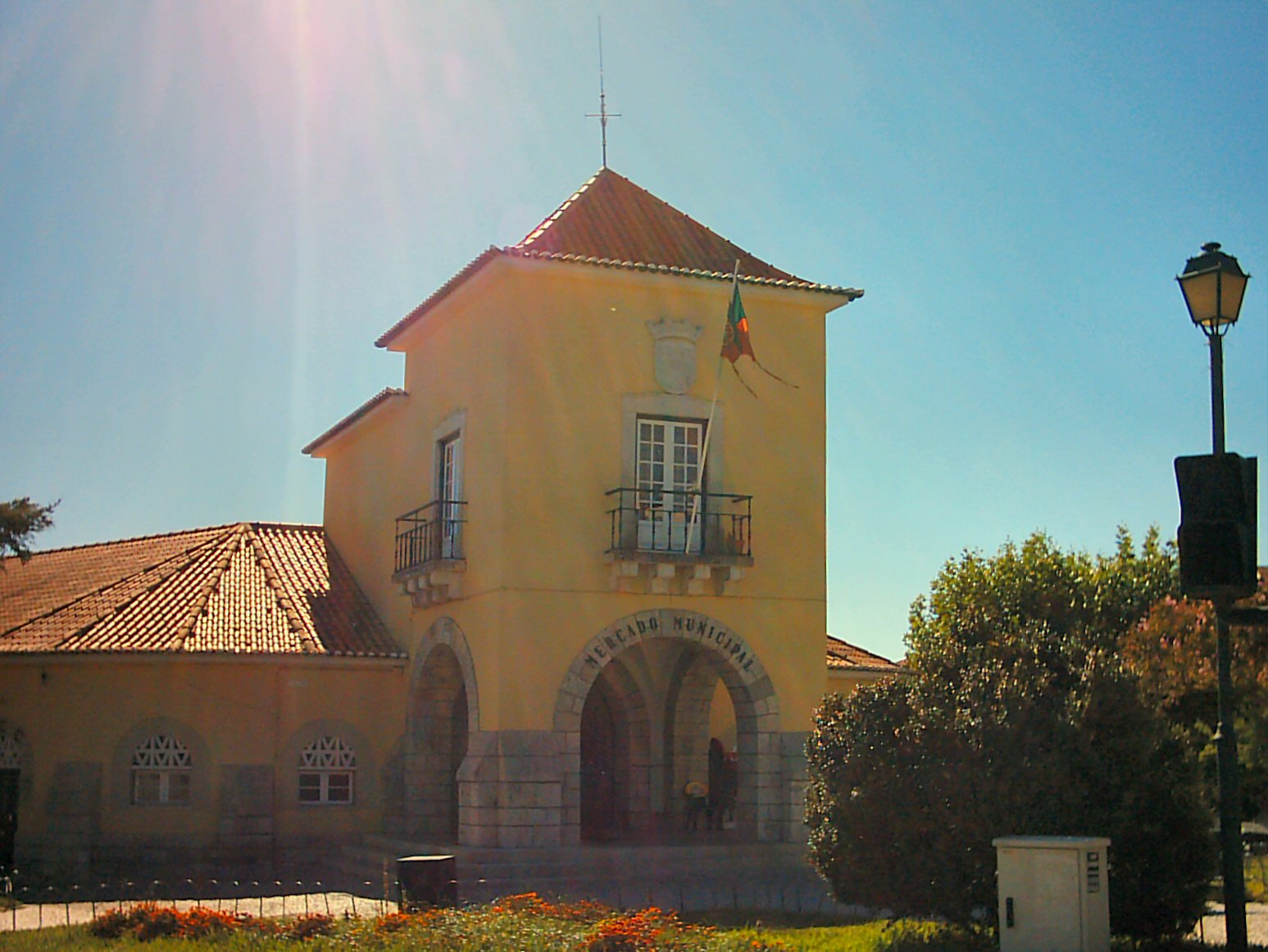
The historical municipal market, still an integral part of the municipality

=== Physical geography ===
Cartaxo is located 50 kilometres (31 mi) from Lisbon (its airport is the primary international gateway), and 15 kilometres (9.3 mi) from the district capital, Santarém, served by many roadways and rail-lines. Direct access by the A1 motorway, its variant the Estrada Nacional E.N. 365–2, to the intersection of the A1 at Aveiras de Cima, also the E.N.3, that crosses the municipality, connecting the area between Carregado and Santarém.

The fields, town and flat-lands, with the river at their feet, make Cartaxo a rich landscape. The municipality is marked by agricultural fields, primarily vineyards, that occupy a large portion of the land. Vine cultivation and wine production has always been linked to the municipality, earning it the title Wine Capital of the Ribatejo.

=== Human geography ===
Situated in the heart of the Ribatejo, the municipality of Cartaxo occupies an area of approximately 160 square kilometres (62 mi^{2}), comprised from the civil parishes of Cartaxo, Ereira, Lapa, Pontével, Valada, Vale da Pedra, Vale da Pinta and Vila Chã de Ourique.

Administratively, the municipality is divided into 6 civil parishes (freguesias):

- Cartaxo e Vale da Pinta
- Ereira e Lapa
- Pontével
- Valada
- Vale da Pedra
- Vila Chã de Ourique

The municipality is served by the Linha Ferroviária do Norte, with the station at Setil, the most important: it is part of the national rail network connection between the north and south. The rail stations in Santana and Reguengo are also points of departure and ingress to Cartaxo, permitting a level of regional mobility.

==== Twin towns — Sister cities ====
Cartaxo is twinned with:

- Słupsk, Poland.

== Architecture ==
=== Civic ===
- Assembly House of Cartaxo (Portuguese: Casa da Assembleia)
- Bandstand of Cartaxo (Portuguese: Coreto do Cartaxo)
- Bandstand of Pontével (Portuguese: Coreto de Pontével)
- Cartaxo Market (Portuguese: Mercado do Cartaxo)
- Casa do Povo de Pontével (Portuguese: Casa do Povo de Pontével)
- Commemorative Pillory of Pontével (Portuguese: Padrão Comemorativo do Foral de Pontével)
- Fountain of Concha (Portuguese: Fonte da Concha/Fontanário da Saramaga)
- Hospital of the Misericórdia of Cartaxo (Portuguese: Hospital da Misericórdia do Cartaxo)
- Lime Kiln of São Gens (Portuguese: Forno de Cal de São Gens)
- Medieval Bridge of Pontével (Portuguese: Ponte Medieval de Pontével)
- Municipal Culture Centre of Cartaxo (Portuguese: Cine-Teatro Municipal do Cartaxo/Cine-Ribatejo/Centro Cultural Município do Cartaxo)
- Palace of Chavões (Portuguese: Palácio dos Chavões e Capela de Nossa Senhora das Angústias), sold at the end of the 14th century, the estate of Chavões was left in the will of Lourenço Gonçalves to the Church of Santo Estevão, in Santarém; since the middle of the 15th century it passed hands between various proprietors. By the beginning of the 17th century, it was purchased by Rui Telles de Menezes, Count of Unhão who constructed the "U-Shaped", classic Mannerist Palace, similar to the Palácio da Quinta das Torres, in Setúbal;
- Pontével Market (Portuguese: Mercado de Pontével)
- Residence of the Countess of Pontével (Portuguese: Casa da Condessa de Pontével)
- Residence of the Camelo Family (Portuguese: Casa da Família Camelo/Casa no Largo do Coreto)
- Residence of Dr. Egas de Azevedo (Portuguese: Casa do Dr. Egas de Azevedo)
- Seniors Home of São João (Portuguese: Lar de São João/Lar da Santa Casa da Misericórdia)
- Well of São Bartolomeu (Portuguese: Poço de São Bartolomeu)

=== Religious ===
- Chapel of Nossa Senhora do Desterro (Portuguese: Capela de Nossa Senhora do Desterro)
- Chapel of Santo Cristo (Portuguese: Capela do Santo Cristo)
- Chapel of Senhor dos Passos (Portuguese: Capela do Senhor dos Passos)
- Church of Nossa Senhora da Expectação (Portuguese: Igreja Paroquial de Valada/Igreja de Nossa Senhora da Expectação)
- Church of Nossa Senhora da Purificação (Portuguese: Igreja Paroquial de Pontével/Igreja de Nossa Senhora da Purificação)
- Church of São Bartolomeu (Portuguese: Igreja Paroquial de Vale da Pinta/Igreja de São Bartolomeu)
- Church of São João Baptista (Portuguese: Igreja Paroquial do Cartaxo/Igreja de São João Baptista)
- Church of the Espírito Santo (Portuguese: Igreja Paroquial da Ereira/Igreja do Espírito Santo)
- Cross of Cartaxo (Portuguese: Cruzeiro de Cartaxo)

== Notable citizens ==
- Cosme Delgado (c.1530 in Cartaxo – 1596) a Portuguese Renaissance composer.
- Marco Chagas (born 1956 in Pontével) a retired professional cyclist, four-time winner of the Volta a Portugal
- Qwentin (formed in 2003 in Cartaxo ) an alternative rock band

== See also ==
- Cartaxo IPR
