= Auto-Estradas do Atlântico =

Auto-Estradas do Atlântico, Concessões Rodoviárias de Portugal, S.A., is a highway management concessionaire in Portugal.

== Network ==
Auto-Estradas do Atlântico operates two highways:

- A8, from Lisbon to Leiria via Caldas da Rainha
- A15 from Santarém to Óbidos and Caldas da Rainha via Rio Maior
