= List of highways numbered 19A =

The following highways are numbered 19A:

== Canada ==
- British Columbia Highway 19A
- Prince Edward Island Route 19A

== China ==
- Taiwan Provincial Highway 19A

== India ==
- Karnataka State Highway 19A

== United States ==
- Florida State Road A19A (former)
  - County Road 19A (Lake County, Florida)
- Maryland Route 19A
  - Maryland Route 19A (1951–1962) (former)
- County Road 19A (Washington County, Minnesota)
- Nebraska Spur 19A
- New York State Route 19A
  - County Route 19A (Allegany County, New York)
  - County Route 19A (Genesee County, New York)
  - County Route 19A (Schoharie County, New York)
  - County Route 19A (Suffolk County, New York)
- South Dakota Highway 19A
