= Carenque Natural Monument =

Protected area in Portugal

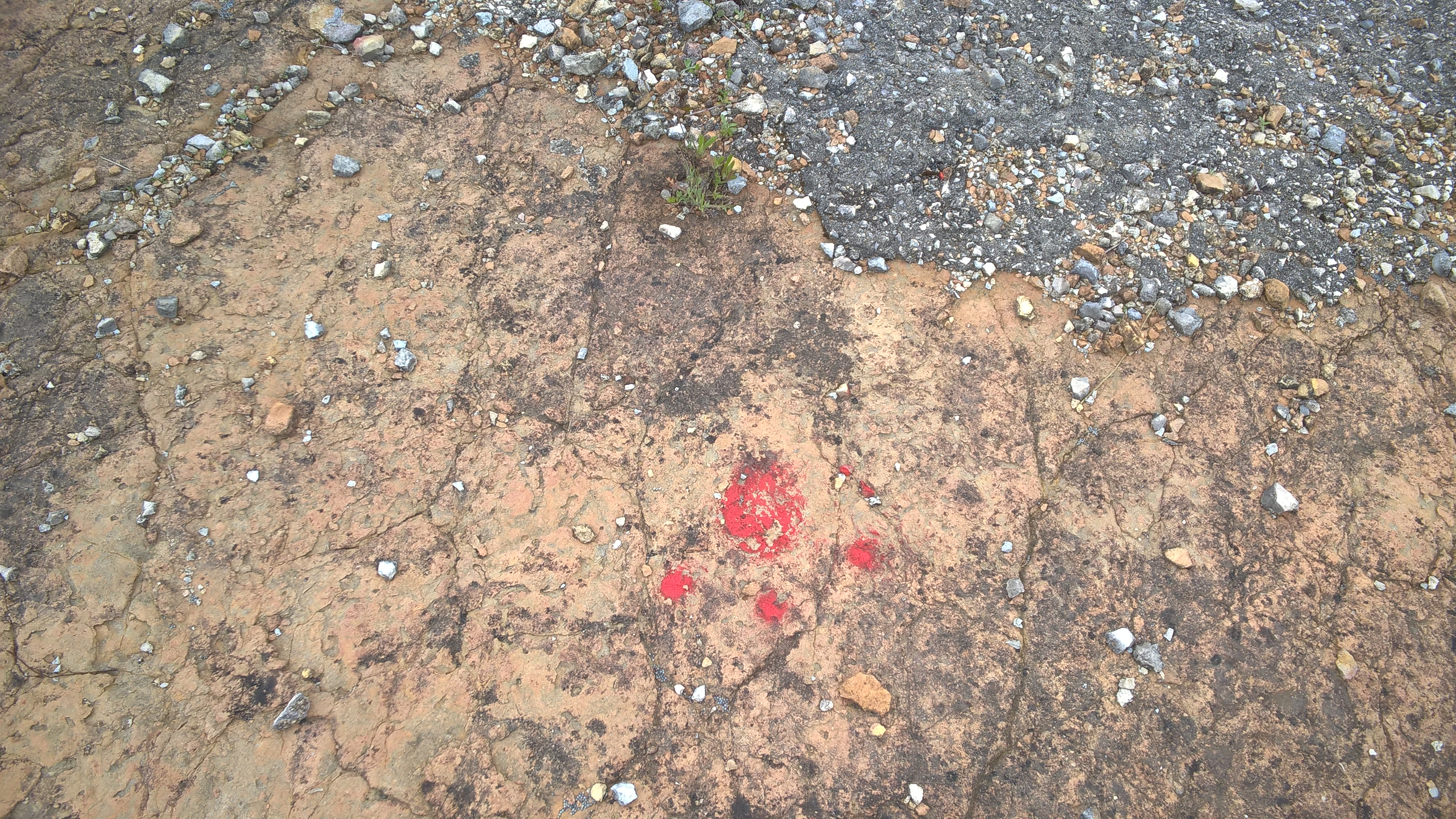
- Dinosaur footprint
- Interactive map of Carenque Natural Monument
- Location: Carenque, Belas (Sintra)
- Nearest city: Queluz (Portugal)
- Area: 6.09 ha (15.0 acres)
- Established: 5 May 1997
- Governing body: Institute for Nature Conservation and Forests

The Carenque Natural Monument is a fossil site of dinosaur footprints located in the parish of Belas in the municipality of Sintra, Portugal. It was designated as a natural monument in 1997 by Decree No. 19/97 of May 5. The site features a 120-meter-long trackway with hundreds of dinosaur footprints, including those of quadrupedal herbivores and tridactyl ichnites.

== Background ==
The site was discovered in 1986 by Carlos Coke and Paulo Branquinho, students of Galopim de Carvalho, in a disused quarry 1 km southeast of Belas. It is situated in a thin layer of Late Cretaceous (Middle Cenomanian) limestone, estimated to be 90 to 95 million years old, containing the fossil record of over a hundred footprints of two quadrupedal herbivores and possibly bipedal carnivores. Galopim de Carvalho organized a public campaign and petition to prevent the destruction of the footprints, which were located on a site where the government, led by Aníbal Cavaco Silva, planned to construct the CREL (A9) highway. The highway was eventually rerouted through a tunnel beneath the footprint site.

In 2001, the Sintra City Council, then led by Edite Estrela, proposed a museum and interpretation center for the site, but the project did not materialize.

In 2021, following a legal action by Galopim de Carvalho, the Sintra City Council and the Institute for Nature Conservation and Forests were ordered by the Administrative and Tax Court of Sintra to clean and maintain the site, including placing signage to prevent littering and controlling access. The Sintra City Council, led by Basílio Horta, argued that responsibility for the site lay with the State and the landowner, agreeing to request the landowner to clean the site and to undertake cleaning if the landowner failed to comply. The Institute for Nature Conservation and Forests advocated for a "realistic solution" that considered the monument's "educational potential".

The monument is currently closed to visitors, as the footprints have been molded in latex and covered with sediment for protection.
