= A8 motorway (Portugal) =

Road in Portugal

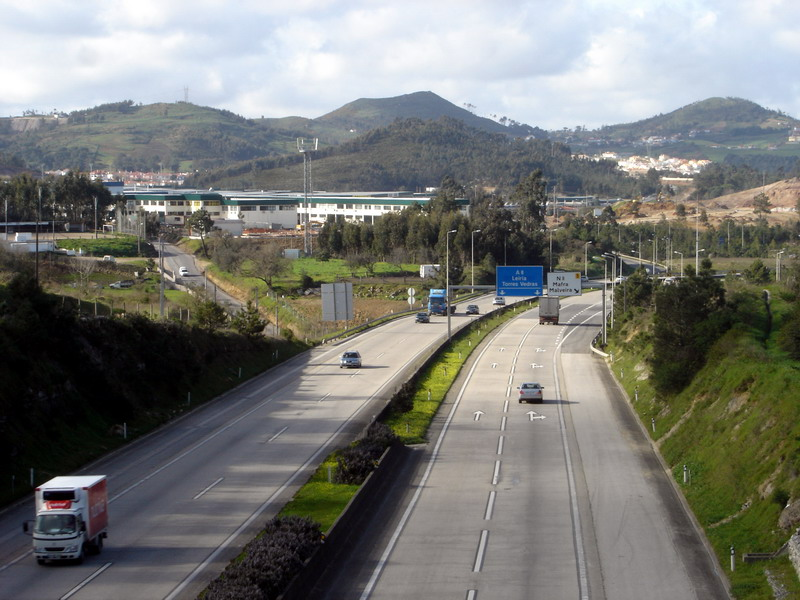
A8 near Malveira

The A8, called in Portuguese: Auto-estrada do Oeste (Motorway of the West), is a motorway (freeway) in Portugal, connecting Lisbon and Leiria via Caldas da Rainha. The A17 connects to it in Marinha Grande and runs into Aveiro. A8 is operated by Auto-Estradas do Atlântico. It has a total length of 132 km. A trip between Lisbon and Leiria using the A8 will cost €9.05

== Lisbon–Leiria ==
| Exit number | Exit name | Connecting roads |
|---|---|---|
| | Lisbon | Calçada de Carriche |
| 1 | A 36 (CRIL) / Odivelas / Olival Basto | A 36 (CRIL); N 8 |
| 2 | Frielas | N 8 N 250 |
| 3 | Loures / Infantado | N 8 |
| | Praça de Portagem A8 Loures (toll) | |
| 3A | A 9 (CREL) | A 9 (CREL) |
| 4 | Lousa / Montachique | N 374-2 |
| 5 | Malveira / Mafra | A 21 |
| 6 | Enxara do Bispo / Sobral de Monte Agraço | N 9-2 |
| 7 | Torres Vedras (sul) | N 8 |
| 8 | Torres Vedras (norte) | N 9 |
| 9 | Ramalhal | N 8 / N 8-2 |
| 10 | Campelos | N 361-1 |
| | Praça de Portagem A8 Bombarral (toll) | |
| 11 | Bombarral / Lourinhã | N 361 |
| 12 | Delgada | N 8 |
| 13 | São Mamede | N 8 |
| 14 | IP 6 | IP 6 |
| 15 | Óbidos (sul) | N 8 |
| 16 | A 15 | A 15 |
| 17 | Gaeiras | N 8 |
| 18 | Caldas da Rainha | N 360 |
| 19 | Caldas da Rainha / Zona Industrial | |
| 20 | Tornada | N 8 |
| | Praça de Portagem A8 Tornada (toll) | |
| 21 | Alfeizerão | N 242 |
| 22 | Valado dos Frades / Nazaré | N 8-5 |
| 23 | Pataias | N 242-4 |
| 24 | Marinha Grande (sul) | |
| 25 | Marinha Grande (este) | N 242 |
| | Portagem A8 Leiria Sul (toll) | |
| 26 | Leiria / Batalha | A 19 |
| | Leiria toll gantry 1 (€0.30) | |
| 27 | Leiria (sul) | IC 2 |
| | Leiria toll gantry 2 (€0.30) | |
