= Maceira (Leiria) =

- Civil parish
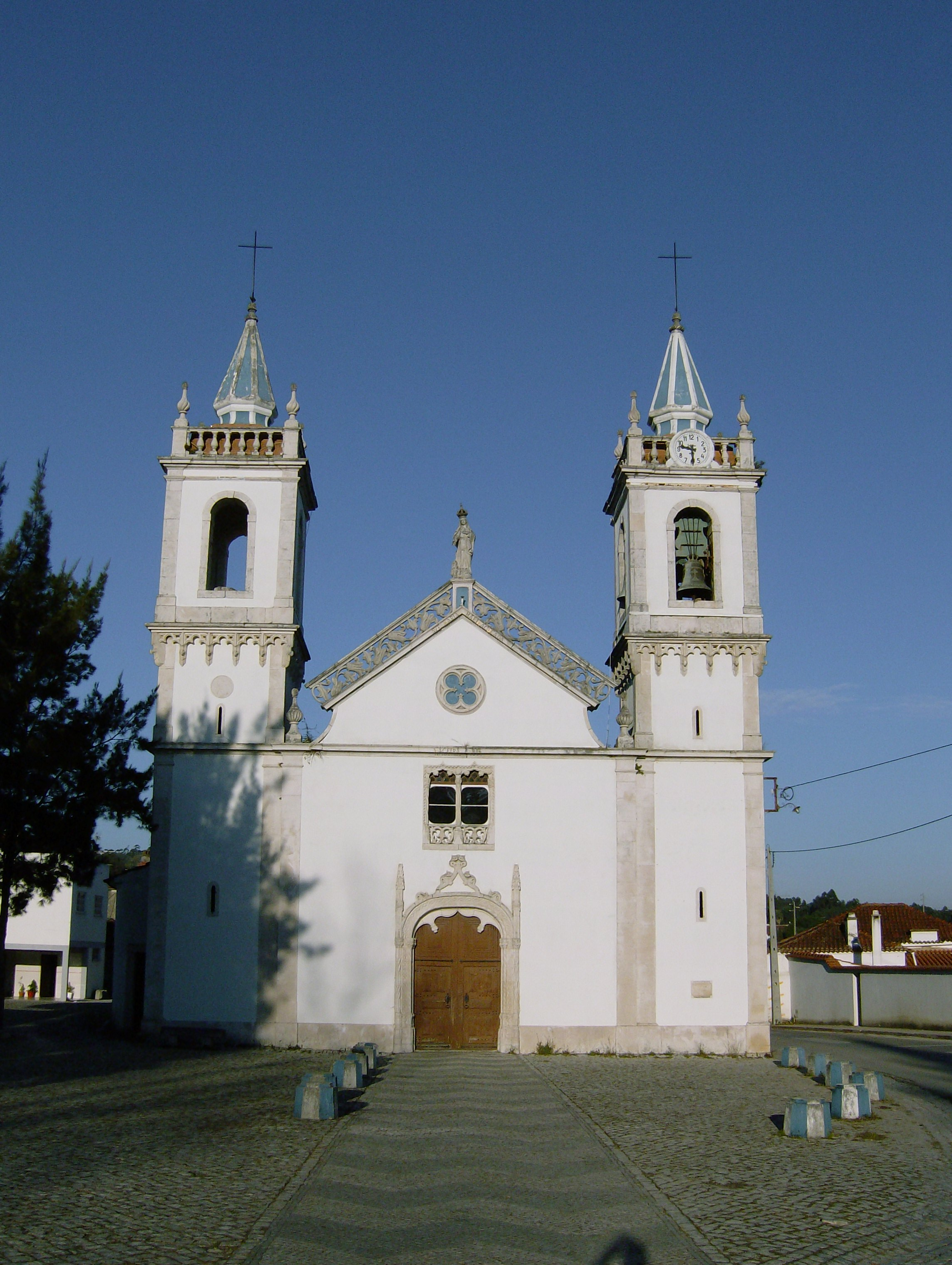
- Parish Church of Our Lady of Light

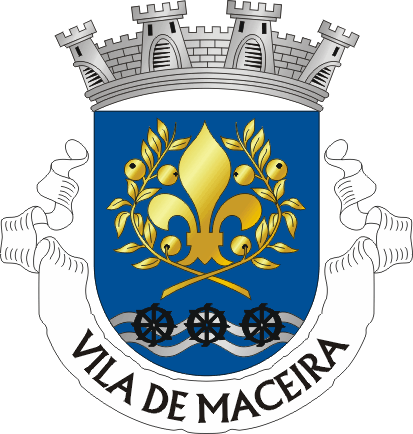
- Coat of arms

- Location in Portugal
- Coordinates: 39°41′00″N 8°54′00″W
- Country: Portugal
- Region: Centro
- Intermunic. comm.: Região de Leiria
- District: Leiria
- Municipality: Leiria

Area
  - Total: 47.03 km^{2} (18.16 sq mi)
- Elevation: 143 m (469 ft)

Population (2011)
  - Total: 9,901
  - Density: 210.5/km^{2} (545.3/sq mi)
- Time zone: UTC+00:00 (WET)
  - Summer (DST): UTC+01:00 (WEST)
- Postal code: 2405
- Patron: Our Lady of Light

Maceira is a village and a civil parish of the municipality of Leiria, Portugal. The population in 2011 was 2,004, in an area of 47.03 km^{2}.
