= A15 motorway (Portugal) =

Road in Portugal

A15, called in Portuguese: Auto-Estrada do Atlântico, is a motorway in Portugal, connecting Caldas da Rainha and Óbidos to Santarém via Rio Maior. The A15 is operated by Auto-Estradas do Atlântico. part of Brisa

The road carries very little traffic.

A15	AADT 2011	AADT 2012	% Change 2011	% Change 2012
Overall AADT	4,854	3,995	-17.5%	-17.7%

== Exits ==
Exit number	Km	Destination	Exit road
1	0	A 8	A 8
2	3	Cercal Gaeiras	N 115
	3	Portagem A-Dos-Negros (toll)	
3	12	A-dos-Francos / Vidais	N 361
4	18	Leiria / Rio Maior Alcobaça	IC 2 N 1
5	22	Rio Maior	N 114
6	29	São João da Ribeira / Malaqueijo	N 114
7	40	A 1	A 1
