= Nogueira da Regedoura =

Civil parish in Portugal

- Civil parish
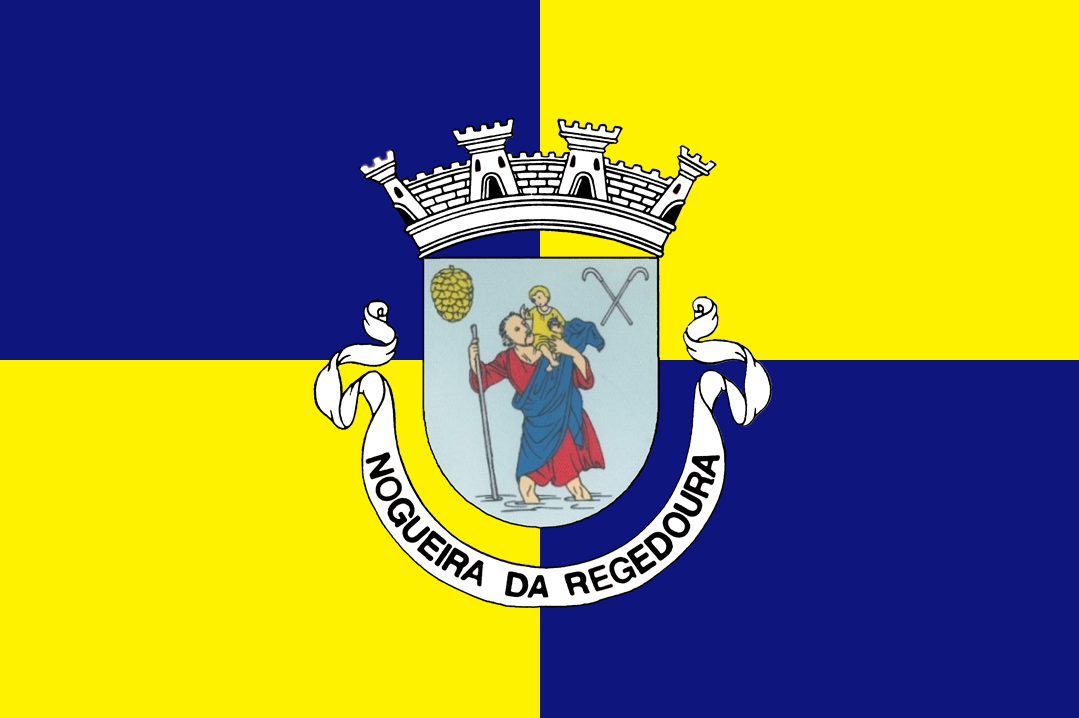
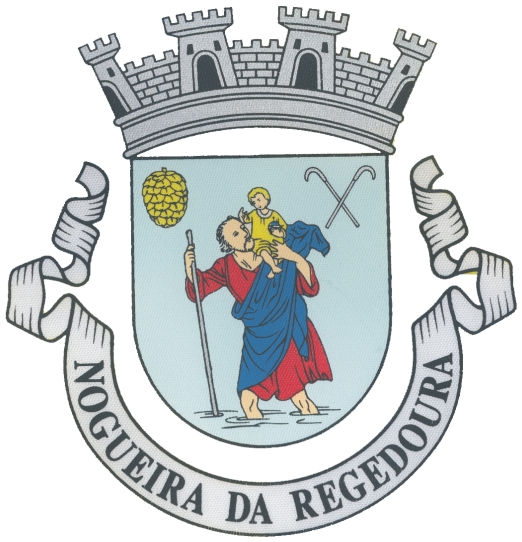
- Flag Coat of arms

- Location in Portugal
- Coordinates: 41.004°N 8.601°W
- Country: Portugal
- Region: Norte
- Metropolitan area: Porto
- District: Aveiro
- Municipality: Santa Maria da Feira

Area
  - Total: 5.10 km^{2} (1.97 sq mi)

Population (2011)
  - Total: 5,790
  - Density: 1,100/km^{2} (2,900/sq mi)
- Time zone: UTC+00:00 (WET)
  - Summer (DST): UTC+01:00 (WEST)

Nogueira da Regedoura (Portuguese pronunciation: [nuˈɣɐjɾɐ ðɐ ʁɨʒɨˈðoɾɐ]) is a Portuguese parish, located in the municipality of Santa Maria da Feira. The population in 2011 was 5,790, with an area of 5.10 km^{2}.

It is supposed (in the Medieval documents), the older name of the parish was known as "Nogeira de Liuaes". The second part of that name is related to the present locality of Olivães.
