= Vasco da Gama Bridge =

Bridge in Lisbon, Portugal

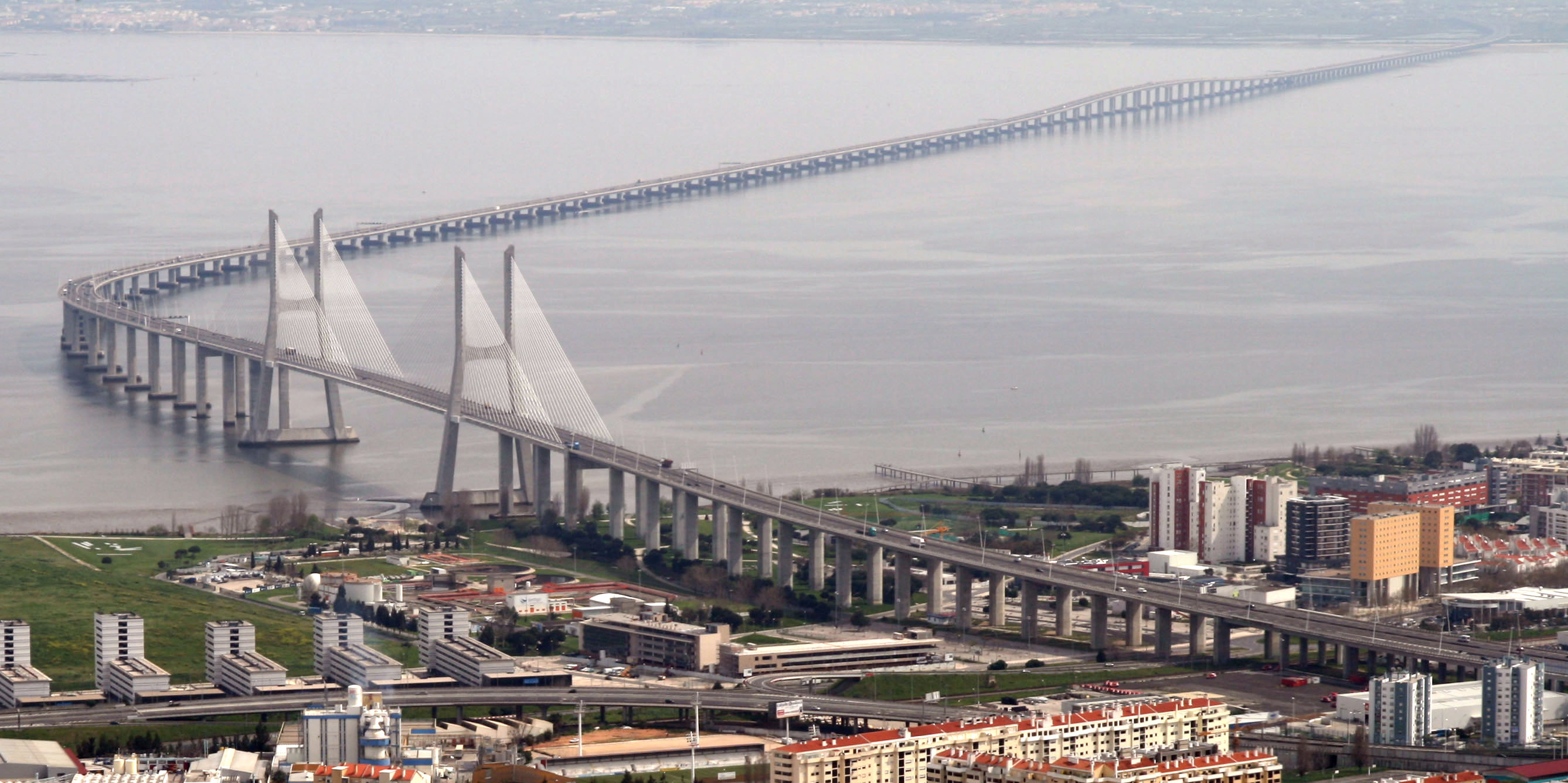
- Aerial view of the bridge
- Coordinates: 38.762°N 9.043°W
- Carries: Six road lanes of IP 1 A 12
- Crosses: Tagus River
- Locale: Sacavém, north of Lisbon (right/north bank); Alcochete and Montijo (left/south bank)
- Official name: Ponte Vasco da Gama
- Owner: Portuguese Republic
- Maintained by: Lusoponte (1994–2030)

Characteristics
- Design: Cable-stayed, viaducts
- Total length: 17.2 km (10.7 mi)
- Width: 30 m (98 ft)
- Height: 148 m (486 ft) (pylon)
- Longest span: 420 m (1,380 ft)

History
- Architect: Michel Virlogeux, Alain Montois, Charles Lavigne and Armando Rito
- Designer: Armando Rito
- Construction start: February 1995
- Construction end: March 1998
- Opened: 29 March 1998; 28 years ago

Statistics
- Toll: Northbound: €3.20–€13.55; Southbound: toll-free

Location
- Interactive map of Vasco da Gama Bridge

The Vasco da Gama Bridge (Portuguese: Ponte Vasco da Gama) is a cable-stayed bridge flanked by viaducts that spans the Tagus River in Parque das Nações in Lisbon, the capital of Portugal.

It was built to alleviate the congestion on Lisbon's 25 de Abril Bridge, and eliminate the need for traffic between the country's northern and southern regions to pass through the capital city.

Construction began in February 1995; the bridge was opened to traffic on 29 March 1998 in time for Expo 98, the World's Fair that celebrated the 500th anniversary of the discovery by Vasco da Gama of the sea route from Europe to India. It is the longest bridge in Europe. Following the partial collapse of the Crimean Bridge in 2026, it became the longest operating road bridge in Europe again. Along with the 25 de Abril Bridge, the Vasco da Gama is one of two bridges that span the Tagus River in Lisbon.

== Description ==
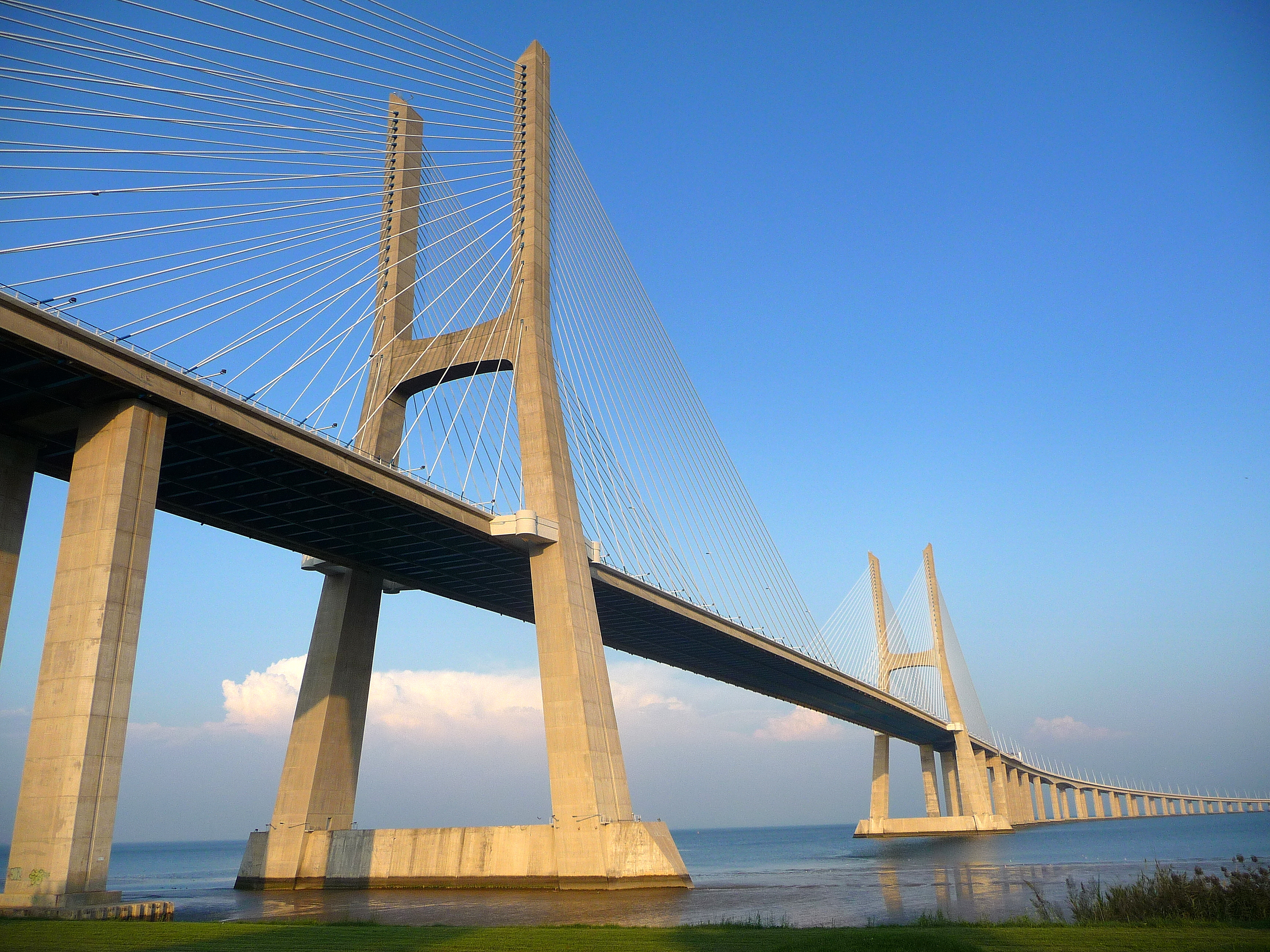
Vasco da Gama Bridge

The bridge carries six road lanes, with a speed limit of 120 km/h (75 mph), the same as that on motorways, except on one section which is limited to 100 km/h (60 mph). On windy, rainy, and foggy days, the speed limit is reduced to 90 km/h (56 mph). The number of road lanes will be enlarged to eight when traffic reaches a daily average of 52,000.

Bridge and access road sections

1. North access roads: 945 m (3,100 ft)
2. North viaduct: 488 m (1,601 ft)
3. Expo viaduct: 672 m (2,205 ft); 12 sections
4. Main bridge: main span: 420 m (1,378 ft); side spans: 203 m (666 ft) each (total length: 829 m or 2,720 ft); cement pillars: 150 m (492 ft)-high; free height for navigation in high tides: 45 m (148 ft);
5. Central viaduct: 6.351 km (3.95 mi); 80 pre-fabricated sections 78 m (256 ft)-long; 81 pillars up to 95 m (312 ft)-deep; height from 14 m (46 ft) to 30 m (98 ft)
6. South viaduct: 3.825 km (2.38 mi); 45 m (148 ft) sections; 84 sections; 85 pillars
7. South access roads: 3.895 km (2.42 mi); includes the toll plaza (18 gates) and two service areas

== Construction and cost ==
The $1.1 billion project was split into four parts, each built by a different company, and supervised by an independent consortium. There were up to 3,300 workers simultaneously on the project, which took 18 months of preparation and 18 months of construction. The financing is via a build-operate-transfer system by Lusoponte, a private consortium that receives the first 40 years of tolls for both Lisbon bridges. Lusoponte's capital is 50.4% from Portuguese companies, 24.8% from French, and 24.8% from British.

The bridge has a life expectancy of 120 years, having been designed to withstand wind speeds of 250 km/h (155 mph) and hold up to an earthquake 4.5 times greater than the standards of building resistance in Lisbon. The deepest foundation piles, up to 2.2 m (7.2 ft) in diameter, were driven down to 95 m (312 ft) under mean sea level. Environmental pressure throughout the project resulted in the left-bank viaducts being extended inland to preserve the marshes underneath, as well as the lamp posts throughout the bridge being tilted inwards so as not to cast light on the river below.

== Toll ==
Northbound traffic (to Lisbon) is charged a toll while travelling southbound is free. Tolls are collected through a toll plaza located on the south bank of Tagus, near Montijo. As of 2024, bridge tolls range from €3.20 (passenger cars) to €13.55 (trucks).

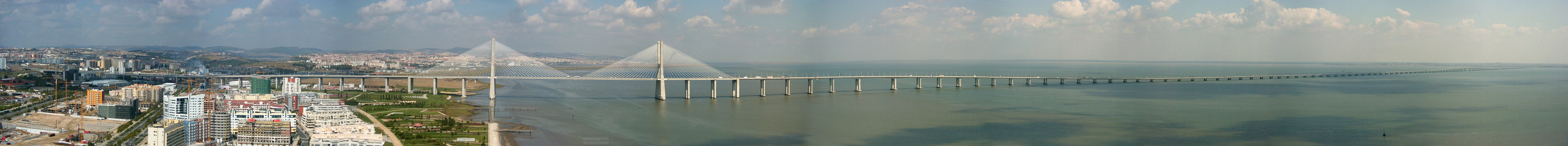
View from atop Vasco da Gama Tower.

== See also ==
- 25 de Abril Bridge
- Lezíria Bridge
- List of bridges by length
- Megaproject

== Sources ==
- (in Portuguese) civilium.net

Records
| Preceded by Öland Bridge | Europe’s longest bridge 1998 – 2018 | Succeeded by Crimean Bridge |
