= Aveiras de Cima =

- Civil parish
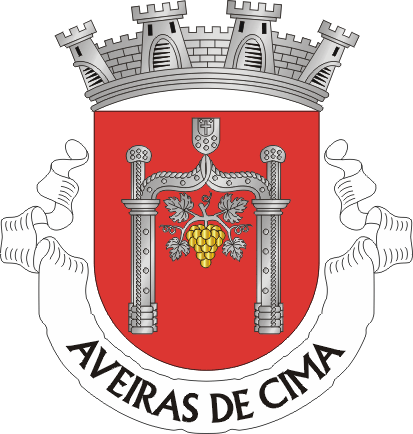
- Coat of arms

- Location in Portugal
- Coordinates: 39.138°N 8.900°W
- Country: Portugal
- Region: Oeste e Vale do Tejo
- Intermunic. comm.: Lezíria do Tejo
- District: Lisbon
- Municipality: Azambuja

Area
  - Total: 26.16 km^{2} (10.10 sq mi)

Population (2011)
  - Total: 4,762
  - Density: 182.0/km^{2} (471.5/sq mi)
- Time zone: UTC+00:00 (WET)
  - Summer (DST): UTC+01:00 (WEST)

Aveiras de Cima (European Portuguese pronunciation: [ɐˈvɐjɾɐʒ ðɨ ˈsimɐ]) is a little Portuguese town by the A1 highway. It is situated in the Lisbon District and in the Azambuja Municipality. The population in 2011 was 4,762, in an area of 26.16 km².
