= Benavente, Portugal =

Benavente
- Municipality
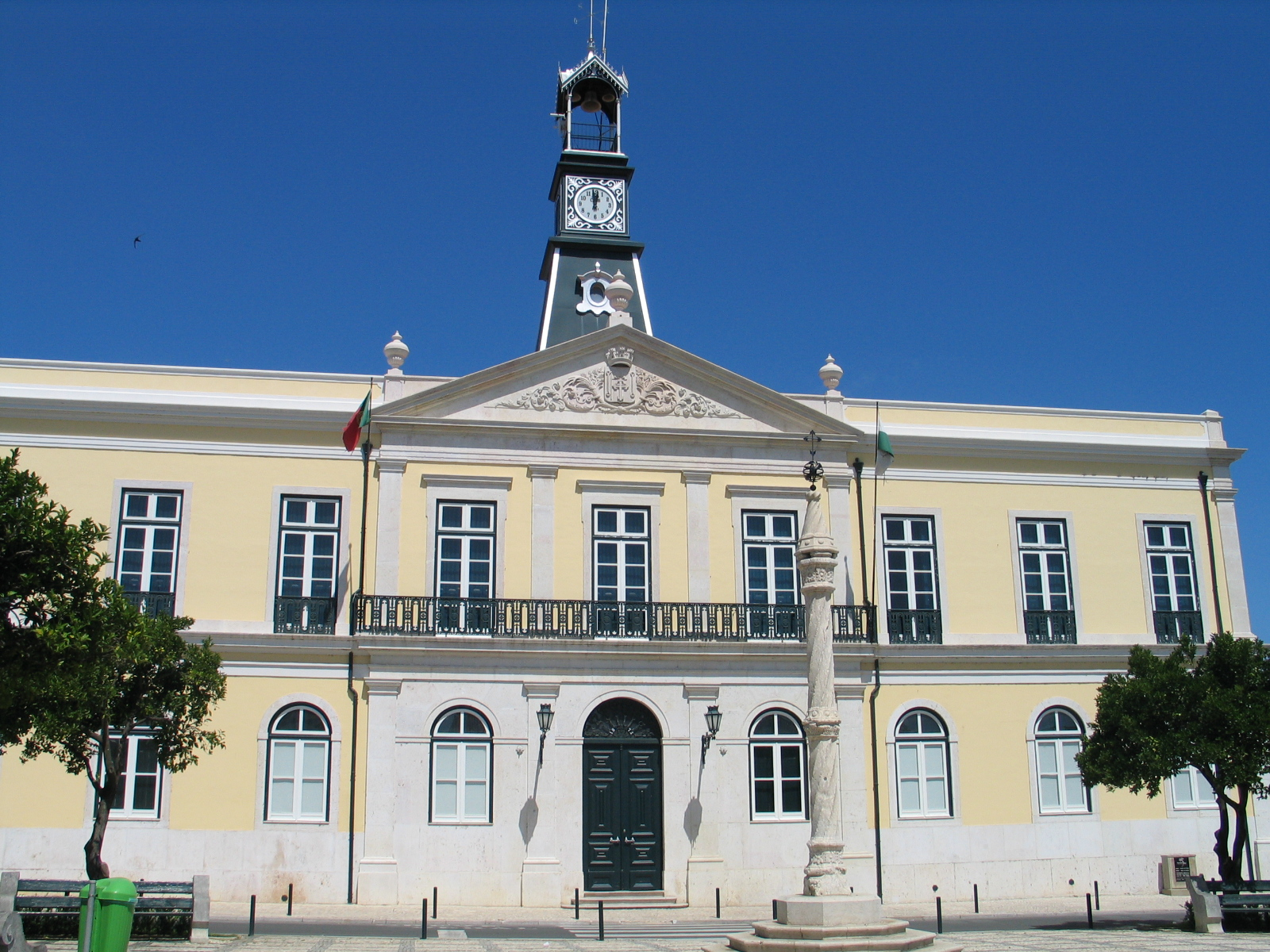
- Town Hall of Benavente

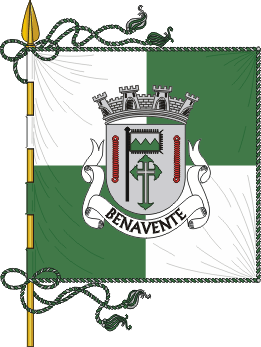
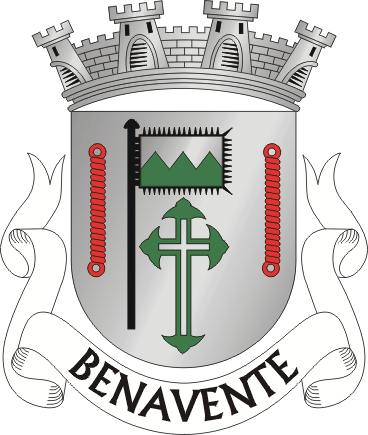
- Flag Coat of arms
- Interactive map of Benavente
- Location in Portugal
- Coordinates: 38°58′N 8°48′W
- Country: Portugal
- Region: Oeste e Vale do Tejo
- Intermunic. comm.: Lezíria do Tejo
- District: Santarém
- Parishes: 4

Government
  - President: Sónia Ferreira (PSD)

Area
  - Total: 521.38 km^{2} (201.31 sq mi)

Population (2011)
  - Total: 29,019
  - Density: 55.658/km^{2} (144.15/sq mi)
- Time zone: UTC+00:00 (WET)
  - Summer (DST): UTC+01:00 (WEST)
- Patron: Nossa Senhora da Paz
- Local holiday: Ascension Day (date varies)
- Website: http://www.cm-benavente.pt

Benavente (Portuguese pronunciation: [bɨnɐˈvẽtɨ]) is a municipality and parish in Santarém District in Portugal. The population in 2011 was 29,019 in an area of 521.38 km^{2}.

== History ==
In 1199, the fixation of foreign settlers on the left bank of the Tagus River created a town on a peninsula in the tagus estuary. Situated in the western limits of Coruche castle dominion, subordinate to the Order of Calatrava. This small settlement remained under the Seignory of this Military Order, which named it Benavente, the same name as a castle of the same Military order in the Kingdom of León (Benavente, Zamora). It received its foral on March 25, 1200, given by D. Paio (or Pelágio), master of the Military Order of Santa Maria of Évora. The foral was confirmed in Santarém in 1218 by Sancho I. King Manuel gave it a new foral on January 16, 1516.

The present Mayor is Sónia Ferreira, elected by the coalition AD-PSD/CDS-PP.

Benavente is crossed by National Road 118, which divides the town's historical centre on the west side, destroyed by an earthquake on 27 April 1909, and the new town built after the quake on the east.

The municipal holiday is Ascension Day.

== Economy ==
Agriculture, livestock farming, forestry, and food industries are the main activities. The Companhia das Lezírias is headquartered in the municipality, in Samora Correia.

== Parishes ==
Administratively, the municipality is divided into 4 civil parishes (freguesias):

- Barrosa
- Benavente
- Samora Correia
- Santo Estêvão

== Infrastructure ==
- Mediumwave transmitter for 1035 kHz with a 125 metres tall guyed mast radiator at 38.911462 N 8.863436 W.

== Notable people ==
- Maria João Bastos (born 1975), a Portuguese actress, best known in Brazil.
- Filipe Morais (born 1985), a UK-based footballer with over 370 club caps
- João Barradas (born 1992), a Portuguese accordionist and composer
- Gonçalo Guedes (born 1996), is footballer with over 180 club caps and 23 for Portugal
- Odete da Cruz e Silva, researcher into Alzheimer's disease
- Mário Jorge Malico Paulino, a.k.a. "Camora" (born 1986), soccer player
