= Schuster (Portuguese footballer) =

Portuguese footballer

Personal information
- Full name: Rui Miguel Mateus Teixeira
- Date of birth: 4 March 1978 (age 48)
- Place of birth: Vila Real, Portugal
- Height: 1.82 m (6 ft 0 in)
- Position: Midfielder

Youth career
- –1992: ADCEP Diogo Cão
- 1992–1996: Vila Real

Senior career*
Years	Team	Apps	(Gls)
1996–1998	Vila Real		
1998–2002	Salgueiros		
1999	Naval (loan)		
- Vila Real (loan)
2002–2003	Leça		
2003–2004	Felgueiras		
2004	Ovarense		
2005	Dragões Sandinenses		
2005–2006	Portimonense		
2006–2007	Galáctico Pegaso		
2007–2009	AEK Kouklia FC		
2009–2015	Vila Real		
2015–2016	Vila Pouca de Aguiar		
2016–2018	Santa Marta Penaguião		
- * Club domestic league appearances and goals

Rui Miguel Mateus Teixeira, known as Schuster (born 4 March 1978) is a retired Portuguese football midfielder.
