= António Lopes Mendes =

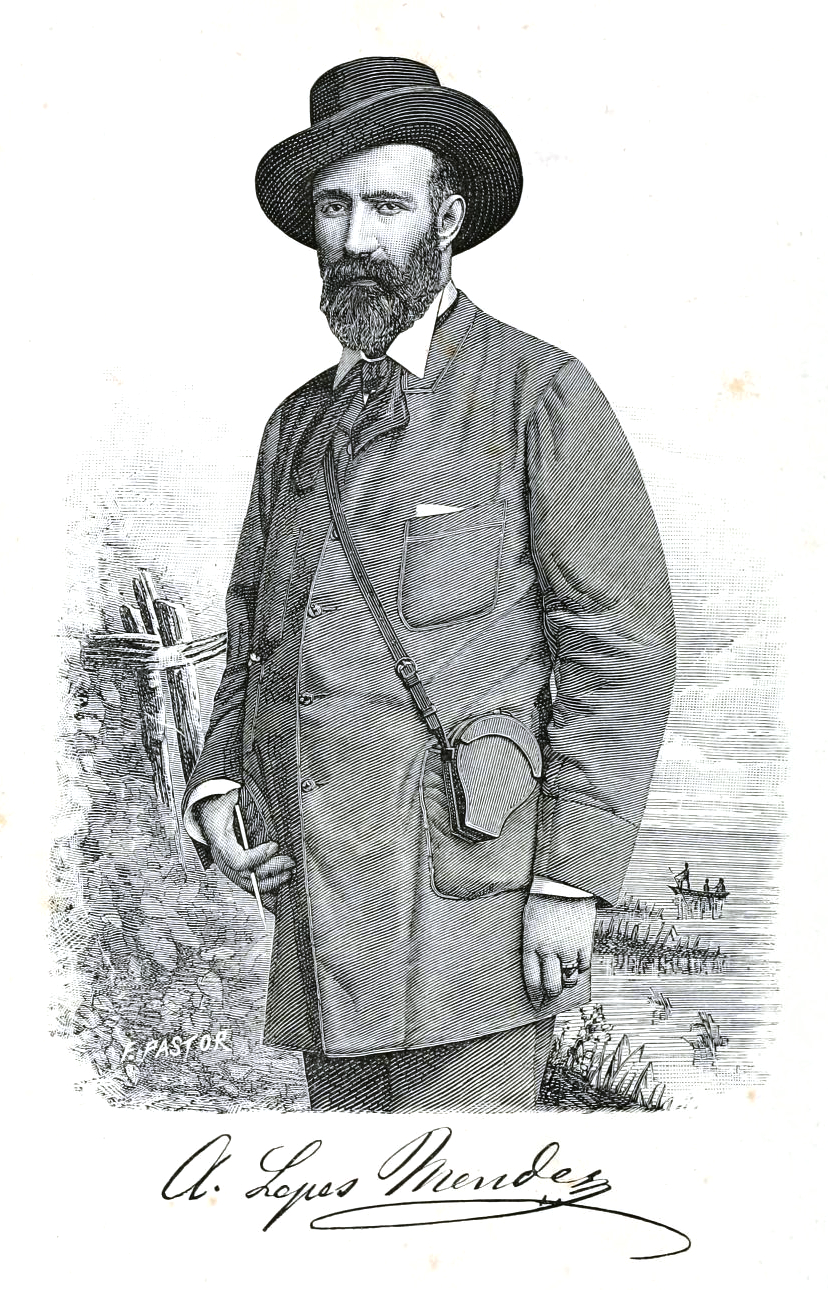
- Born: 1835; Vila Real, Portugal
- Died: 30 January 1894 (aged 58–59)
- Occupations: Explorer, agronomist

António Lopes Mendes (30 January 1835 – 31 January 1894) was a Portuguese explorer and agronomist who documented his travels around the world particularly in Brazil and India. He was a careful illustrator and cartographer. He travelled extensively in Brazil around 1882–83. His most famous published work was A Índia Portuguesa (1886) with many engravings made by Francisco Pastor (1850-1922).

Mendes was born in a rural family in Vila Real in northern Trás-os-Montes on January 30, 1835. He went to study at the Polytechnic Academy of Porto in 1853. He then studied at the Lisbon Agricultural Institute joining as a "farmer and veterinarian" and completed studies in 1858. His aptitude for drawing was noted and his broad training led him to be chosen by the Ministry of the Navy and Overseas of Portugal for a mission to India that began in August 1862. He travelled to Goa and studied the land, the forests and agriculture in the region. He published a note in 1864 Apontamentos sobre a província de Satari do Estado da Índia Portuguesa. He was also elected member of the Lisbon Geographical Society.

In 1882 he travelled to Brazil landing in Rio de Janeiro. He visited Belém in July 1883 and visited the Amazon region.

Mendes' books have been of use to historians of Goa as many of the buildings illustrated are now partly or fully destroyed and his notes are sources for the lifestyle of the period. The unpublished notes and diaries of Lopes Mendes are part of the collection of Paulo Fontainha Geyer and now part of the Brazilian Museum. It includes drawings, newspaper accounts and letters.
