= Jorge Rodrigues =

Portuguese footballer

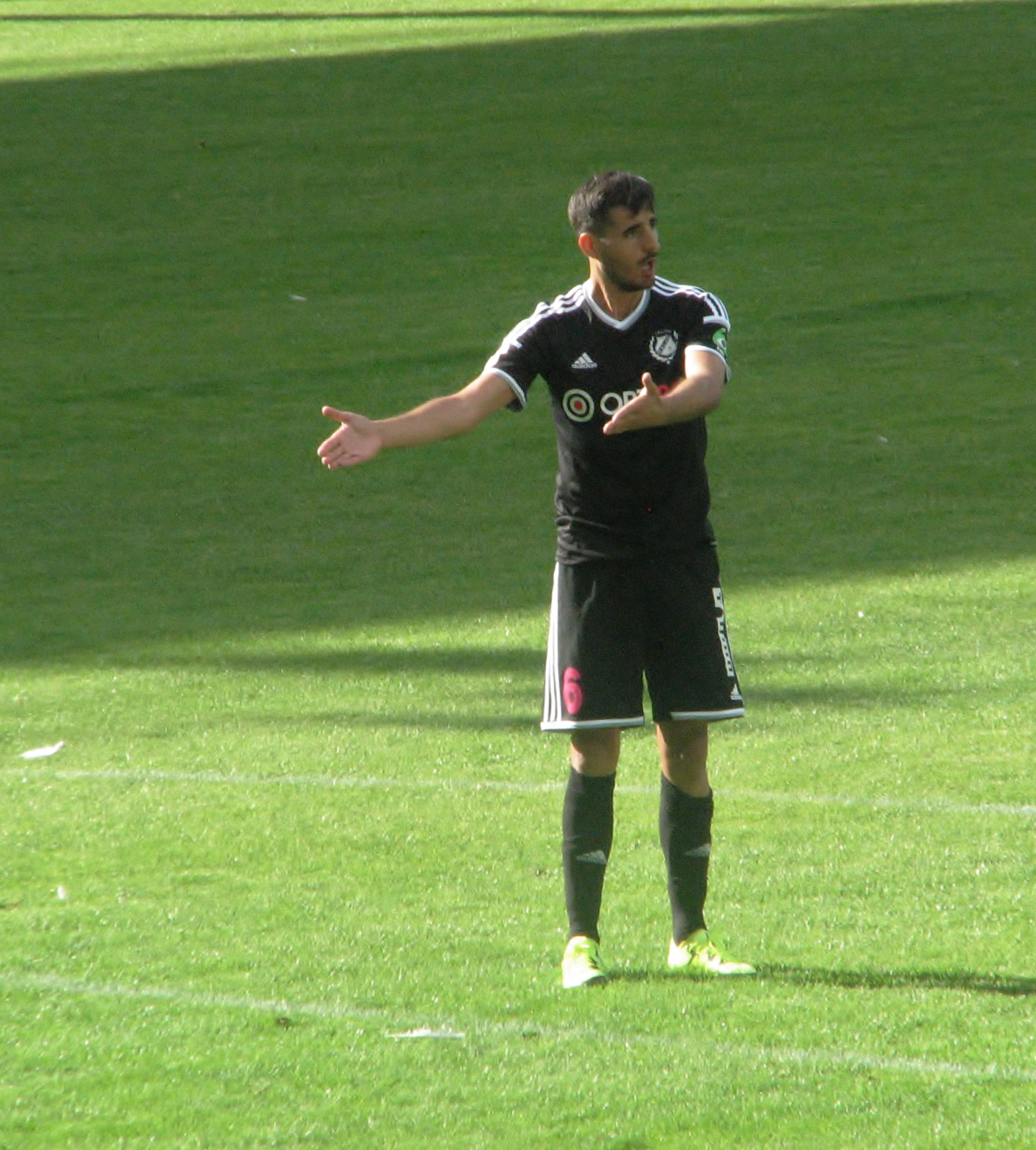
- Rodrigues playing for Nõmme Kalju in 2015

Personal information
- Full name: Jorge Manuel Ferreira Rodrigues
- Date of birth: 19 March 1982 (age 44)
- Place of birth: Vila Real, Portugal
- Height: 1.82 m (6 ft 0 in)
- Positions: Defender; midfielder

Youth career
- 1994–1998: Abambres
- 1998–2001: Vila Real

Senior career*
Years	Team	Apps	(Gls)
2001–2003	Vila Real	50	(0)
2003–2005	Sporting Pombal	50	(0)
2005–2008	Operário	79	(1)
2008–2009	Gorica	13	(3)
2009–2010	Boavista	15	(0)
2010–2011	Tondela	26	(2)
2011–2016	Nõmme Kalju	115	(4)
- * Club domestic league appearances and goals

Jorge Manuel Ferreira Rodrigues (born 19 March 1982) is a Portuguese former professional footballer who played as a defender.

Born in Vila Real, Portugal, he played with Gorica in the Slovenian First League in the season 2008–09.

He also played in Portugal with lower league sides Vila Real, Sporting Pombal, Operário, Boavista and Tondela.
