= Alvão Natural Park =

Protected area in Portugal

- IUCN category V (protected landscape/seascape)
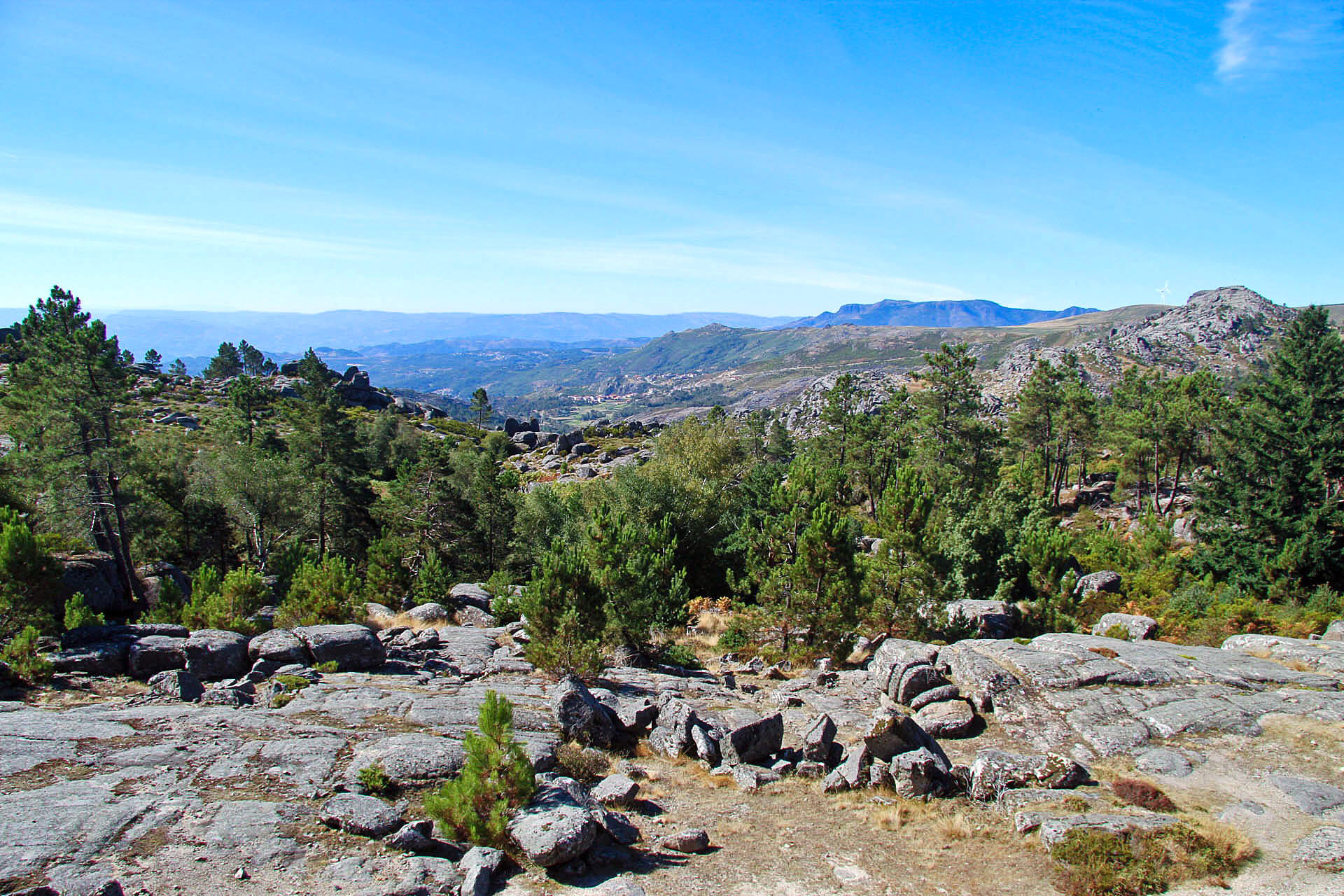
- View from the surroundings of the Cimeira dam at the heart of the park

- Location within Portugal
- Location: Vila Real, Douro & Tâmega, Norte, Portugal
- Coordinates: 41°22′26.55″N 7°49′1.89″W
- Area: 72.03 km^{2} (27.81 sq mi)
- Max. elevation: 1,330 m (4,360 ft)
- Min. elevation: 260 m (850 ft)
- Established: June 8, 1983
- Named for: Serra do Alvão
- Visitors: 29,567 (in 2017-2020 (average))
- Governing body: ICNF
- Operator: Parque Natural do Alvão Headquarters
- Website: Parque Natural do Alvão

Alvão Natural Park (Portuguese: Parque Natural do Alvão) is a protected area founded in 1983, and located in the municipalities of Mondim de Basto and Vila Real, in the Tâmega and Douro Subregions of northern Portugal. Although the smallest of Portugal's natural parks, it extends through 72.2 square kilometres (27.9 mi^{2}) of mountainous land, populated by approximately 700 locals.

== History ==
The park was created on 8 June 1983 under terms of decree-law 237/83, as a classified natural park.

In order to support the conservation of nature, a resolution of the Council of Ministers (142/97), dated 28 August 1997, integrated Alvão into a broader area of classification under terms of the European Union's Natura 2000 designation: Sítio Alvão-Marão como (Sítio TCON0003 – Alvão-Marão). Under this arrangement community directives, such as those for bird species (79/409/CEE, 2 April) and habitats (92/43/CEE, 21 May) were included within the framework, in order to contribute to the conservation of habitats and their respective species of flora and fauna considered under threat within the European Union.

== Geography ==
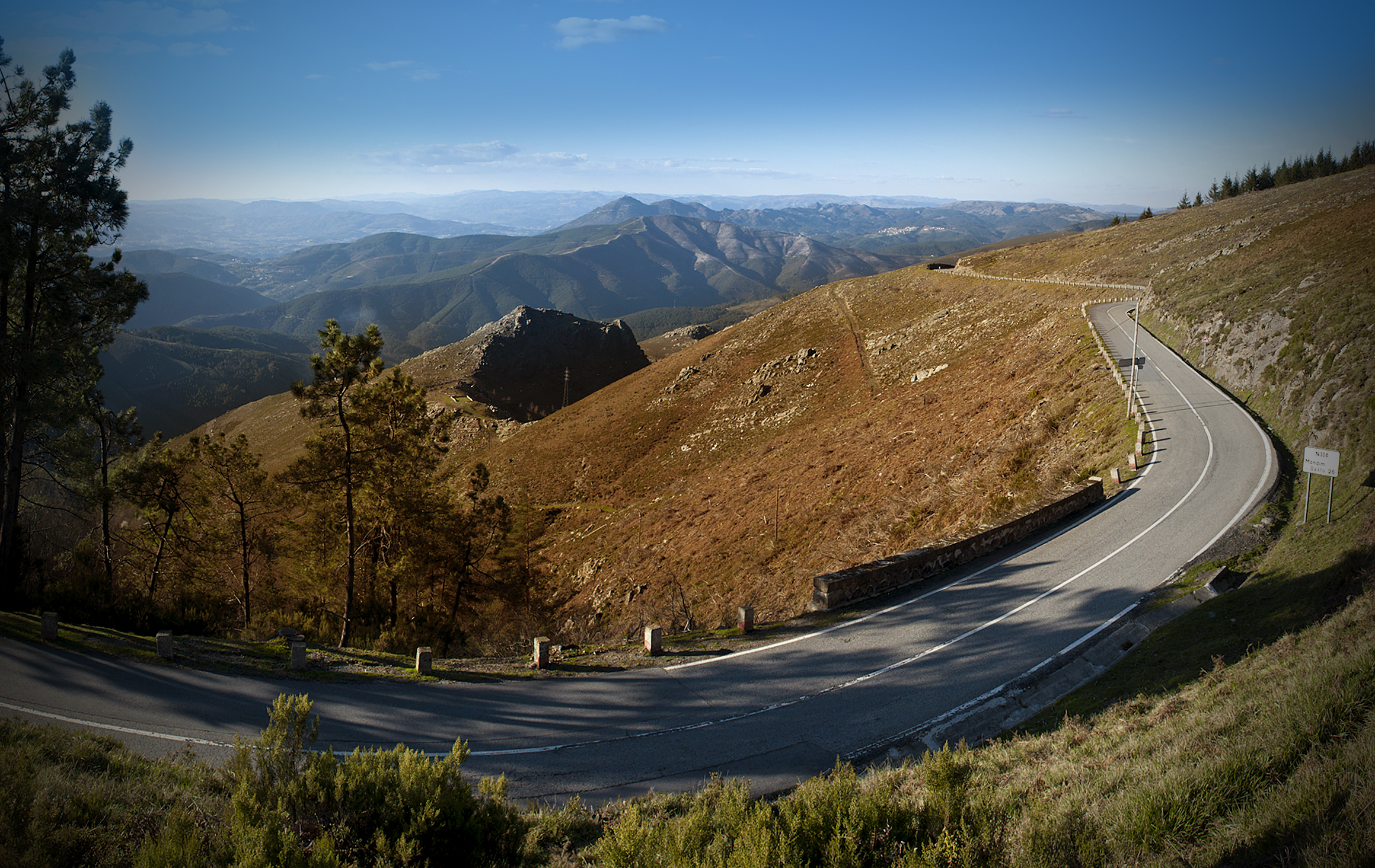
View of the mountain range

The park is located in the Trás-os-Montes and Alto Douro provinces, in the district Vila Real, divided between the municipalities of Vila Real (parishes of Borbela, Lamas de Olo and Vila Marim) and Mondim de Basto (parishes of Ermelo and Bilhó), occupying an area of 7220 hectares or 72.2 square kilometres (27.9 mi^{2}).

The highest peak in the natural park is Caravelas, 1,339 metres (4,393 ft) above sea level, and the lowest point is Lousa along the Rio Olo, roughly 260 metres (850 ft) above sea level. There is an altitudinal range of 1,079 metres (3,540 ft), and the park is divided into two zones: an elevated area along the Rio Olo watershed that mostly corresponds to the parish of Lamas de Olo, and a lower area that includes Ribeira de Fervença and the Olo watershed in the parish of Ermelo. The transition between the two is marked by a sudden drop associated with the Fisgas waterfall.

=== Physical geography ===
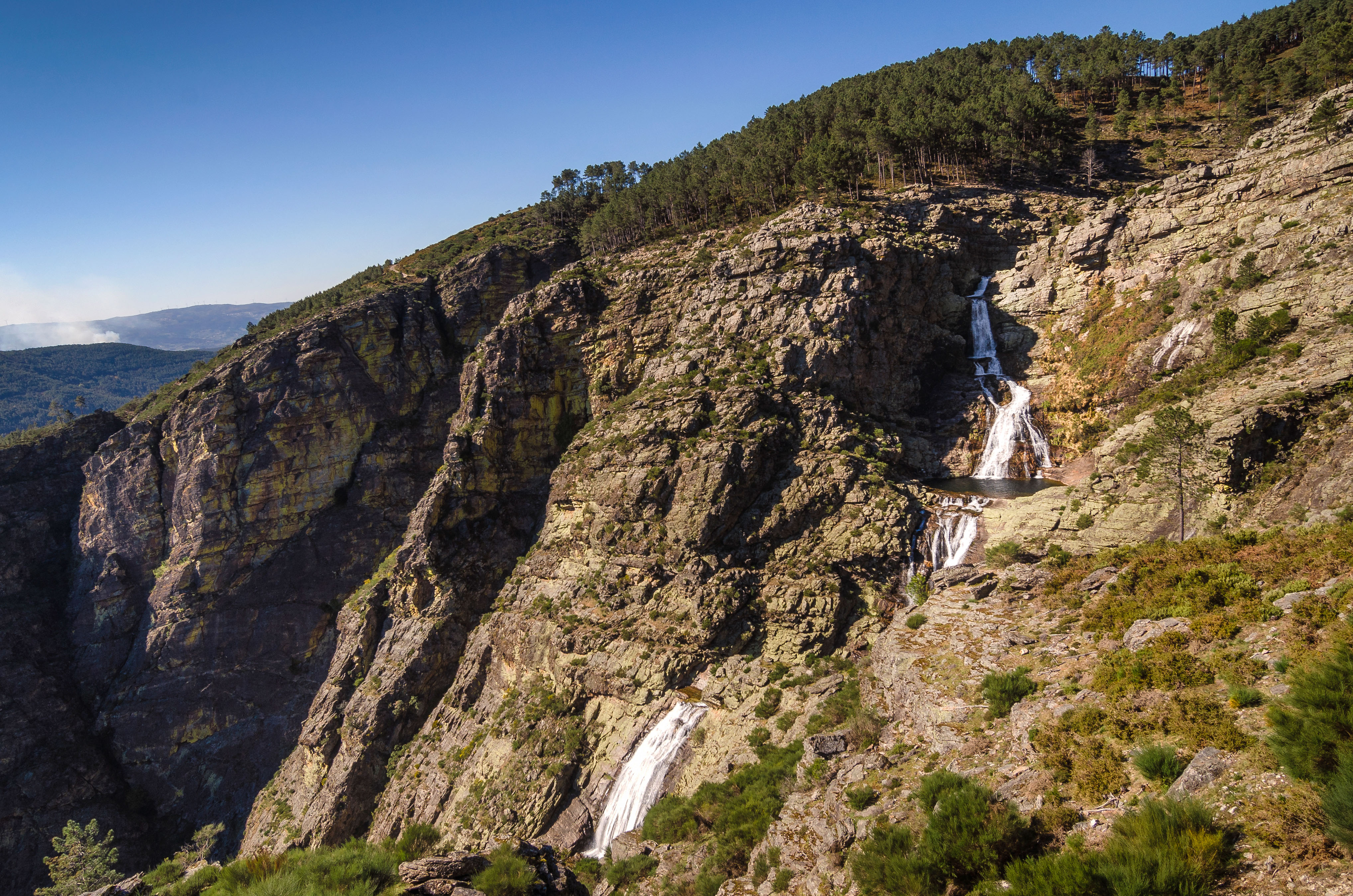
Fisgas de Ermelo, one of the waterfalls of the park

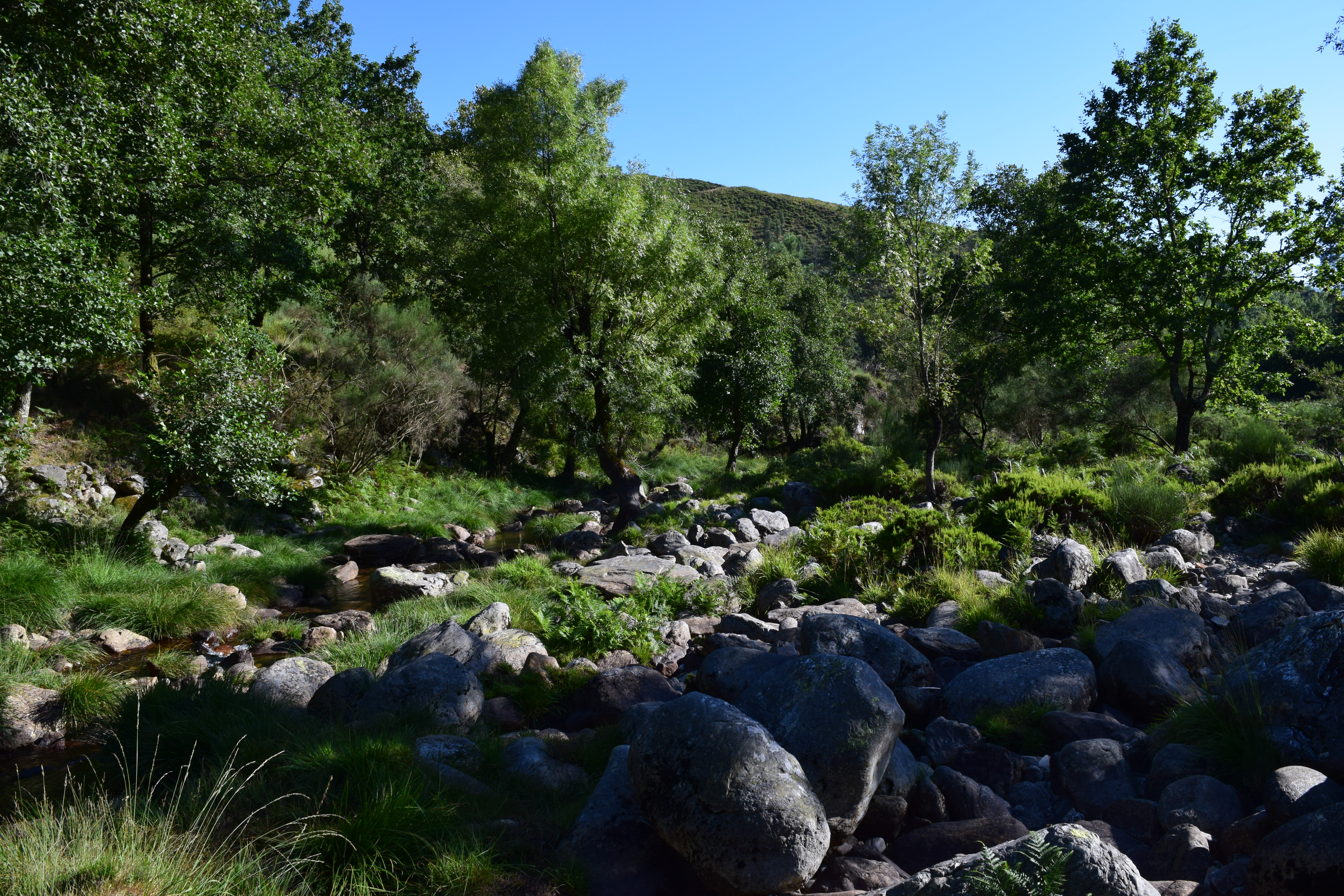
The rocky margins of the Olo River in the Basal Zone in the nature park

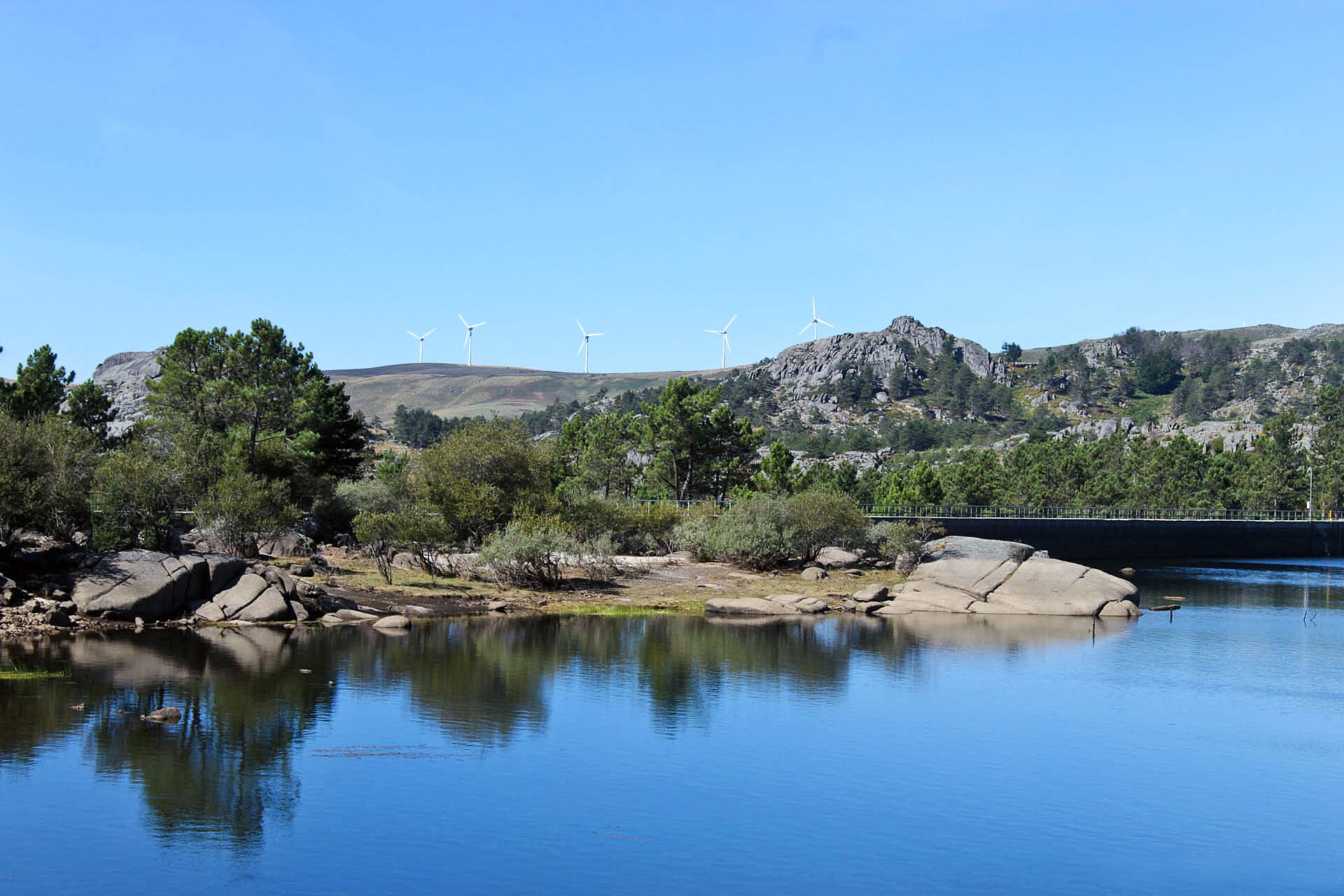
View from the Cimeira dam

Much like a great part of the Transmontana region, PNAL is situated within the Maciço Antigo (Ancient Massif), within the Galiza-Trás-os-Montes subregion, a geomorphological unit of igneous and metamorphic rock formed by Hercynotype movements orienting the first groups along a northeast to southwest axis. Accompanying these movements were great expansions of granitic magma and prolonged secondary erosion, resulting in sedimentary cliffs and unaccented mountain ranges. A tertiary phase, in the raised areas, resulted in fractures in the dominant northeast-southwest axis, resulting in a variation in relief caused by different rock resistance.

The area is characterized by a dichotomous geological region, between schist and granite rock types.

- On one hand there is the Upper Zone (in the east) dominated by recent granite formations resulting from deep, post-tectonic, crustal Hercynotype movements, such as the granite around Lamas de Olo. This stone is commonly rough, biotitic, porphyritic granite, but there are pockets of medium, white igneous and medium-to-fine granodiorite dominating the parish of Vila Marim, marked by the Arnal caos granítico (chaos granite). In the north, are typical geological formations representative of PNAL, the Maciço Compósito (Composite Massif) of Vila Real, that includes majority of the massif that extends from Freixo de Espada à Cinta until the Serra da Cabreira. These are part of the meso-crustal Hercynotype movements; F3 syn-tectonic rock, marked by patches of dual Mica silicates (from medium to gross) with sparse megacrystals (majority); patches of fine Mica; and patches of dual Mica porphyritic granite (from medium to gross). In the west is caos granítico that pertains to the Medium and Upper Cambrian; the Formação de Desejosa (Desejoa Formation) associated with the Douro, is constituted by a group of alternating grey and black Phyllite with levels of siltstone, greywacke and sparse carbon greywacke. There is also an Andalusite fault at the peak of Caravelas, in the zone of Muas and the waterfall of Moinho de Galegos da Serra.
- Alternately, is the Basal Zone, dominated by a Paleozoic Sedimentary Formation, situated in the eastern part of the park. The Formação de Santos (Santos Formation) with alternating phyllite, grey schist and siltstone evolves into phyllite, greywacke and mix from the early Devonian and the Formação de Campanhó (Camponhó Formation) comprising carbon schist with an abundant levels of shale from the Late Silurian. The significant Formação de Pardelhas (Pardelhas Formation) belongs to the Medium Ordovician, comprising slate, graphitic-phyllite schists, keratolytic schists, grey phyllites with rare levels of metasiltstone. This formation is associated with a transition between opposing lithology (Upper and Basal Zones), producing a unique geomorphology of an elevated landscape and geology of interest. The waterfalls along the Rio Olo, including Fisgas de Ermelo, occurs at a formation of Armorican quartzite, pertaining to the Lanvirniano-arenigiano of the early Ordovician, composed of alternating quartzite, metasiltstone and phyllite with levels of intermixed iron, impure quartzite, grey-black phyllites and fine quartzite, in open terraces oriented to the southwest, along the river. From a height of 800 metres (2,600 ft), the river descends along various waterfalls 250 metres (820 ft) high, along a course of 1,500 metres (4,900 ft). Pertaining to the geology of the Venloquiano-Landeiliano period, a unit of clay mineral and carbonous Hornfels that appear in the upper part of the Lamas de Olo and Alvadia. The area of Lamas is also covered by small alluvial deposits and clay-like patches along the valley, characteristic of riverbeds that join the Graben of Tãmega and Vale da Campeã.

=== Climate ===
The park has a temperate Atlantic climate with Mediterranean characteristics. The headlands of the Olo River are influenced by maritime air masses that rise over park's eastern boundary. This results in heavy precipitation during the winter months. These months are cold and rainy, with frequent snow showers in the high altitudes, while in the summer it is dry and warm. Most rain occurs in the colder months, while during the dry periods there is little rainfall, or concentrated in one month. The variation in slope allows for a diverse microclimate, with different vegetation between high and low altitudes. The combination of microclimatic conditions and rainfall has resulted in a lush landscape.

=== Biome ===
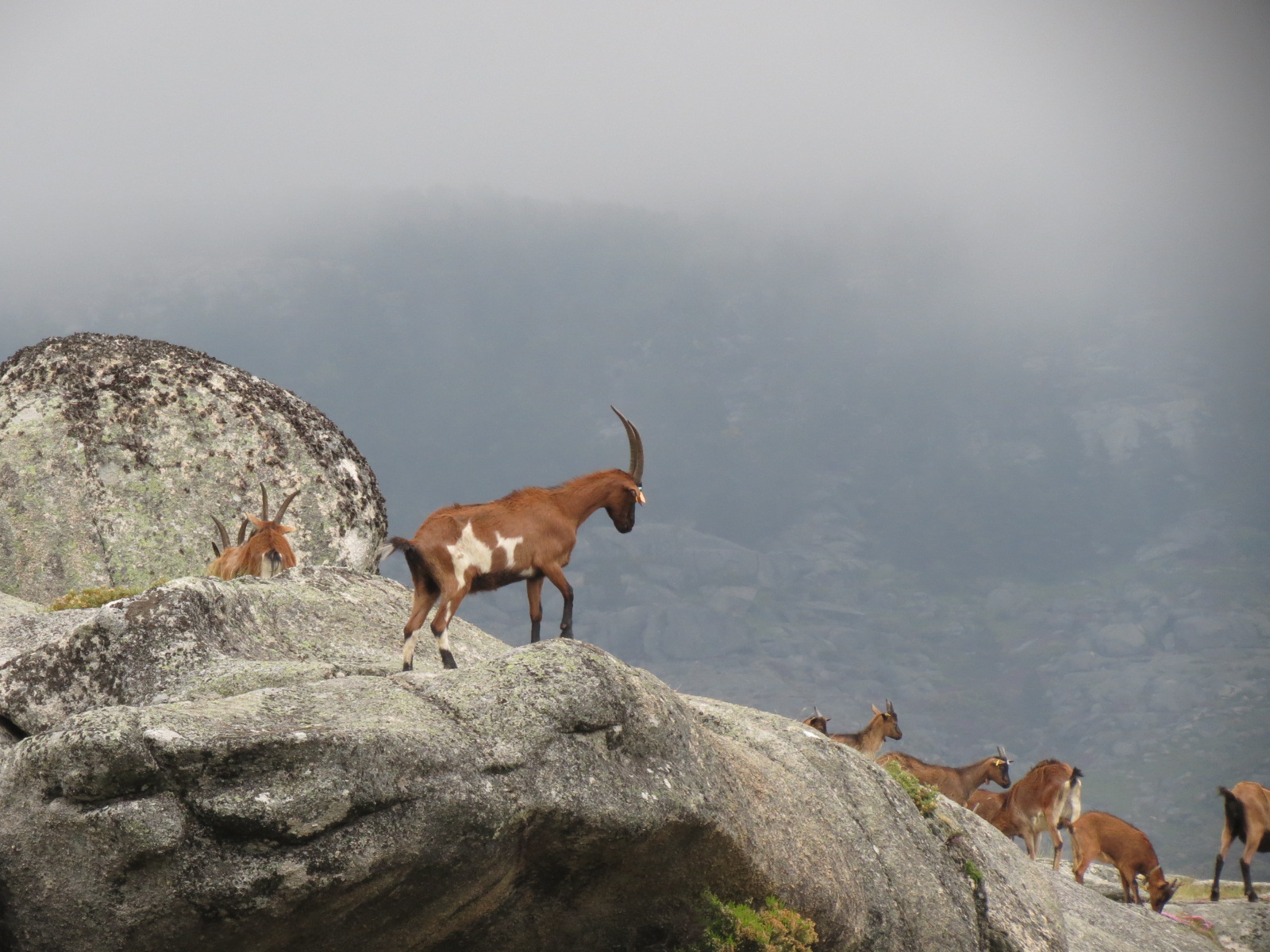
Mountain goats scrambling along rocky hilltops within the park

Oak trees dominate the major elevated areas, especially along the banks of the river, along with species of Common hazel (Corylus avellana), holly (Ilex aquifolium), chestnut, and laurel, forming mixed forests that include rare plants such as Sundew (Drosera rotundifolia), a species of carnivorous plant found in the moist lands along the riverfront.

The Olo River is rich in trout and is populated by the Eurasian otter (Lutra lutra).

Throughout the region, bird populations are diverse and include nesting pairs of Golden eagles. Mammal populations are marked by the presence of Wild boar (Sus scrofa), Roe deer (Capreolus capreolus), European badger (Meles meles), Granada hare (Lepus granatensis) and European rabbit (Oryctolagus cuniculus).

Among reptiles in the area are the Iberian emerald lizard (Lacerta schreiberi) and the Latastei viper (Vipera latastei).

=== Human geography ===
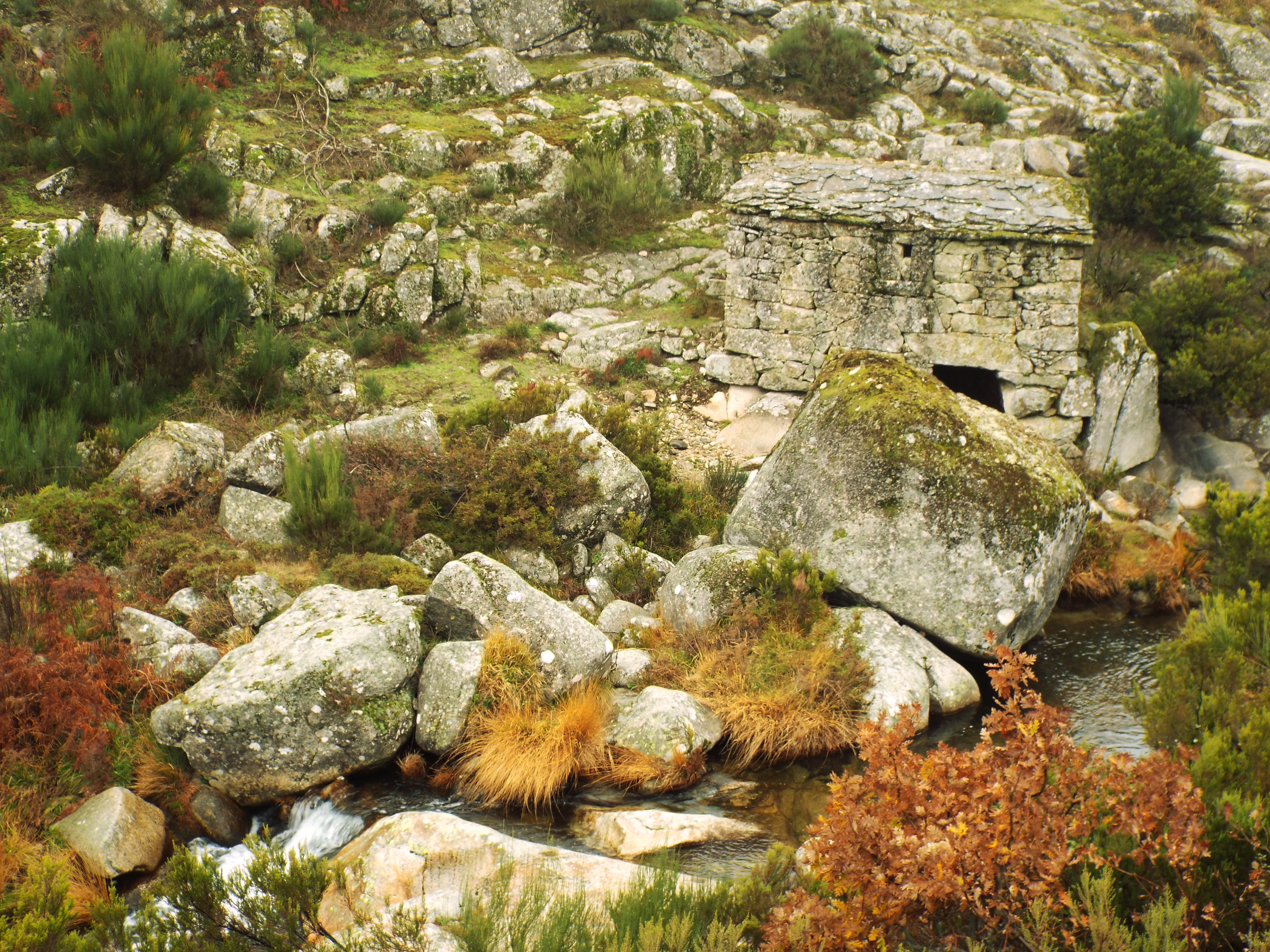
An abandoned watermill along the waterway of Alvão

The traditional architecture of the region is a distinct mountain style, especially in Ermelo and Lamas de Olo, influenced by the sociological and artesanal nature of the landscape, or in Fervença, influenced by agrarian necessity along a terraced landscape.
