= Luísa Dacosta =

Portuguese writer (1927–2015)

Luísa Dacosta

Luísa Dacosta (16 February 1927, in Vila Real as Maria Luísa Pinto Saraiva dos Santos – 15 February 2015, in Matosinhos) was a Portuguese writer. In 2010 she was awarded the Vergílio Ferreira Prize by the University of Evora.

== Career ==
From 1944 to 1947 she attended the Faculty of Arts of the University of Lisbon, where she completed the course of history and philosophy, becoming a Portuguese Language teacher in schools in Porto. In 1955 she published her first book, Província (Province), which contains a preface, three stories and seven original illustrations by the painter Carlos Botelho. In the field of short stories, she also wrote Vovó Ana, Bisavó Filomena e Eu (Grandma Ana, Great-grandma Filomena and Me) in 1969 and Corpo Recusado (Refused Body) in 1985. She also published two chronicles, A-Ver-o-Mar in 1980 and Morrer a Ocidente (Dying in the West) in 1990. The chronicles take place in the village of A Ver-o-Mar, part of Póvoa de Varzim and she has written that "my universities were the women of A Ver-o-Mar". Dacosta wrote a short story set in this village, Nos Jardins do Mar (In the Sea Gardens) in 1983 with original illustrations by Jorge Pinheiro, and even a poetry book A Maresia eo Sargaço dos Dias (The Sea Spray and the Sargassum of the Days), in 2002. Her diary, considered essential to the understanding of her work, was published in two volumes, Na Água do Tempo (In the Water of Time – 1992) and Um Olhar Naufragado (A Shipwrecked Look – 2008). She also wrote a small anthology of texts, Infância e Palavra (Childhood and Word) in 2001 and a novel O Planeta Desconhecido e Romance da que Fui Antes de Mim (The Unknown Planet and The Novel of the One Before Me) in 2000.

Dacosta published in several newspapers and magazines, including Comércio do Porto and Jornal de Notícias. She also translated Nathalie Sarraute and Simone de Beauvoir into Portuguese.

== Awards and honours ==
Dacosta was awarded the Calouste Gulbenkian Prize for Children's Literature in 1994 for her work Lá vai uma… lá vai duas.. (There goes one.... there goes two) She received the Medal of Merit from the city of Porto and, in 2002, the Uma Vida Uma Obra Prize from the Association of Journalists and Men of Letters of Porto. In 2004, on the occasion of the thirtieth anniversary of the Carnation Revolution and the 150th anniversary of the death of the Portuguese poet, playwright and novelist, Almeida Garrett, she was one of several personalities from Porto distinguished by the Cooperativa Artística Árvore for their work over the previous three decades. Dacosta was given an award for her contribution to Education. She was also awarded the Máxima Prize for her diary volume Na Água do Tempo and the Vergílio Ferreira Prize in 2010, granted by the University of Évora, for her entire body of work.

== Bibliography ==
=== Fiction ===
- 1955 – Província
- 1969 – Vovó Ana, Bisavó Filomena e Eu
- 1980 – A-Ver-o-Mar
- 1981 – Nos Jardins do Mar
- 1985 – Corpo Recusado
- 1990 – Morrer a Ocidente
- 1995 – Os Magos Que Não Chegaram a Belém
- 2000 – O Planeta Desconhecido e Romance da que Fui Antes de Mim
- 2002 – Natal com Aleluia

=== Poetry ===
- 2001 – Infância e Palavra
- 2002 – A Maresia e o Sargaço dos Dias
- 2004 – Árvore
- 2006 – As suas raízes estão na terra

=== Diaries ===
- 1992 – Na Água do Tempo
- 2002 – Um Olhar Naufragado

=== Essays ===
- 1959 – Aspectos do Burguesismo Literário
- 1960 – Notas de Crítica Literária
- 1974 – O Valor Pedagógico da Sessão de Leitura
- 1983 – Prefácio a Raúl Brandão
- 1985 – A Batalha de Aljubarrota

Books for children " O Elefante cor de Rosa" "Menina Coração de Pássaro" "Robertices" "A rapariga e o sonho" "História com recadinho" "O ratinho poeta"
