= Vila Real =

City in Trás-os-Montes, northern Portugal

- City, municipality, and district capital
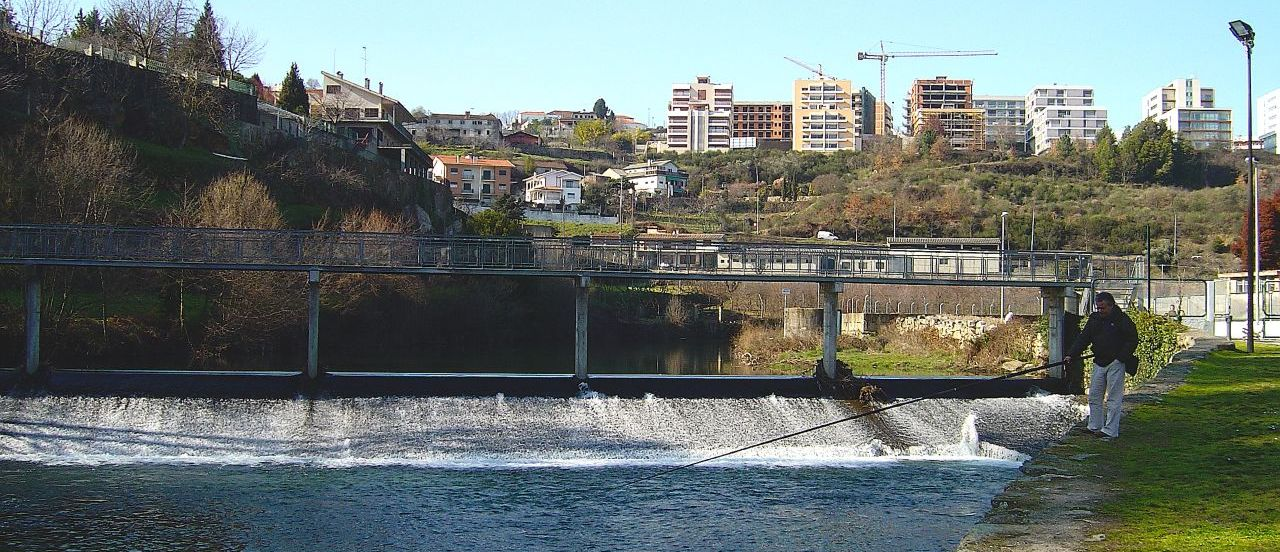
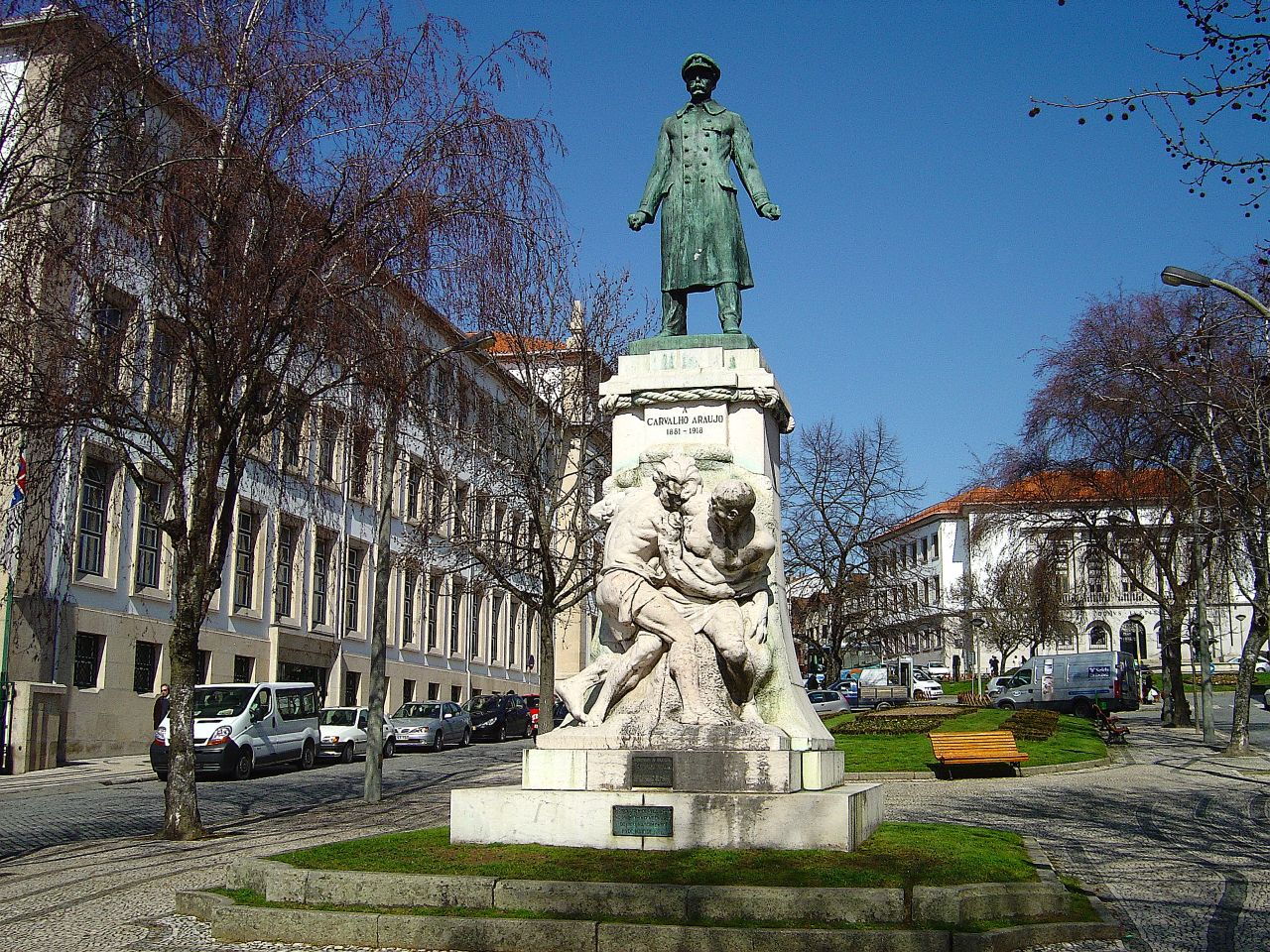
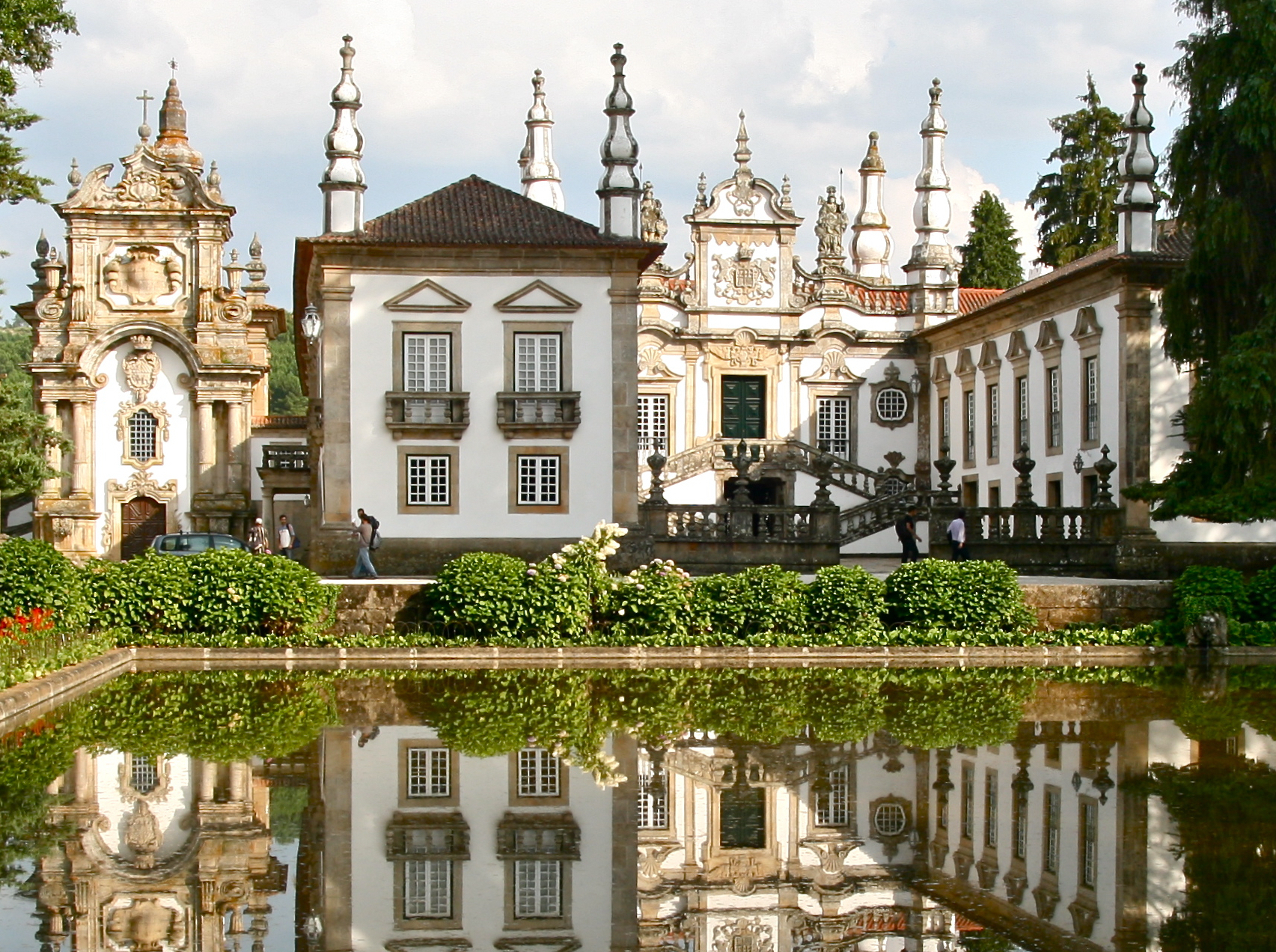
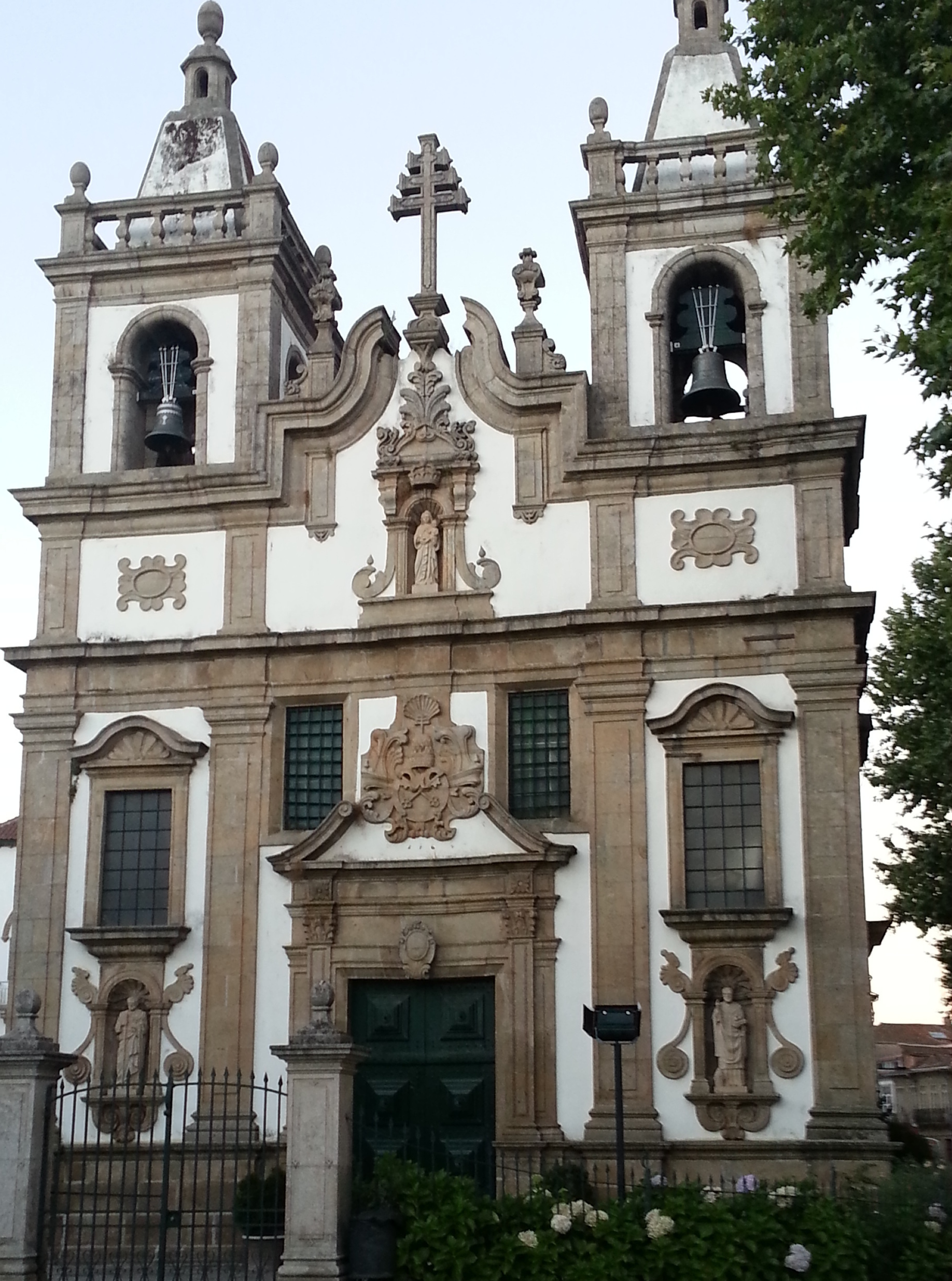
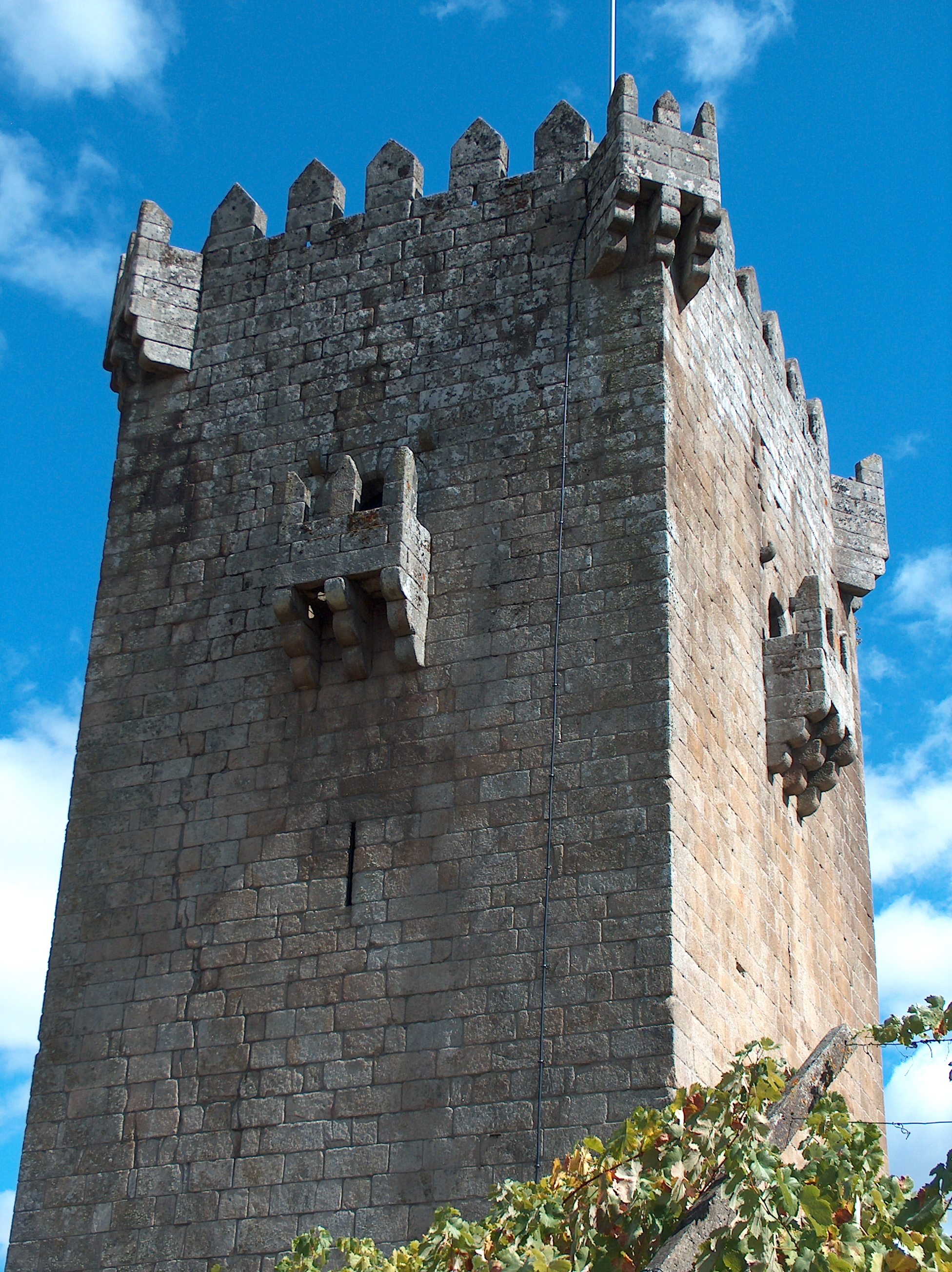
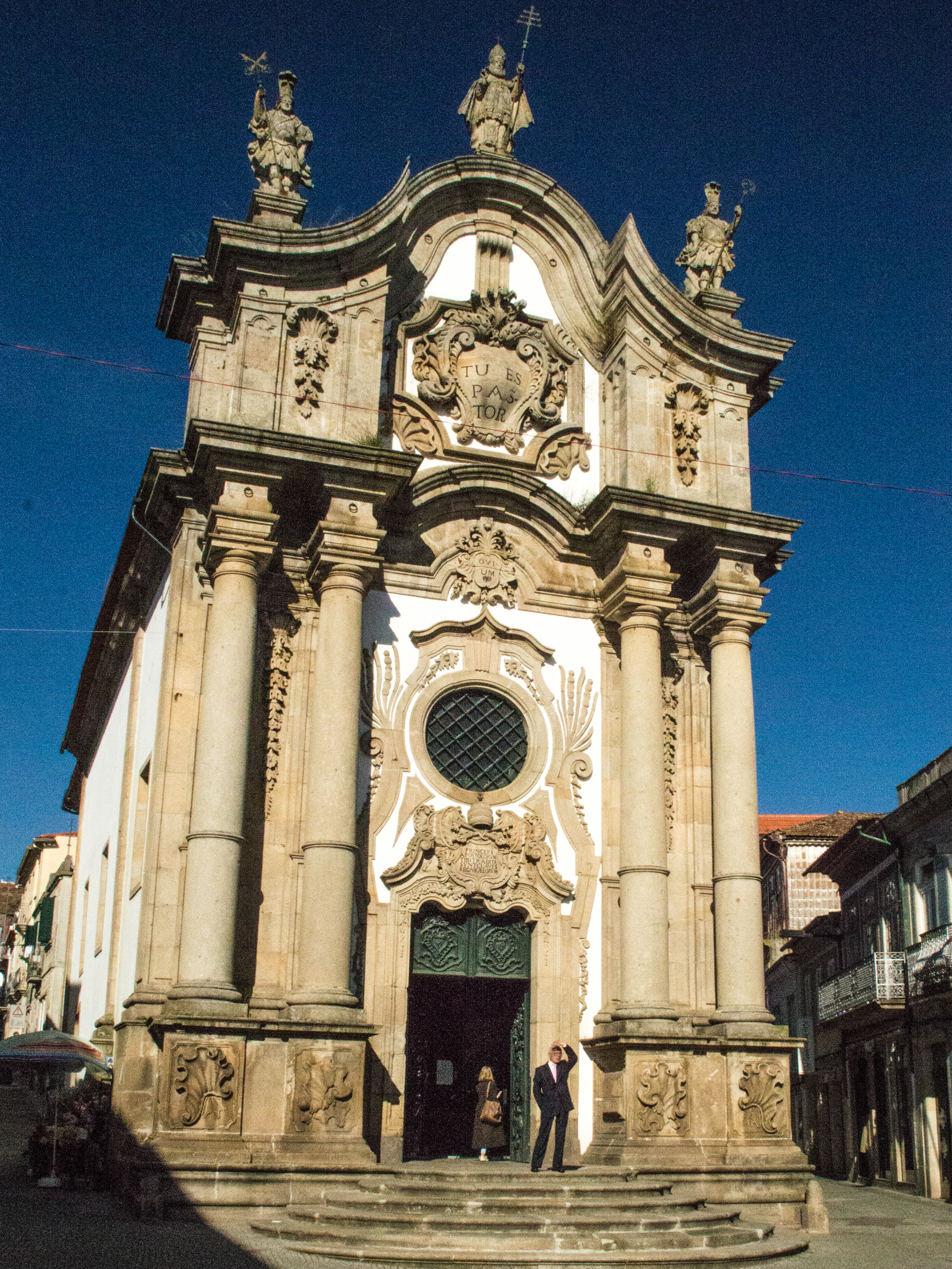
- From top left to right: The River Corgo near Codessais, Carvalho Araújo statue in the homonymous avenue, Mateus Palace, St. Peter's Church, Quintela Tower and St. Paul's Church (New Chapel).

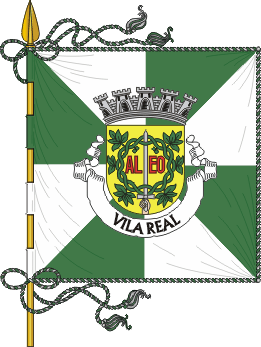
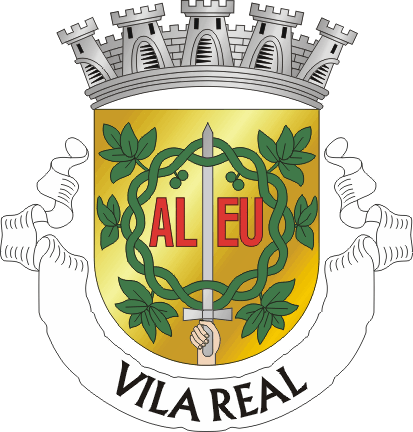
- Flag Coat of arms
- Interactive map of Vila Real
- Location within Portugal
- Coordinates: 41°17′45″N 07°44′46″W
- Country: Portugal
- Region: Northern Portugal
- Intermunicipal community: Douro
- District: Vila Real
- Historical province: Trás-os-Montes e Alto Douro (1936 map)/ Trás-os-Montes (pre-1835)
- Established: 7 December 1272
- Municipality: 4 January 1289
- Manueline charter: 22 June 1515
- City status: 20 July 1925
- Civil parishes: 20

Government
  - Type: Municipality (LAU)
  - Body: Câmara Municipal (executive); Municipal Assembly (deliberative)
  - Mayor (2025-2029): Alexandre Favaios (PS)
  - President of the Assembly: Rui Gonçalves dos Santos (PS)

Area
  - Total: 378.80 km^{2} (146.26 sq mi)
  - City-proper (INE): 39.22 km^{2} (15.14 sq mi)
- Elevation: 450 m (1,480 ft)

Population (2021)
  - Total: 49,574
  - Density: 130.87/km^{2} (338.95/sq mi)
  - City-proper (INE): 29,201
  - City-proper (INE) density: 744.5/km^{2} (1,928/sq mi)
- Demonym: vila-realense
- Time zone: UTC+00:00 (WET)
  - Summer (DST): UTC+01:00 (WEST)
- Postal code: 5000
- Area code: 259
- Dicofre code: 1714
- Patron saint: Our Lady of the Immaculate Conception
- Municipal holiday: 13 June (Saint Anthony)
- Website: https://www.cm-vilareal.pt/

Vila Real (Portuguese pronunciation: [ˈvilɐ ʁiˈal]) is a city and municipality in the Northern region of Portugal. The capital and largest city of the Vila Real District, it is also the seat of the Douro intermunicipal community and the historical province of Trás-os-Montes e Alto Douro. The municipality covers an area of 378.80 square kilometres (146.26 sq mi) and is home to an estimated population of 49,574 (2021), of which about 30,000 live in the urban area (2021).

The city is located on a plateau 450 m (1,510 ft) high, over the promontory formed by the gorges of the Corgo and Cabril rivers, where the oldest part of town (Vila Velha) is located, framed by the escarpments of the Corgo gorge. The Alvão and Marão mountains overlook the town on the northwest and southwest side, respectively, rising up to 1,400 m (4,600 ft). With over seven hundred years of existence, the city was once known as the "royal court of Trás-os-Montes" (Corte Real de Trás-os-Montes) due to the high number of manors bearing coats of arms and family crests, attesting the presence of noble figures that established in the city by influence of the Marquis of Vila Real, the most powerful aristocratic house in Portugal, during the 16th and 17th centuries, after the Dukes of Braganza and the Dukes of Aveiro. Many of these family crests are still visible today in the manors spread throughout the old city and in the Carreira Garden.

Vila Real was ranked seventh in the list of Portugal's most livable cities in the survey of living conditions published by the Portuguese newspaper Expresso in 2007.

== History ==
The region shows traces of inhabitation during the Paleolithic era, while the settlement of Panóias and the Panóias Sanctuary had a Roman presence. However, with the barbaric and Muslim invasions there was a gradual depopulation.

At the end of the 11th century, in 1096, Henry, Count of Portugal wrote a foral, a royal document whose purpose was to establish and regulate a town, establishing Constantim de Panóias (now the city's neighbouring village of Constantim) as a way to repopulate the region, although it never took the intended effect. Consequently, on 7 December 1272, as a new incentive of populating and consolidating the area namely in relation to royal taxation, King Afonso III of Portugal wrote another charter, this time to establish a town with the name of Vila Real de Panóias. Named for its royal establishment, literally meaning "Royal Town", its document was of limited and mixed success, in part due to the abuse of the local nobility and thus required further intervention.

In 1289, on the 4 January, a second charter was granted at the town by King Denis of Portugal. Among its many clauses seeking to resolve issues, it also establishes the concelho or municipality of Vila Real. It would be followed by a third charter shortly after, on 24 February 1293, after locals negotiated for fairer terms. As part of the charter reforms undertaken during the reign of Manuel I, Vila Real receisved another charter on 22 June 1515.

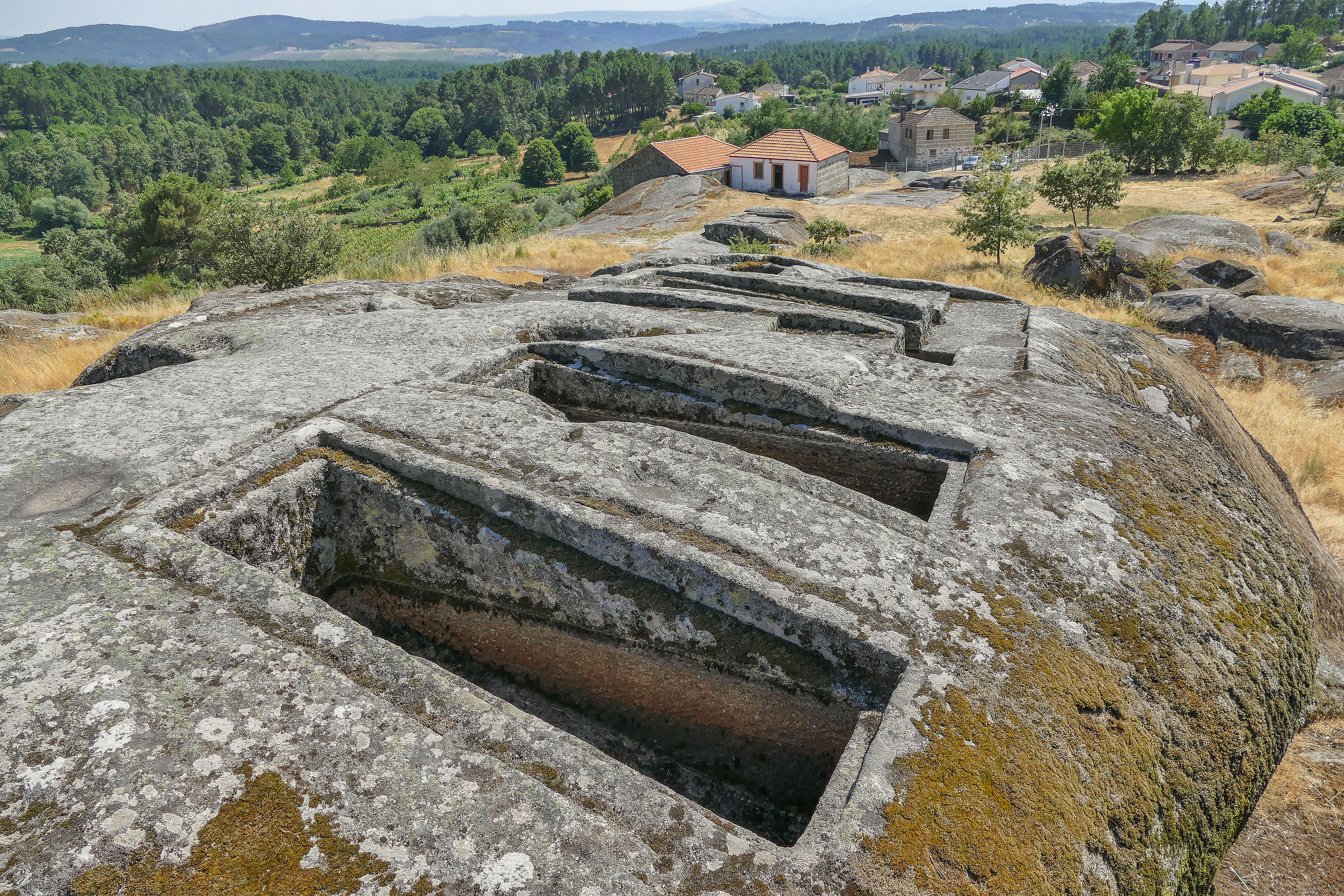
The Roman period Panóias Sanctuary, Vale de Nogueiras

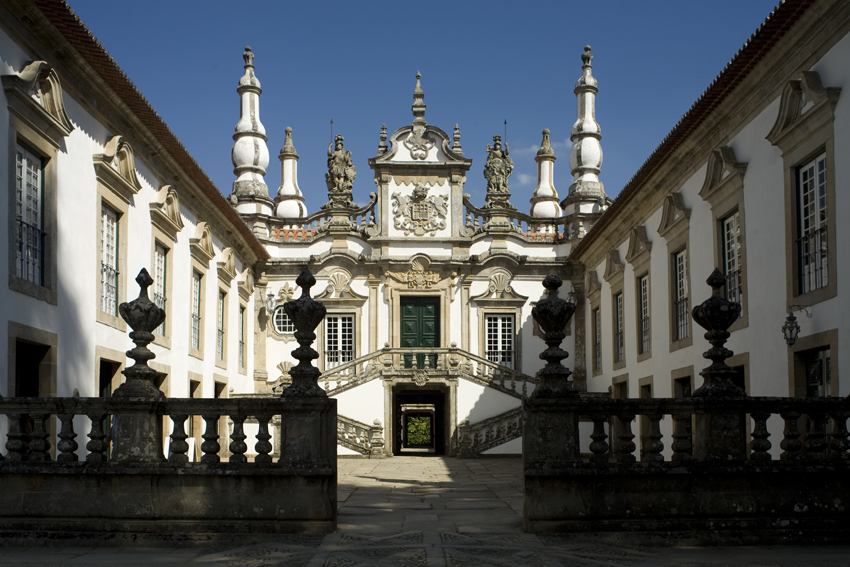
The 18th century Baroque Mateus Palace or Casa de Mateus, Mateus on the city's outskirts

Vila Real's privileged location at the crossroad between the Porto-Bragança and Viseu-Chaves roads allowed for a sustained growth over the centuries. Starting from the 17th century, the House of Vila Real attracted the nobility to an extent that during that time the city housed more members of the royal family than any other settlement in Portugal except the capital in Lisbon, and family coats of arms remain above old houses and manors, some of which are still occupied by those families.

Vineyards were introduced to the municipality in 1764, growing red, white and rosé wines for export. Despite its royal presence, Vila Real remained with the status of town until the increase in population in the 19th century, which led to it gaining the status of capital of the Vila Real District and the historic province of Trás-os-Montes e Alto Douro. The Roman Catholic Diocese of Vila Real was created in 1922 from the dioceses of Bragança-Miranda, Braga and Lamego and Vila Real finally gained city status under the Portuguese Republic in 1925.

It was the fourth Portuguese city to have public supply of electricity, but it was the first to produce hydroelectric power, from 1894 to 1926 in the Biel Hydroelectric Power Plant, located near the Corgo River, named after Karl Emil Biel.

The city experienced a great development with the establishment of the University of Trás-os-Montes and Alto Douro in 1986, succeeding the Polytechnic Institute of Vila Real created in 1973, contributing to an increase and revitalization of the population. In 2017 there were 6 651 students enrolled in higher education.

The Bairro dos Ferreiros neighbourhood, under the Vila Real Metallic Bridge, was one of several rehabilitated areas of the city

In the last couple of years, several cultural facilities were built, such as the Vila Real Theater, the Vila Velha Museum, the Sound and Image Museum, the Regional Conservatory of Music and the transfer of the Dr. Júlio Teixeira Public Library and Municipal Archive to new buildings, bringing some dynamism and progress to the city. Various areas of the city have also been rehabilitated, such as the Centro Histórico, the Vila Velha and traditional typical neighbourhoods like Bairro dos Ferreiros and Bairro de São Vicente de Paulo. The area surrounding the Corgo River has also been rehabilitated, becoming the Corgo Park, the Forest Park and the Codessais Recreational Complex, including cultural components as the Vila Real Science Center and the Urban Ecology Agency.

Nowadays the city experiences a phase of growing industrial and commercial development, aimed at health, education and tourism, presenting itself as an attractive place for foreign investment, being internationally known by the Circuito Internacional de Vila Real, the street circuit used for the FIA WTCR Race of Portugal, one of the events of the World Touring Car Cup.

== Coat of arms ==
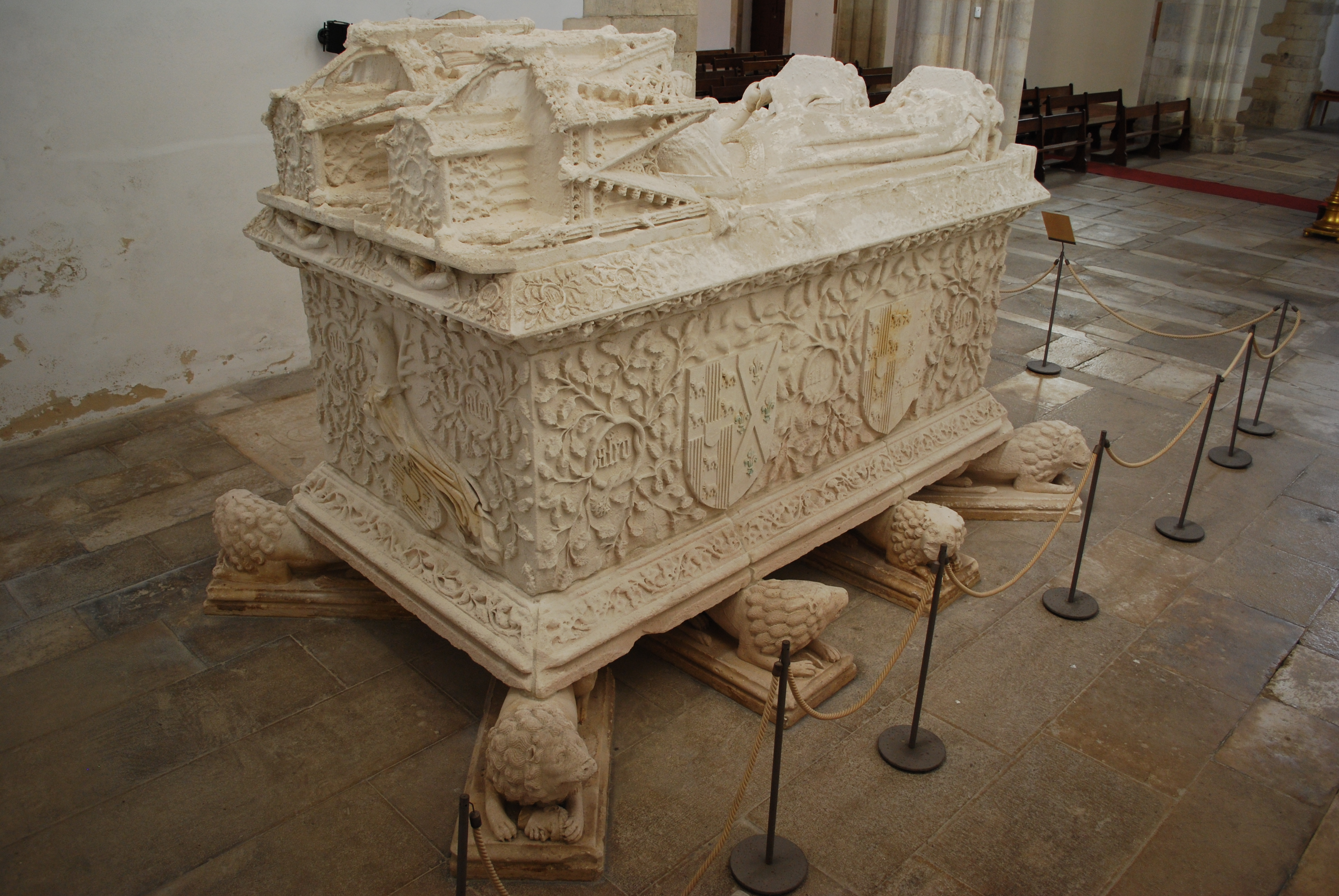
Tomb of Pedro de Menezes, in the Igreja da Graça in Santarém.

The coat of arms of Vila Real - a sword embedded in a wreath of zambujeiro (wild olive tree) and the slogan Aleu - is derived from the decorative motif of the tomb of Pedro de Menezes, 1st Count of Vila Real, found in the Igreja da Graça in Santarém. 'Aleu' or 'aleo' is an old Portuguese term for a 'gaming stick' (as used in hockey or shuffleboard). It refers to a famous episode concerning Pedro de Menezes from shortly after the Conquest of Ceuta on September 2, 1415 (commemorated on Ceuta Day). Pedro de Menezes was engaged in an outdoor game in the king's presence when a messenger arrived reporting an imminent Moroccan attack on Portuguese-held Ceuta. Menezes is said to have raised his gaming stick (aleo) and told the king that "with that stick alone" he could defend Ceuta from all the power of Morocco. Similar design can be seen on the coat of arms of Alcoutim, where Pedro's descendants were made Count's of Alcoutim.

== Population ==
Number of inhabitants
| 1864 | 1878 | 1890 | 1900 | 1911 | 1920 | 1930 | 1940 | 1950 | 1960 | 1970 | 1981 | 1991 | 2001 | 2011 | 2021 |
| 32 146 | 33 489 | 34 032 | 35 976 | 37 111 | 34 952 | 37 951 | 43 142 | 46 782 | 47 773 | 44 550 | 47 020 | 46 300 | 49 957 | 51 850 | 49 574 |

(Observation: Number of resident inhabitants, that is, that had their official residency in Vila Real at the time of the census.)

Number of inhabitants by Age Group
| | 1900 | 1911 | 1920 | 1930 | 1940 | 1950 | 1960 | 1970 | 1981 | 1991 | 2001 | 2011 |
| 0-14 Anos | 12 541 | 13 642 | 12 383 | 13 100 | 15 080 | 15 603 | 16 164 | 14 940 | 13 566 | 9 803 | 8 075 | 7 714 |
| 15-24 Anos | 7 008 | 6 557 | 6 438 | 7 126 | 8 126 | 8 964 | 8 561 | 8 125 | 8 786 | 8 425 | 7 516 | 5 639 |
| 25-64 Anos | 14 580 | 14 806 | 13 920 | 14 998 | 17 056 | 18 924 | 19 744 | 18 085 | 19 741 | 22 129 | 26 631 | 29 156 |
| = ou > 65 Anos | 1 845 | 2 085 | 2 064 | 2 075 | 2 349 | 2 992 | 3 304 | 3 400 | 4 927 | 5 943 | 7 735 | 9 341 |
| > Id. desconh | 78 | 88 | 187 | 92 | 191 | | | | | | | |

(Observation: From 1900 to 1950 the data refers to the de facto population, that was present in Vila Real at the time of the census.)

== Climate ==
Vila Real has a Mediterranean climate (Köppen: Csb/Csa) with warm to hot dry summers and cool wet winters.

Located in a promontory formed by the gorges of the Corgo and Cabril rivers, Vila Real sits at 460 m (1,510 ft) altitude. The Alvão and Marão mountains overlook the town on the northwest and southwest side, respectively, rising up to 1,400 m (4,600 ft).

Due to the geographical location, its climate is a mix between Mediterranean and oceanic, with some continental influences. Winters are long, with negative temperatures and frequent frosts. Snowfall usually occurs once or twice each year.

Climate data for Vila Real, elevation: 561 m or 1,841 ft, 1991-2020 normals and extremes
| Month | Jan | Feb | Mar | Apr | May | Jun | Jul | Aug | Sep | Oct | Nov | Dec | Year |
|---|---|---|---|---|---|---|---|---|---|---|---|---|---|
| Record high °C (°F) | 19.0 (66.2) | 22.0 (71.6) | 25.9 (78.6) | 29.8 (85.6) | 34.0 (93.2) | 39.1 (102.4) | 39.8 (103.6) | 40.2 (104.4) | 39.1 (102.4) | 32.2 (90.0) | 22.6 (72.7) | 19.5 (67.1) | 40.2 (104.4) |
| Mean daily maximum °C (°F) | 9.9 (49.8) | 12.2 (54.0) | 15.6 (60.1) | 17.4 (63.3) | 21.2 (70.2) | 25.3 (77.5) | 28.8 (83.8) | 29.0 (84.2) | 25.2 (77.4) | 19.3 (66.7) | 13.2 (55.8) | 10.4 (50.7) | 19.0 (66.1) |
| Daily mean °C (°F) | 6.3 (43.3) | 7.9 (46.2) | 10.6 (51.1) | 12.2 (54.0) | 15.4 (59.7) | 18.9 (66.0) | 21.8 (71.2) | 21.9 (71.4) | 19.1 (66.4) | 14.7 (58.5) | 9.6 (49.3) | 7.0 (44.6) | 13.8 (56.8) |
| Mean daily minimum °C (°F) | 2.8 (37.0) | 3.5 (38.3) | 5.6 (42.1) | 7.1 (44.8) | 9.7 (49.5) | 12.6 (54.7) | 14.7 (58.5) | 14.9 (58.8) | 13.0 (55.4) | 10.1 (50.2) | 6.0 (42.8) | 3.6 (38.5) | 8.6 (47.5) |
| Record low °C (°F) | −6.3 (20.7) | −4.2 (24.4) | −5.7 (21.7) | −1.4 (29.5) | 0.0 (32.0) | 4.0 (39.2) | 7.0 (44.6) | 7.0 (44.6) | 4.8 (40.6) | 0.9 (33.6) | −3.4 (25.9) | −3.9 (25.0) | −6.3 (20.7) |
| Average precipitation mm (inches) | 129.4 (5.09) | 83.6 (3.29) | 91.1 (3.59) | 84.8 (3.34) | 63.4 (2.50) | 29.2 (1.15) | 12.7 (0.50) | 21.5 (0.85) | 48.9 (1.93) | 120.9 (4.76) | 122.8 (4.83) | 142.8 (5.62) | 951.2 (37.45) |
| Average precipitation days (≥ 1 mm) | 11.4 | 8.5 | 8.8 | 10.3 | 8.5 | 4.0 | 2.3 | 2.3 | 5.2 | 10.0 | 11.2 | 10.5 | 92.8 |
| Mean monthly sunshine hours | 105.3 | 120.0 | 177.7 | 187.7 | 233.3 | 282.4 | 327.8 | 319.3 | 231.7 | 170.2 | 133.5 | 100.1 | 2,389 |
Source: Instituto de Meteorologia (sunshine hours from 1971-1990)

Climate data for Vila Real, elevation: 481 m or 1,578 ft, 1971-1991 normals and extremes
| Month | Jan | Feb | Mar | Apr | May | Jun | Jul | Aug | Sep | Oct | Nov | Dec | Year |
|---|---|---|---|---|---|---|---|---|---|---|---|---|---|
| Record high °C (°F) | 17.8 (64.0) | 22.0 (71.6) | 26.1 (79.0) | 28.1 (82.6) | 32.2 (90.0) | 37.5 (99.5) | 39.8 (103.6) | 40.2 (104.4) | 38.3 (100.9) | 30.9 (87.6) | 22.3 (72.1) | 19.5 (67.1) | 40.2 (104.4) |
| Mean daily maximum °C (°F) | 9.5 (49.1) | 11.8 (53.2) | 14.5 (58.1) | 16.4 (61.5) | 19.7 (67.5) | 25.0 (77.0) | 28.7 (83.7) | 28.7 (83.7) | 26.0 (78.8) | 18.9 (66.0) | 13.6 (56.5) | 10.4 (50.7) | 18.6 (65.5) |
| Daily mean °C (°F) | 5.8 (42.4) | 7.7 (45.9) | 9.5 (49.1) | 11.3 (52.3) | 14.1 (57.4) | 18.6 (65.5) | 21.5 (70.7) | 21.3 (70.3) | 19.4 (66.9) | 14.0 (57.2) | 9.5 (49.1) | 7.0 (44.6) | 13.3 (56.0) |
| Mean daily minimum °C (°F) | 2.1 (35.8) | 3.5 (38.3) | 4.6 (40.3) | 6.2 (43.2) | 8.5 (47.3) | 12.2 (54.0) | 14.4 (57.9) | 13.9 (57.0) | 12.7 (54.9) | 9.0 (48.2) | 5.4 (41.7) | 3.5 (38.3) | 8.0 (46.4) |
| Record low °C (°F) | −6.5 (20.3) | −6.3 (20.7) | −3.6 (25.5) | −2.0 (28.4) | 0.0 (32.0) | 4.0 (39.2) | 7.5 (45.5) | 6.2 (43.2) | 2.4 (36.3) | −0.8 (30.6) | −3.4 (25.9) | −5.0 (23.0) | −6.5 (20.3) |
| Average rainfall mm (inches) | 141.1 (5.56) | 158.7 (6.25) | 82.6 (3.25) | 82.3 (3.24) | 66.5 (2.62) | 54.1 (2.13) | 17.1 (0.67) | 17.1 (0.67) | 49.0 (1.93) | 116.9 (4.60) | 110.7 (4.36) | 174.6 (6.87) | 1,070.7 (42.15) |
| Average rainy days (≥ 0.1 mm) | 14.9 | 14.1 | 13.0 | 13.8 | 11.9 | 8.5 | 4.6 | 4.0 | 6.8 | 12.7 | 11.7 | 13.7 | 129.7 |
| Mean monthly sunshine hours | 105.3 | 120.0 | 177.7 | 187.7 | 233.3 | 282.4 | 327.8 | 319.3 | 231.7 | 170.2 | 133.5 | 100.1 | 2,389 |
Source: Instituto de Meteorologia

== Civil parishes ==
Vila Real's municipality consists of 20 freguesias or civil parishes, which are not all coexistent with the ecclesiastical parishes or paróquias. The civil parish Vila Real (Nossa Senhora da Conceição, São Pedro e São Dinis) is officially the city of Vila Real.

Administratively, the municipality is divided into 20 civil parishes (freguesias):

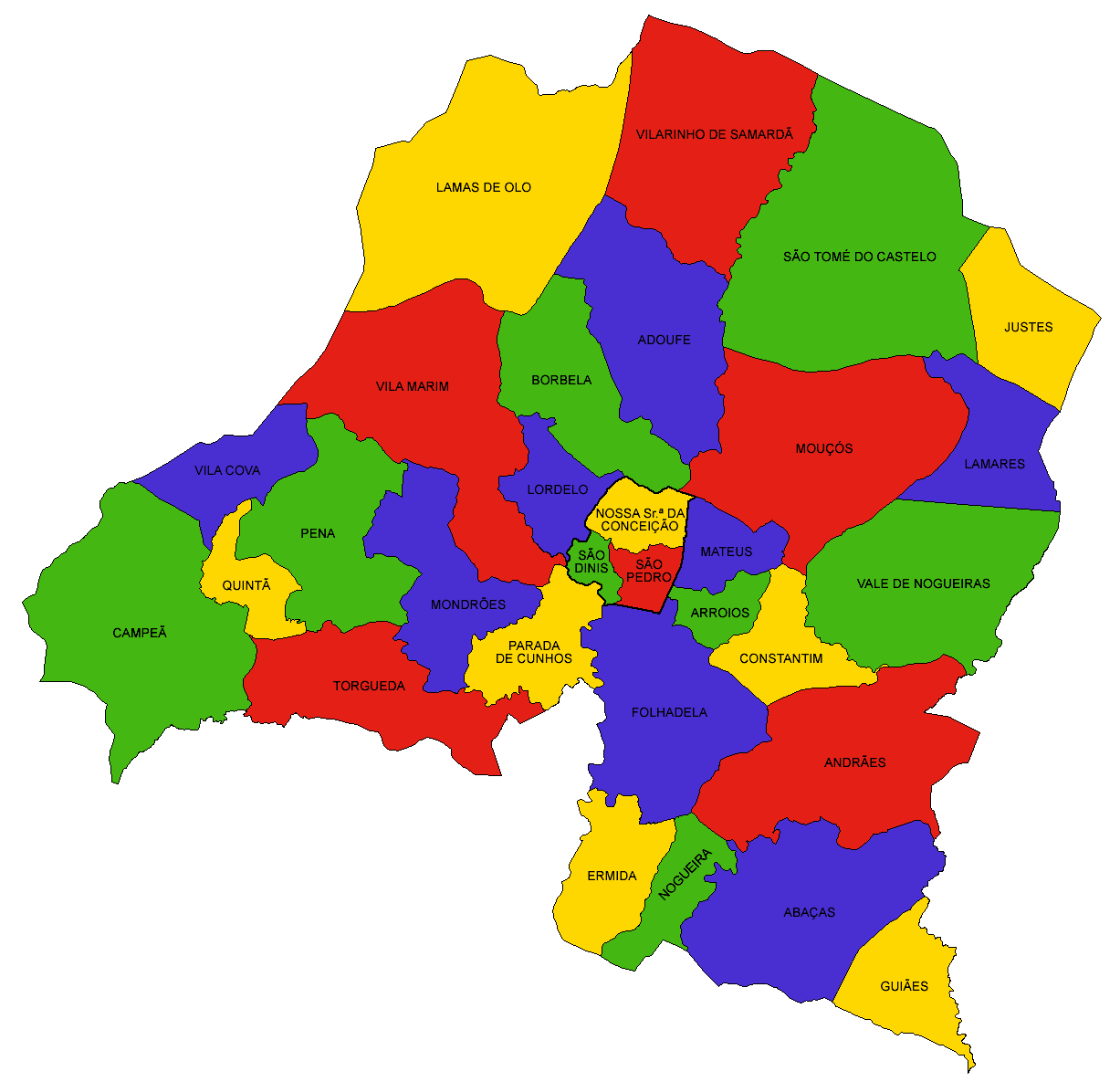
Civil parishes of Vila Real before 2013

- Abaças
- Adoufe e Vilarinho de Samardã
- Andrães
- Arroios
- Borbela e Lamas de Olo
- Campeã
- Constantim e Vale de Nogueiras
- Folhadela
- Guiães
- Lordelo
- Mateus
- Mondrões
- Mouçós e Lamares
- Nogueira e Ermida
- Parada de Cunhos
- Pena, Quintã e Vila Cova
- São Tomé do Castelo e Justes
- Torgueda
- Vila Marim
- Vila Real (Nossa Senhora da Conceição, São Pedro e São Dinis)

== Infrastructure ==
=== Museums and cultural facilities ===
- Archaeology and Numismatic Museum
- Vila Velha Museum
- Professor Fernando Real Geology Museum at the University of Trás-os-Montes and Alto Douro
- Ethnographic Museum
- Sound and Image Museum
- Alvão Natural Park Information and Interpretation Center
- Panoias Sanctuary Interpretation Center
- Vila Real Science Center
- Urban Ecology Agency
- Dr. Júlio Teixeira Public Library
- Vila Real Theater
- Casa de Mateus Foundation
- Municipal Archive
- Vila-Realense Literary Guild

=== Sports ===
- Codessais Recreational Complex
- Monte da Forca Sports Complex
- UTAD Sports Complex
- Abambres Sports Complex
- Engenheiro Francisco Campos Sports Complex
- Calvário Football Pitch
- Cruzeiro Stadium (Constantim)
- D. Francisco de Sousa Albuquerque Football Pitch (Mateus)
- Flores Tennis Court
- UTAD Tennis Courts
- Vila Real Tennis Club
- Corgo Park Multi Sport
- Forest Park Multi Sport
- Vila Real Sports Center
- Araucária Sports Center
- Diogo Cão Sports Center
- UTAD Sports Center
- Vila Real AMF Kartdrome
- Monte da Forca Kartdrome
- Municipal Covered Swimming Pools
- Codessais Swimming Pools
- NaturWaterPark - Douro Amusement Park
- Vila Real Rocodrome - Climbing Walls
- Walking and Running Center
- Vila Real Automobile Club
- Sport Club Vila Real is the city's football club, founded in 1920. It has played in the Portuguese third and fourth tiers, currently competing in the fourth, the Terceira Divisao.

=== Health ===
- Nuno Grande community health center (USF)
- Corgo community health center (USF)
- Fénix community health center (USF)
- Nova de Mateus community health center (USF)
- Mateus Personalized Health Care Unit (UCSP)
- Mateus UCSP - Abaças Unit
- Mateus UCSP - Torgueda Unit
- Mateus UCSP - Campeã Unit
- Mateus UCSP - Sanguinhedo Unit
- Integrated Continued Care Unit - Vila Real Santa Casa da Misericórdia
- St. Peter Hospital, part of the Hospital Center of Trás-os-Montes e Alto Douro (CHTMAD)
- Hospital da Luz - Vila Real (Private)
- Trofa Saúde - Hospital Vila Real (Private)

=== Nature ===
- UTAD Botanical Garden
- Forest Park
- Corgo Park
- Alvão Natural Park
- Alvão/Marão Site of Community Importance (Natura 2000 Network)
- Vila Real Campsite
- Mateus Palace Gardens
- Carreira Garden
- Alto Douro Wine Region, a UNESCO World Heritage Site
- Fojo Dos Lobos de Fafiao.
- MIradouro de Fafiao- Cabril
- Joao Rodrigues Cabrilho born PLace. Lapela - Cabril, Montalegre

=== Education ===
- University of Trás-os-Montes and Alto Douro
- Agostinho Roseta Technical School
- Nervir Technical School
- Camilo Castelo Branco Secondary School
- São Pedro Secondary School
- Morgado de Mateus Secondary School
- Diogo Cão Lower Secondary School
- Monsenhor Jerónimo do Amaral Lower Secondary School
- João Paulo II Private School
- São José Private School
- S. Vicente de Paulo Primary School
- Corgo Primary School
- Árvores Primary School
- Flores Primary School
- Araucária Primary School
- Douro Primary School
- Mouçós Primary School
- Lordelo Primary School
- Agarez Primary School
- Arrabães Primary School
- Mondrões Primary School
- Parada de Cunhos Primary School
- Prado Primary School
- Campeã Primary School
- Vila Marim Primary School
- Vilarinho da Samardã Primary School

=== Others ===
- Nosso Shopping Center
- Constantim Industrial Park
- Regia Douro Park - Science and Technology Park

== Main sights ==
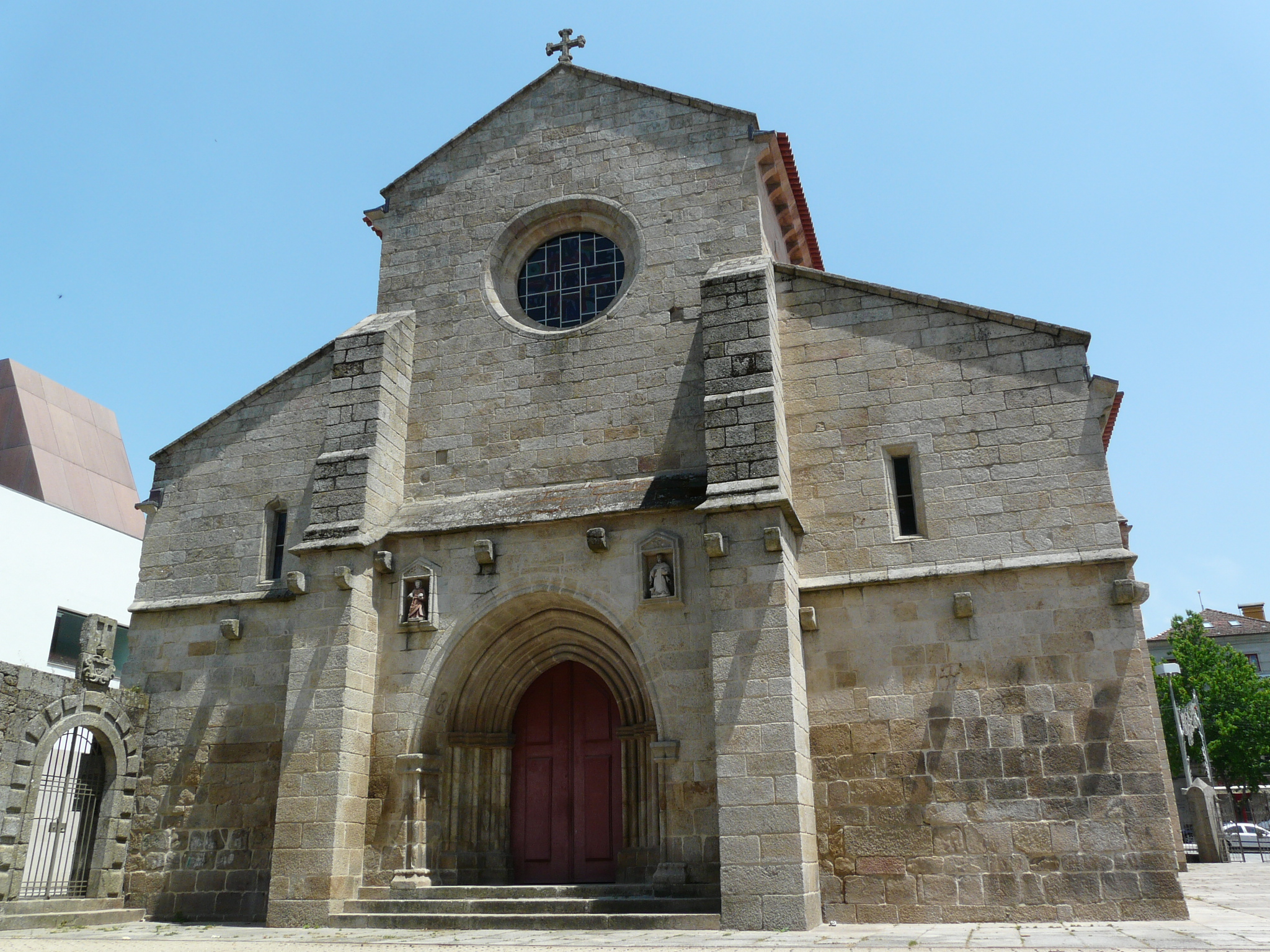
Cathedral (See) of Vila Real

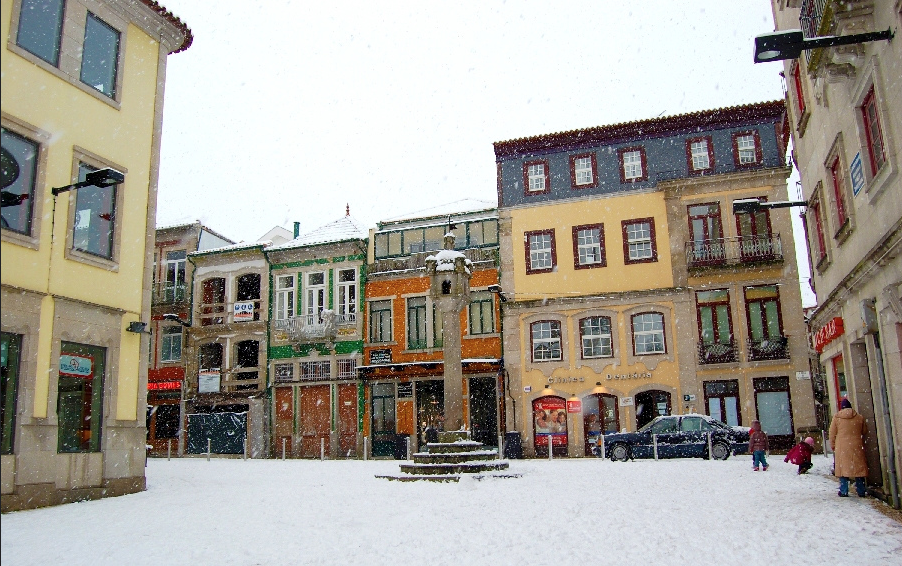
The 16th-century city pillory in its eponymous square, on a snowy day

- Capela da Misericórdia
- Capela de São Brás e o túmulo de Teixeira de Macedo
- Capela do Espírito Santo ou Capela do Bom Jesus do Hospital
- Diogo Cão's house
- Carvalho Araújo's house
- Brocas' house
- Marqueses's house de Vila Real
- Cathedral of Vila Real
- St. Peter's Church
- Bom Jesus do Calvário Church
- Clérigos's Church or "Capela Nova"
- Pelourinho de Vila Real

=== Outside the city centre ===
- Alvão Natural Park
- Mateus Palace
- Quintela Tower
- Mamoas de Justes
- Mão do Homem, in Adoufe
- São Miguel da Pena Necropolis
- Santuário de Panóias, in Vale de Nogueiras

== Transportation ==
=== Highways ===
- A24 - Connects Chaves (frontier with Galiza, Spain), to the North, and Viseu, to the South.
  - A7 - Indirect connection to Minho (Braga, Guimarães, etc.), from Vila Pouca de Aguiar, via A24.
- A4 - Main Road that connects Porto, to the West, and Bragança, Northeast and the frontier with Castilla y Leon, Spain.

=== Airfield ===
Vila Real airfield (VRL) - Located 4 km from city centre, near the Industrial Zone, in the Folhadela parish. Has a paved runway with 950×30 m. A scheduled airline service operated by Aero VIP serves some domestic destinations.

=== Railway ===
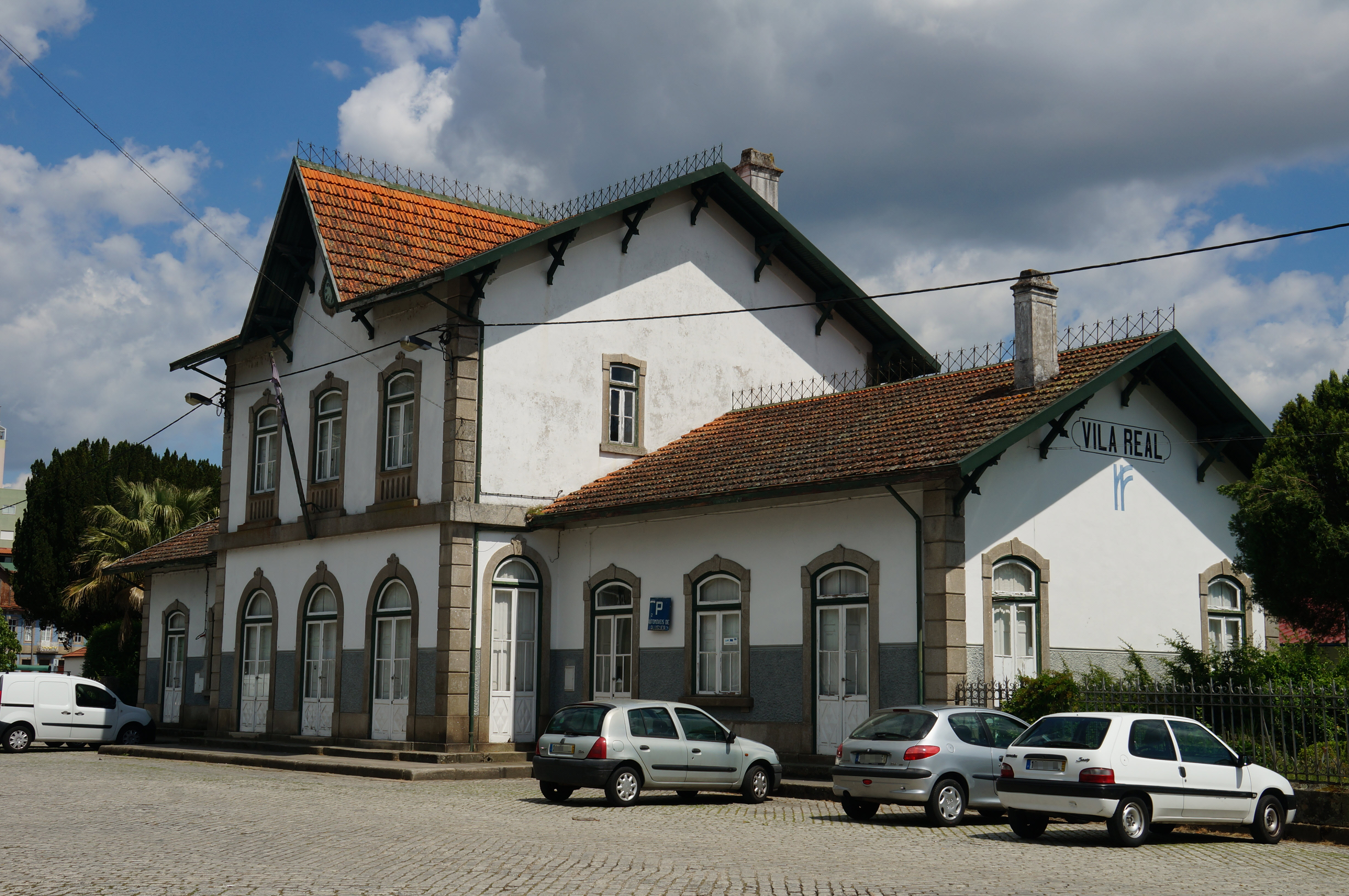
The disused Vila Real railway station on the Corgo line.

The Corgo line was a metre gauge railway that connected the city to Regua, 25 km south, in the Douro valley. It closed for renovation in 2009, but due to spending cuts by the Portuguese Government the closure has become permanent. It followed the Corgo river valley and offered splendid views to the characteristic vineyards clinging on to almost vertical. Until 1990 the Corgo line also continued north to Chaves.

=== Urban bus ===
The city bus system in Vila Real is run by Corgobus; there are 5 lines and about 1.35 million people in 2008 were transported.

=== Main distances ===
- Chaves Portugal - 68 km
- Viseu Portugal - 90 km
- Porto Portugal - 97 km
- Francisco Sá Carneiro Airport (OPO) Portugal - 100 km
- Braga Portugal - 100 km
- Bragança Portugal - 120 km
- Lisbon Portugal - 411 km
- Madrid Spain - 520 km
- Faro Portugal - 613 km

== Twin towns – sister cities ==
Vila Real is twinned with:

- Osnabrück, Germany
- Ourense, Spain
- Grasse, France
- Mende, France
- Espinho, Portugal

== Notable people ==
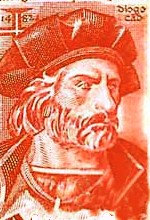
Portrait of Diogo Cão

- Diogo Cão (c. 1452 – c. 1486), explorer and navigator of the Age of Discovery
- Luís Vaz Pereira Pinto Guedes (1770–1841), brigadier on the absolutist side in Portugal's Liberal Wars & 2nd Viscount of Montalegre
- António Lopes Mendes (1835–1894), explorer, agronomist in Brazil and India, illustrator and cartographer
- José Augusto Alves Roçadas (1865–1926) general, colonial governor in Angola and Macau
- Carvalho Araújo (1881–1918), Navy officer, colonial administrator and politician
- Luísa Dacosta (1927–2015), writer
- Francisco Seixas da Costa (born 1948), diplomat

=== Sport ===
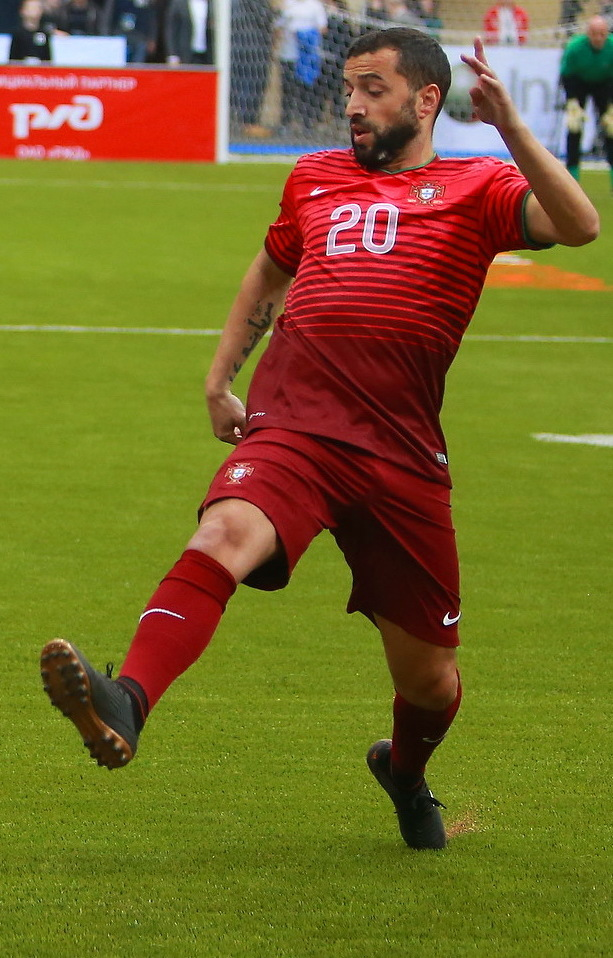
Simão Sabrosa

- Paulo Alves, (born 1969), footballer
- Jaime Linares (born 1982), Angolan footballer
- Norberto Mourão (born 1980), paracanoeist, bronze medallist at the 2020 Summer Paralympics
- Vítor Murta (born 1979), footballer
- Ana Sofia Nóbrega (born 1990), Angolan swimmer
- André Pires (born 1989), motorcycle racer
- Jorge Rodrigues (born 1982), footballer
- Simão Sabrosa (born 1979), footballer
- Schuster (Rui Miguel Mateus Teixeira, born 1978) footballer

== Gallery ==
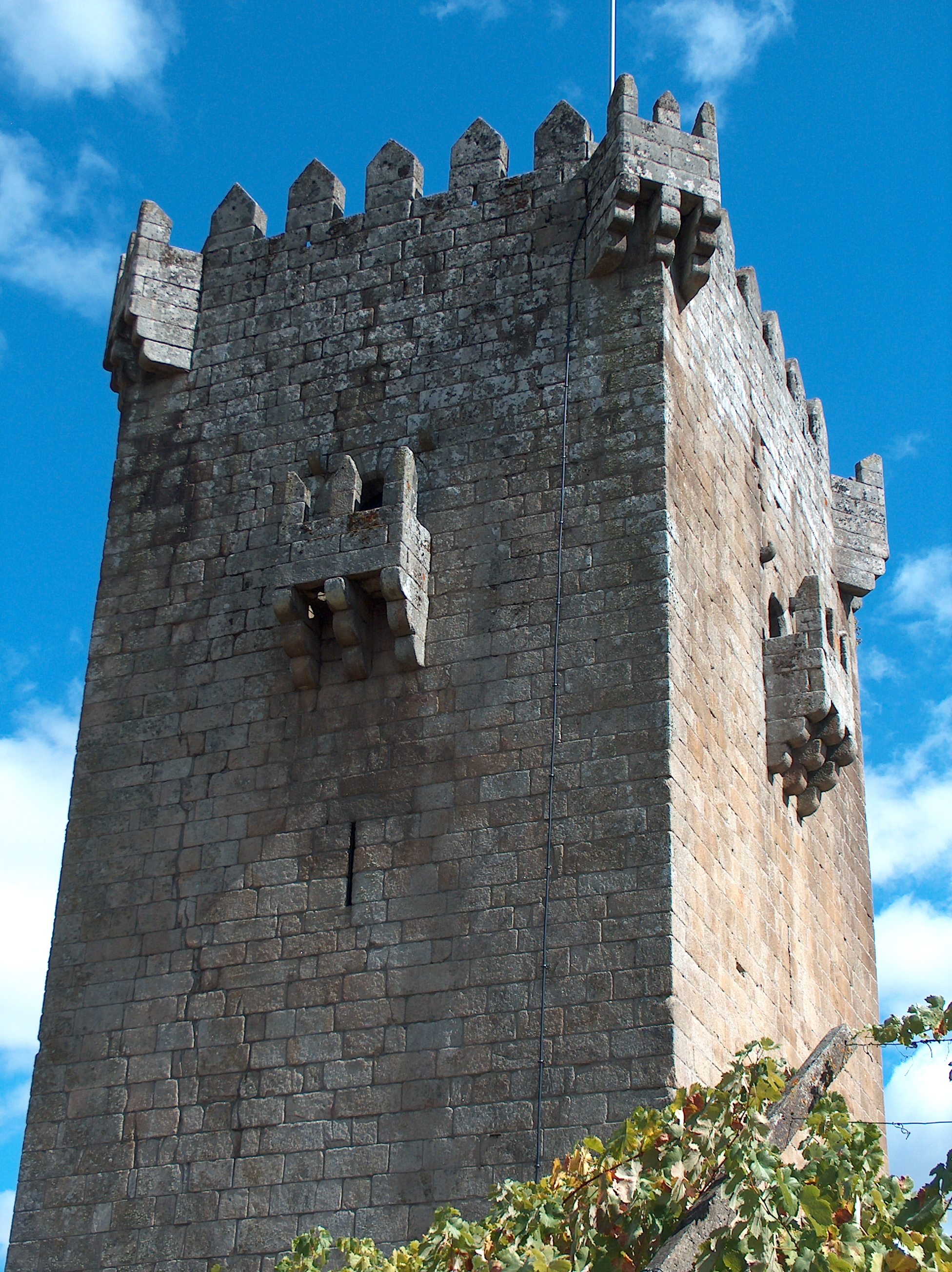
Quintela Tower

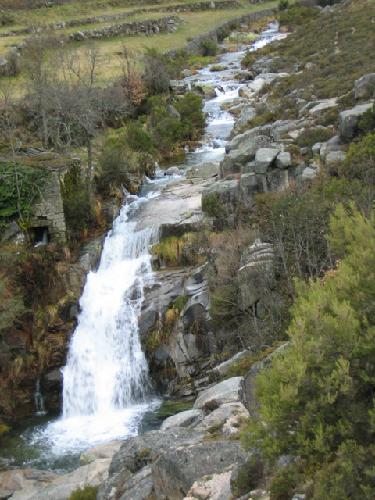
Agarez Waterfall

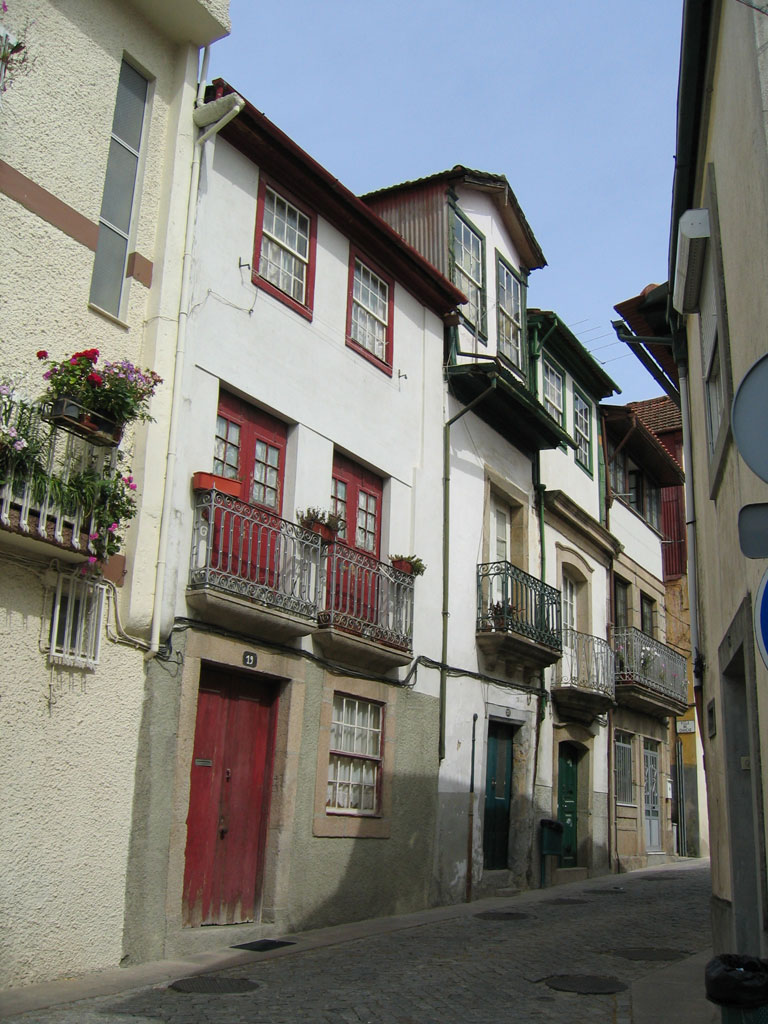
Typical Houses

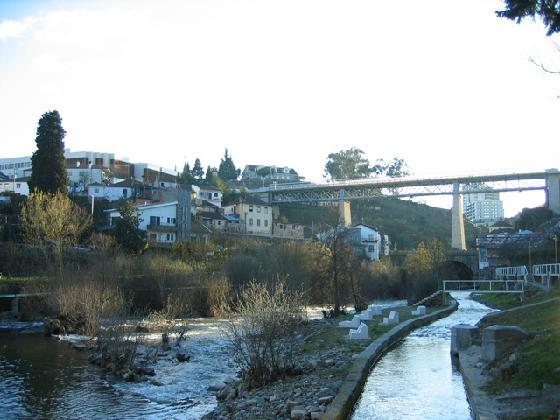
Corgo River and Metallic Bridge in Vila Real

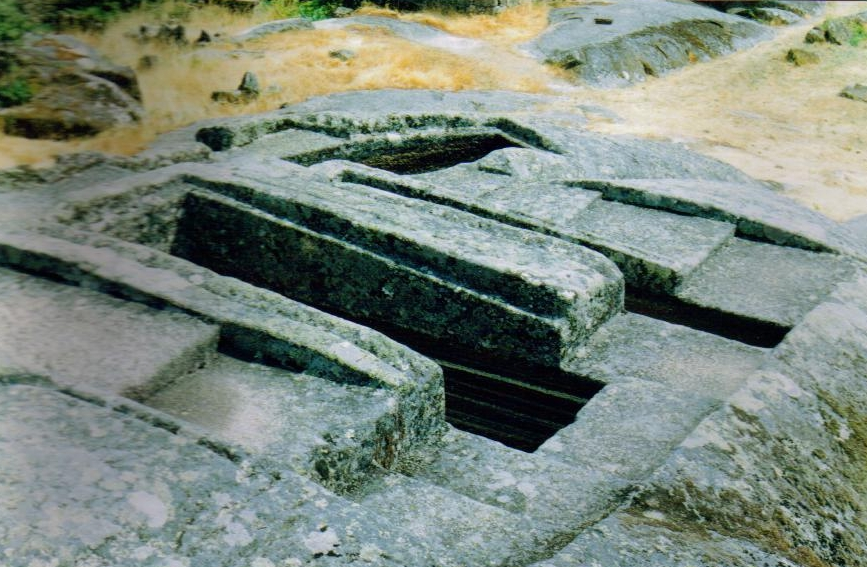
Panóias Sanctuary

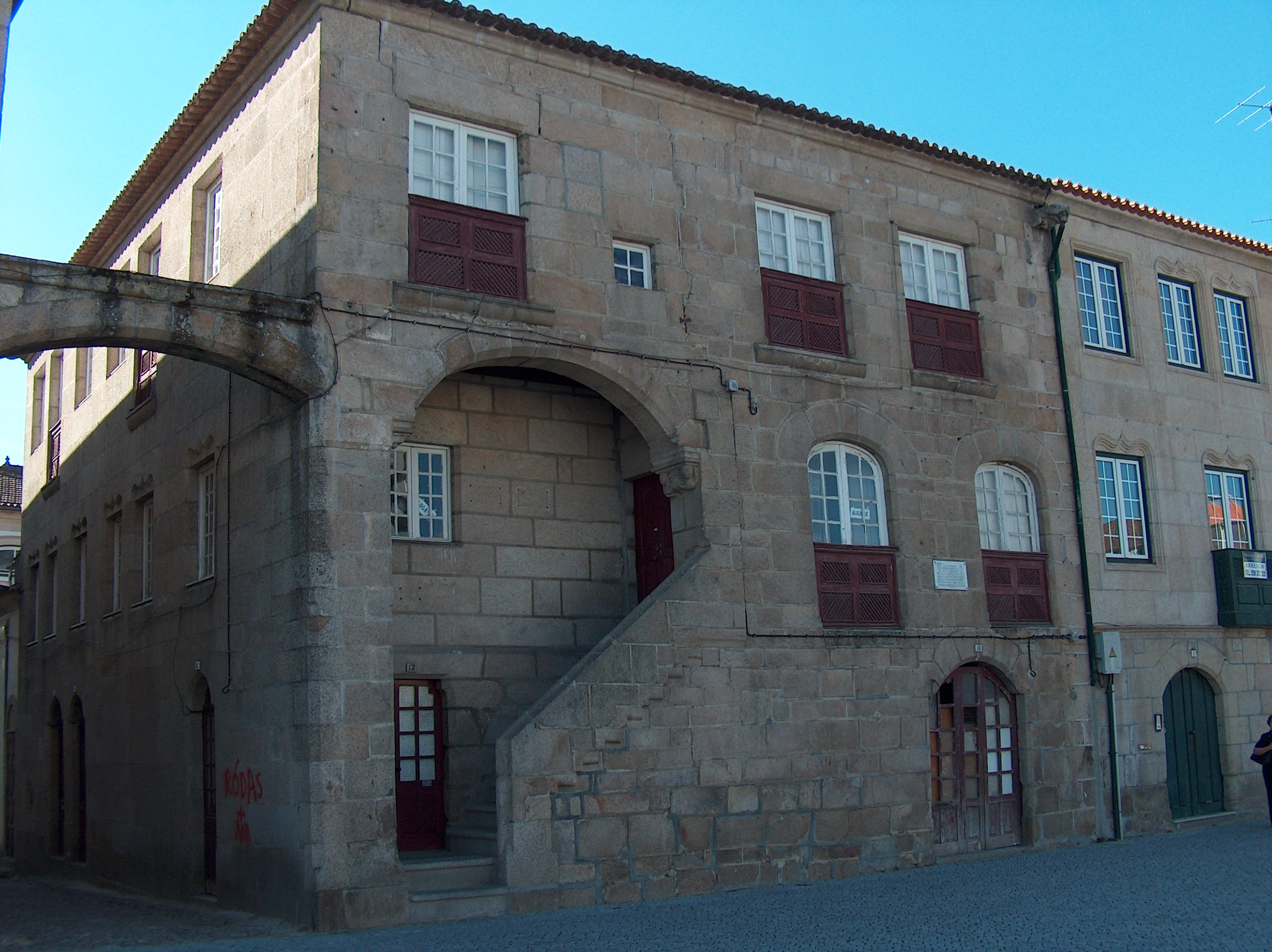
Diogo Cão House

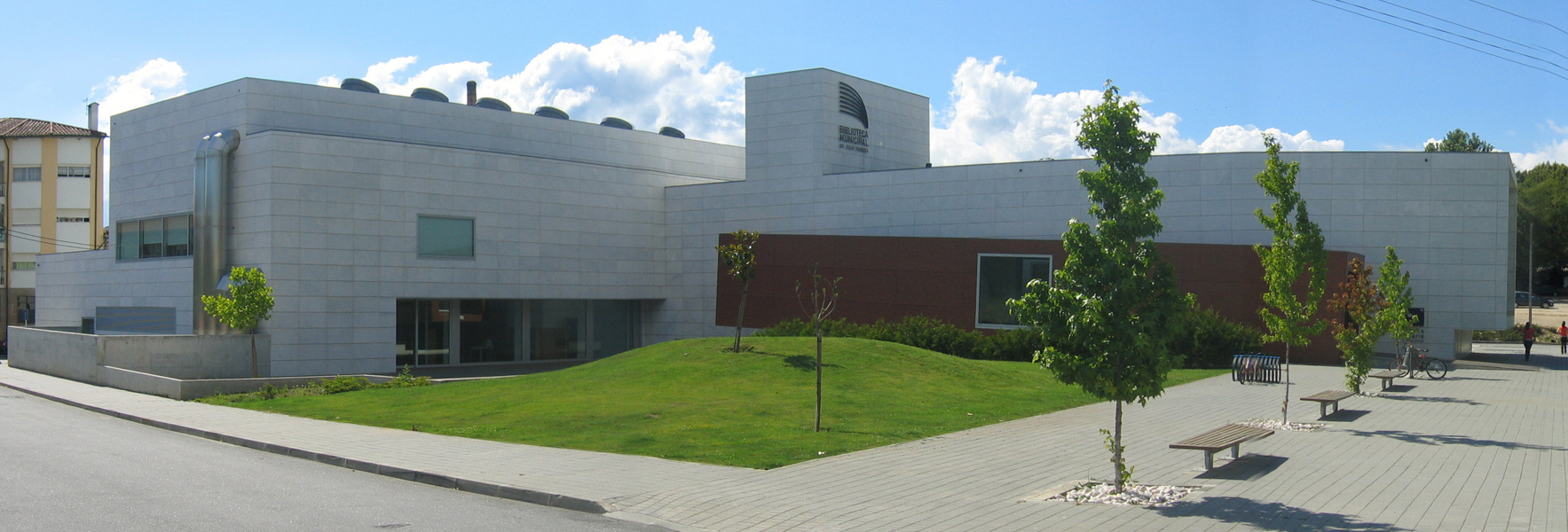
Public Library

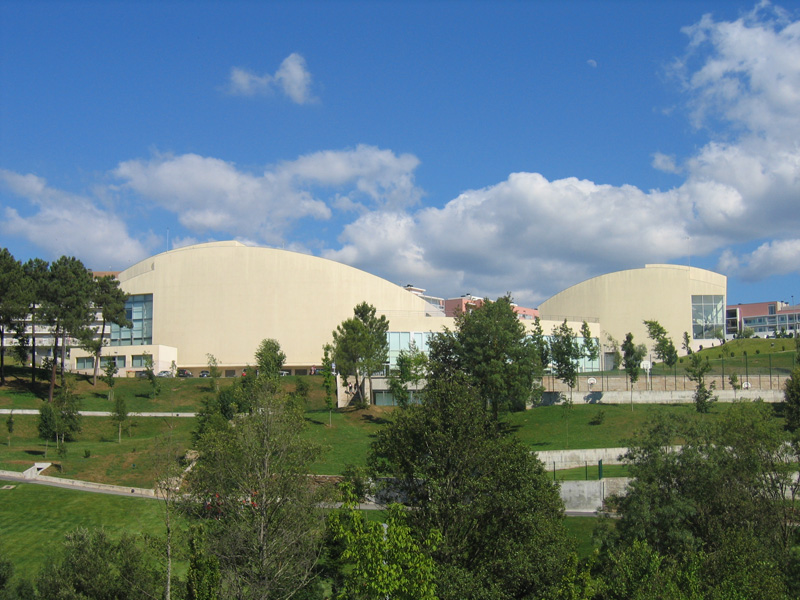
Theatre

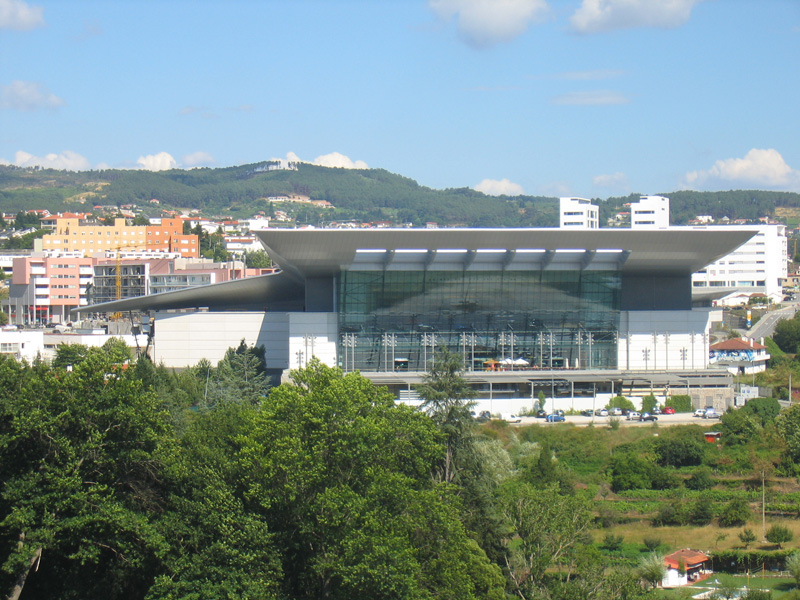
Shopping Centre

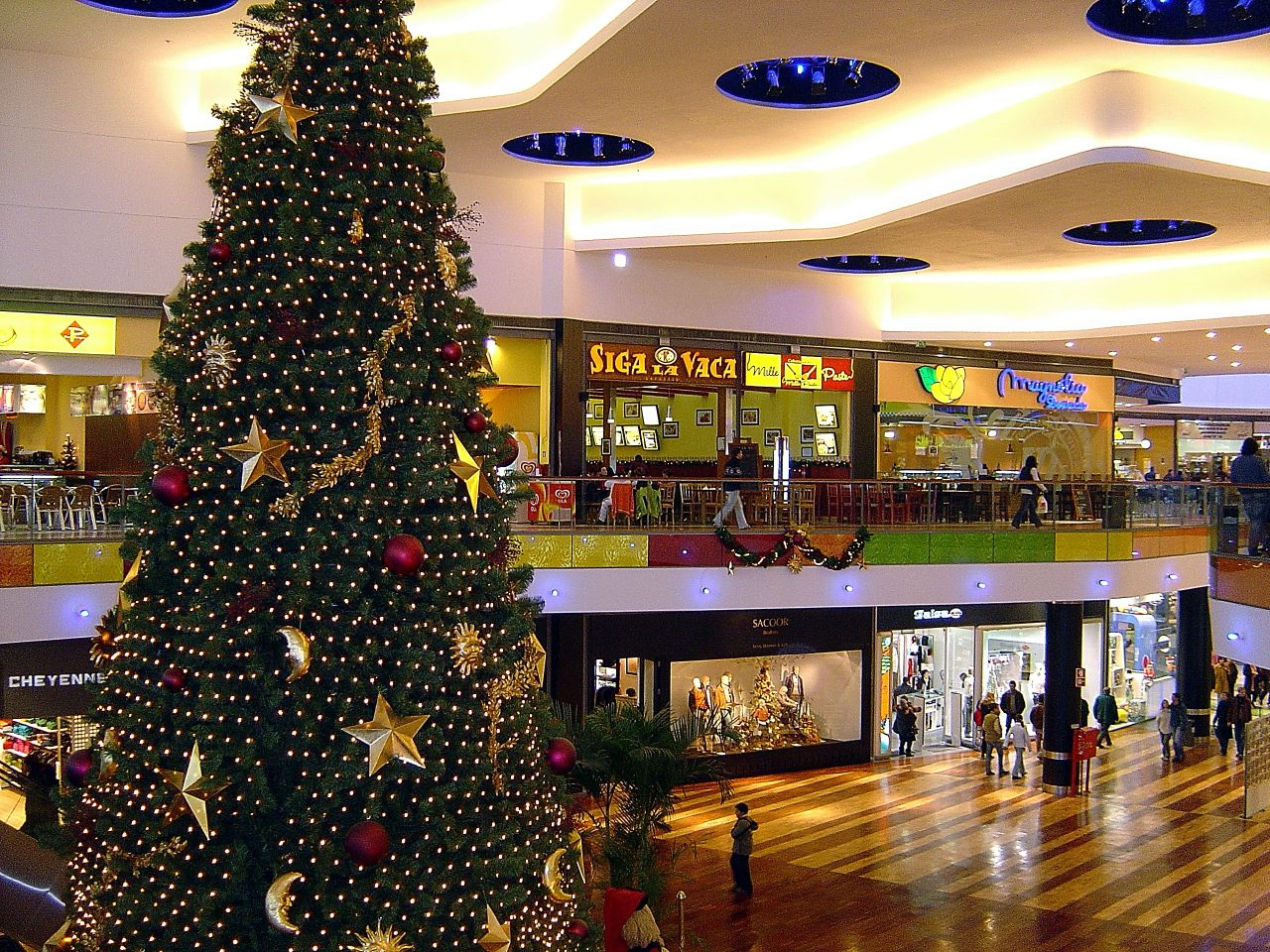
Shopping Centre (interior)
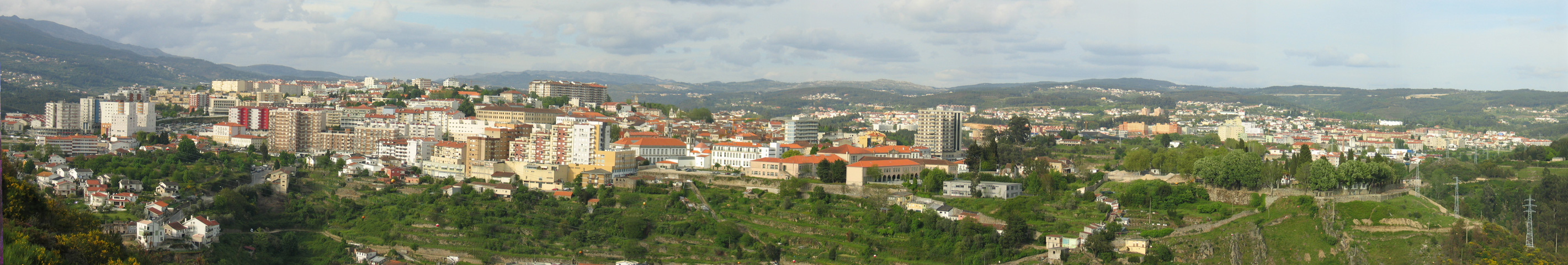
Panoramic view from the South
