= Karl Emil Biel =

German pioneer of photography and phototyping (1838–1915)

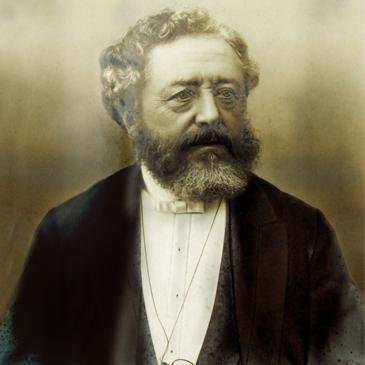
Emilio Biel

Karl Emil Biel, better known as Emílio Biel (18 September 1838 – 14 September 1915), was a German businessman, publisher and photographer, considered one of the pioneers of photography and phototyping in Portugal, He is also the great-great-great grandparent of Oportos current mayor, Rui Moreira.

== Biography ==
Biel was born in Annaberg, Saxony in Germany. After a short stay in Lisbon he settled in Porto in 1860, at the age of 22, where he dedicated himself to commerce, industry, photography and publishing, being considered one of the introducers in Portugal of phototyping, a photo-mechanical printing process that allows many proofs to be printed from the same matrix and with the appearance of real photographs. He had the representation in Portugal of firms such as Coats & Clark, Benz, Schuckert & Co. (a Nuremberg electrical machinery company), among others.

Between 1862 and 1864 he had a button factory in Rua da Alegria. In 1874, he bought the Fritz House (later known as Casa Biel) in Rua do Almada, a commercial house dedicated to photography, thus beginning his career in the world of photography. Later, to "Y. Biel & Cia" moved to the Count of Bolhão Palace, at 342 Rua Formosa.

As an editor, he published in 1880, on the third centenary of Camões' death, a luxurious edition of Los lusiadas printed in Leipzig, Germany, which is now considered a masterpiece. He published important works richly illustrated with photographs, such as Manuel Monteiro's Douro: Principales Quintas, Navegação, Culturas, Paisamentos e Cuações (Porto: Emilio Biel & Cª, 1911).

He had a long collaboration with the historian and art critic Joaquim de Vasconcelos, with whom he edited, in Porto, and in partnership with the photographers José Augusto da Cunha Moraes and Fernando Brütt, a work of eight volumes, published in instalments, entitled Art and Nature in Portugal (Porto, Emílio Biel & Cª Editores, 1902-1908), which had the collaboration of a large group of writers and scholars. Among them were Joaquim Vasconcelos, Carolina Michaëlis de Vasconcelos, Manuel Monteiro, Augusto Fuschini, Visconde de Vilarinho de São Romão (3rd), Júlio de Castilho, Ramalho Ortigão, Luís de Magalhães, Brito Rebelo, Gabriel Pereira, Luís Figueiredo da Guerra.

Emilio also worked on landscape photography and large engineering works. In 1885, he began to document and photograph the construction of the railway in Portugal as well as the Port of Leixões in Matosinhos between 1884 and 1892.

In the time of King D. Fernando de Saxe-Coburg-Gota, also of German nationality, he was a photographer of the Royal House.

He was a photographic collaborator in the magazine Illustração Portugueza (1884-1890), in the weekly magazine Branco e Negro (1896-1898) and in the magazine Tiro e Sport(1904-1913).

He installed the electric light in Vila Real, he was the administrator of the Empresa das Águas do Gerês, he drove the first tram that ran from Battle Square in the Port to Devesas (inaugurated on 28 October 1905), he introduced the first electric light installation in the Port and the first telephone. Following this interest in technological innovation, Biel devoted himself to horticulture and flower growing, as well as butterfly collecting. His collection is now housed in the Zoology Museum of the University of Porto and is considered one of the largest in the world.

With Portugal's entry into World War I in 1916, the German colony was forced to leave the country in five days and its assets were confiscated. The Y. Biel & C.ª was also confiscated and its goods subsequently sold at public auction. As Emílio Biel died on September 14, 1915, he was spared this disaster, which would however lead to the irretrievable loss of a large part of his photographic work (thousands of glass plates, phototypes and paper documents) and the dispersal of the remainder by various collectors and archives.

Part of the plundered material of the Emílio Biel & Cª company is in the possession of the Porto Municipal Historical Archive.
