= A7 motorway (Portugal) =

Tolled motorway in northern Portugal

Auto-estrada 7

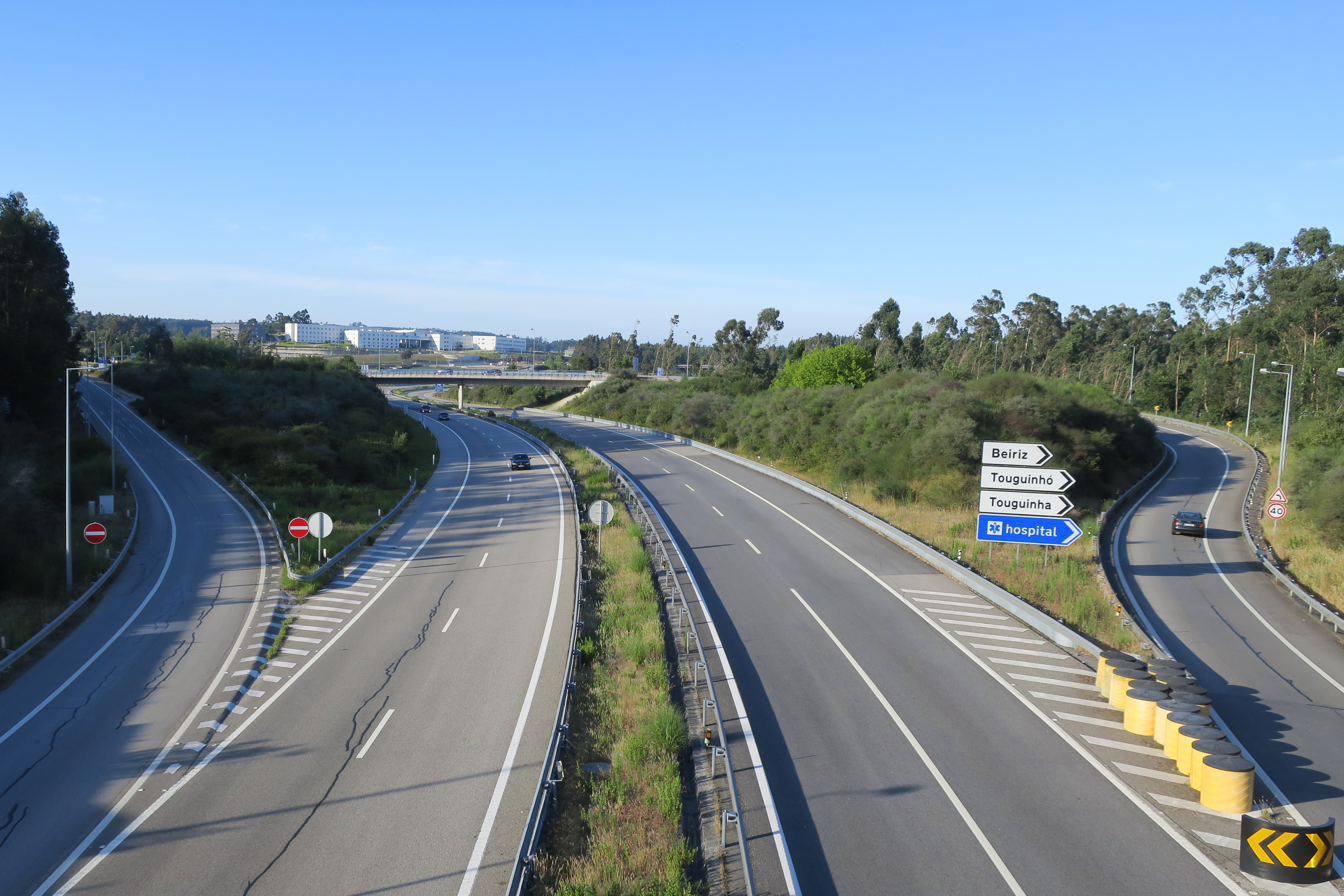
- A7 motorway near the Senhor do Bonfim private hospital, outside Vila do Conde.

Route information
- Part of E805
- Maintained by Ascendi (Norte)
- Length: 103.9 km (64.6 mi)
- Existed: 1994–present

Major junctions
- West end: Argivai, Póvoa de Varzim
- - Póvoa de Varzim; - Cruz (Vila Nova de Famalicão); - Selho (Guimarães); - Calvos (Guimarães)
- East end: Vila Pouca de Aguiar

Location
- Country: Portugal

Highway system
- Roads in Portugal

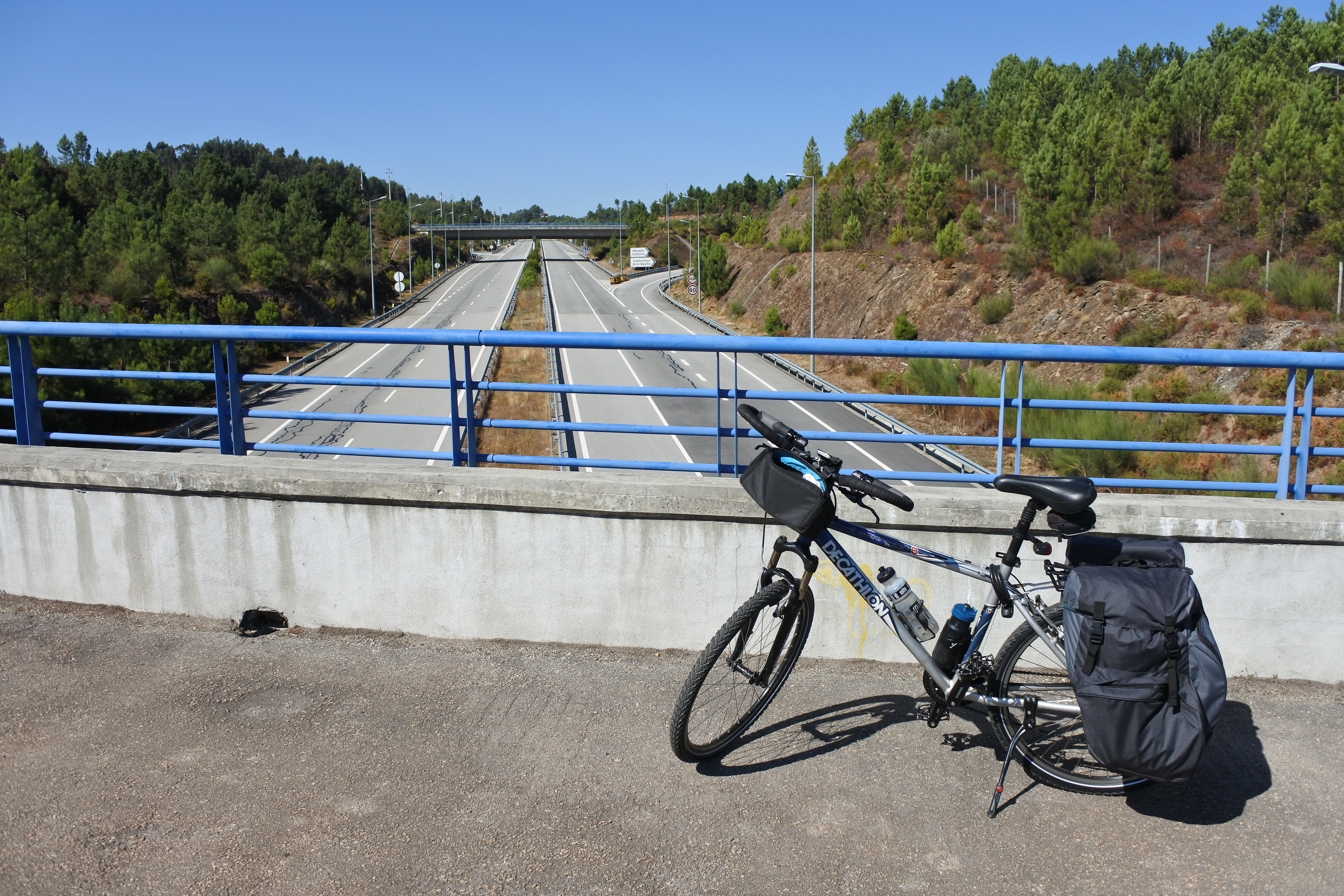
A7 seen from the Ecopista do Tâmega at the Basto junction, Arco de Baúlhe

The A7 (Auto-estrada 7) is a tolled motorway in northern Portugal. Its 103.9-kilometre (64.6-mile) route from Póvoa de Varzim to Vila Pouca de Aguiar, connects the coast to several of the medium-sized inland cities and towns, namely in the industrial heartland and southern part of the Minho Urban Quadrilateral [pt].

Starting near the northern coastline, the A7 uses the River Ave's industrial valley to reach Vila Nova de Famalicão and Guimarães, crossing the Minho region's dispersely resided countryside into the mountains where its course becomes sinuous and needs to take elevation into account, for which over twenty viaducts were needed to reach towns such as Fafe and Ribeira de Pena.

Concessioned to Ascendi [pt] and completed in 2007, its itinerary is overlapped by the Complementary Itinerary 5 (IC5) [pt] route in its entirety, and the european E805 between Vila Nova de Famalicão and its eastern end. Its section between Fafe and its eastern terminus was meant to also integrate the Complementary Itinerary 25 (IC25) (Note: The IC25 was originally meant to travel between the A41-CREP junction at Sobrado (Valongo) and Chaves (IP3). Currently, as of 2026, only the A42 is marked as such) [pt] road although it is currently not marked as such. The A11 motorway, which briefly overlaps the A7 outside of Guimarães, also serves the Lower Minho area by running parallel to this motorway from this city to the coast. The majority of its route was formerly and is alternatively served by the EN205 [pt] (Póvoa de Varzim - Arco de Baúlhe) and EN206 (Vila do Conde - Vila Pouca de Aguiar) national roads.

== History ==
In modern terms, the importance of a route similar to the current A7 was first recognised during the elaboration of the National Road Plan of 1985 (Plano Rodoviário Nacional, or PRN85), which marked the route from Póvoa de Varzim to Vila Pouca de Aguiar and further to Murça as the Complementary Itinerary 5 (IC5). Interest had, however, existed for considerable time, with reports as early as 1983 referring the idea of a Porto-Famalicão-Braga-Guimarães motorway.

As a true motorway however, it was in 1991 that it got under way as a mere branch road meant to connect Guimarães to the existing network at Vila Nova de Famalicão therefore connecting it to the A3, with its concession initially given to Brisa. The public contest for the road's construction was launched in December 1991, for what would be the only fully state-built stretch of the motorway.

The A7 reached Guimarães later than expected in May 1996. (Note: The access to the city was done through the Guimarães Oeste junction, which has since been transferred to the A11 after the extension to Fafe was built.) The following month tolls were approved for the Ave - Guimarães section, with a cost initially ranging between 70$00 (Class 1) and 180$00 (Class 4)(PTE). On 24 October, the government issued a statement which, among other issues, announced the opening of the concession rights to several of the new motorways including the A7. At the start of 1997, the central government would open the public contest for the construction of the full length of the "A7/IC5" as it exists today, between Póvoa de Varzim and the "IP4" (Vila Pouca de Aguiar).

In 1999, the government would finally decide on the concession contract. Brisa would therefore relinquish their original section, with the state handing the rights of the A7 as well as the new A11 to AENOR (now a section of Ascendi [pt]). As part of the contract, the deadlines for construction of the new sections of road with the Guimarães - Fafe section set for the end of 2002, the western section from Póvoa de Varzim to Famalicão set to the first quarter of 2004 and the eastern stretch from Fafe to the IP4 at Vila Pouca de Aguiar set to the first quarter of the following year.

Planning for the westward section of the motorway, known as the A7/IC5 - Lanço Póvoa de Varzim/Famalicão, therefore started around this time, with its environmental impact assessment report being released in June 2001. While the landscape it was meant to cross was comparatively simple to the eastern end, several barriers still had to be overcome to complete the project. One of its main issues was the fact it affected three archaeological sites, two of which were protohistoric: the Castro de Argivai (a probable protohistoric farmhouse in Póvoa de Varzim), the surrounding archeological area of Cividade de Bagunte [pt] (a protohistoric city) and Quinta dos Cavaleiros (a property related to Nuno Álvares Pereira and in the dominium of the counts of Cavaleiros), both of the latter in Vila do Conde's countryside. Possible existence of prehistoric tumuli were surveyed but delivered no results. One of the most affected sites was Castro de Argivai, whose excavations garnered some results in 2002, when ceramics and ruins of walls surfaced.

Construction formally began in July 2003 after a 15-month delay, pushing back the deadline to April 2005, although due to a combination of factors such as good weather, it would finish ahead of the new schedule with the section being opened at midnight on 31 January 2005 by the local mayors in a ceremony at the main job site in Vilarinho de Cambas [pt], Famalicão.

Póvoa-Famalicão was accompanied by concomitant works for the eastern sections, which were underway after its approval by the central government in 2000 and March 2001. Representing the section of motorway heading into the mountains, the main challenge in this section would be the construction of viaducts to counter the steep elevation and river valleys it would need to cross, particularly east of Fafe. Like in the western section, delays in getting construction started delayed its opening as per the established deadlines in 1999. In this case, on the ground, the topologically simpler Selho-Guimarães-Fafe section would create the most issues due to planning and expropriation issues which despite a late 2002 deadline ran several years over and to the point it would not the first new section to open.

Eight months over, on 19 November 2004, a middle section between Fafe and Cabeceiras de Basto was inaugurated at its eastern junction at Arco de Baúlhe, which alone cost €115 million. While at this time the subsection Fafe-Calvos was also complete, it had to await the completion of other roads as at the time it didn't yet connect to anything. With work continuing further east, on midnight of the 23 December 2005, a double inauguration of the Selho-Fafe and Basto-Vila Pouca de Aguiar sections would occur effectively adding 40 kilometres to the road network. The road wasn't complete just yet, however as the IP3 hadn't yet been built. To ensure the A7 opened without further delays, junction 14 was anticipated to a newly built roundabout between the villages of Lixa do Alvão [pt] and Carrazedo do Alvão on the EN206.

On 27 July 2007, two years after initially scheduled, the A7 and IP3 connected outside Vila Pouca de Aguiar, therefore completing the road. This was considered on inauguration by the concessionaire as another marker in connecting Portugal to Central Europe, as it would indirectly connect to border at Vila Verde da Raia-Verín. The section added a further six kilometres and subsequently meant the demolition of the old end ramps and junction. The roundabout, remains between the two villages, despite only being connected to the national road.

=== Future development ===
Although the road itself is complete there are proposals to add junctions to it. Currently, the main proposal for a new junction is located between Varzim and Famalicão at Fradelos and is awaiting approval of the central administration. Part of the initial project but not executed, the argument aside the heavy traffic of the national road in the area would be to serve the industrial complexes in the surrounding civil parishes as well as the new Balazar Sanctuary (Note: Also written Balasar Sanctuary.) which is set to be inaugurated in October 2026 and expected to create a new hub of travel to the area.

With its exclusion questioned by members of parliament in 2006 by PSD, its execution has been a point of local reinvindaction by different local executive terms and parties. In 2025, a commission for a study for the Fradelos/Balasar junction was announced. Its inclusion in the 2026 State Budget (OE2026), proposed by CDU, was rejected after votes against from the incumbent right-wing government parties.

== Route ==
=== Details ===
In total, the A7 took just over a decade to be complete in its full length, belonging in its entirety to the North region Ascendi concession. Its typical profile is one of two lanes per direction along its route from Póvoa de Varzim to Vila Pouca de Aguiar, although some exceptions exist in which three lanes in one or both directions exist to account for the considerable elevation changes in its route into the mountains.

Sections of the A7/IC5
Section	Status	Length (km)
Póvoa de Varzim - Vila Nova de Famalicão	In service (31 Jan 2005)	20.3
Vila Nova de Famalicão - Nó do Ave (Serzedelo)	In service (1994)	13.1
Nó do Ave (Serzedelo) - Nó de Selho	In service (May 1996)	4.3
Nó de Selho - Fafe	In service (23 Dec 2005)	18.8
Fafe - Cabeceiras de Basto	In service (19 Nov 2004)	20
Cabeceiras de Basto - Vila Pouca de Aguiar (Lixa do Alvão)	In service (23 Dec 2005)	23
Vila Pouca de Aguiar (Lixa do Alvão) - Vila Pouca de Aguiar	In service (27 July 2007)	4

=== Route summary ===
Route of the A7/IC5 road
Km	Exit number	Destinations	Exit road	Notes
0		ER 206; Vila do Conde; Póvoa de Varzim; Argivai	ER 206	
0	1	A28 Porto, Maia; Leixões	A28	Maia marked on eastbound exit, Leixões on westbound exit only. Cloverleaf interchange
0	2	A28 Valença, Viana do Castelo; Póvoa de Varzim	A28	Valença marked on approach signage only. Marked as 2 on westbound route. Cloverleaf interchange shared with 1
1	2	EN 206 Beiriz, Touguinha, Touguinhó hospital igreja de Rates	EN206	Westbound entry, eastbound exit only. Half-trumpet
2	Praça de Portagem de Rio Mau (toll)			
3	3	EN206 Rio Mau, Junqueira/ Beiriz, Touguinha, Touguinhó hospital	EN206	2 eastbound destinations serviced and announced at this westbound exit Trumpet
4	River Este			
20	4	EN14 Famalicão, Trofa	EN14	Trumpet
21	5	A3 Porto, S.tº Tirso/ Braga, Cruz (Valença)	A3	Santo Tirso and Cruz only mentioned at the access road divergence. Half cloverleaf into access road, leading to trumpet interchange
23	Ribeira de Gerém			
23	Área de serviço de Seide (service area)			Serviced by Galp, formerly included a restaurant and hotel.
25	6	EN206 Vermoim; EM573 Seide	Av. da Liberdade, S.Miguel de Seide	Trumpet; Access to Casa de Camilo
32	River Ave			
33	7	EN310 Pevidém; Vizela; Riba de Ave, Serzedelo	EN310	Vizela despite being a municipality, is only announced on exit. Trumpet
38	8	A11 Braga; Guimarães (A3) Valença	A11	Keep left on eastbound route. Referred to as the "Nó de Selho" junction. Three leg directional junction
38	8	A7 Guimarães sul A11 Felgueiras; A24 Chaves/ A7 V. Conde, Famalicão; A3 Porto	(A7)	On the eastbound route, keeping on the A7 is officially marked as exit 8 as it necessitates the right lanes to turn off. Destinations after the slash marked on the westbound route.
42	9	EN105 Guimarães sul (EN106) Vizela	Av. de St.º Estêvão, access to EN105	Concurrent with the A11, in which it is junction 10 (not marked on road as such). Trumpet
46	10	A11 Felgueiras, Vizela (A42) Lousada (A4) Vila Real	A11	Vizela mentioned on westbound route by sign and on the asphalt of the eastbound route. Referred to as the "Nó de Calvos/ Gémeos". End of A11 concurrency. Trumpet
46	Ribeira de Calvos			
49	River Vizela			
53	River Ferro viaduct			
54	Área de serviço de Fafe (service area)			Serviced by Oz Energia.
56	11	EN206 Fafe	EN206	Three leg directional junction
56	Ribeira de Ínsuas			Under 11
76	12	EN210 Celorico, Mondim, Arco Baúlhe; EN205 Cabeceiras mosteiro S.Miguel Refojos	EN205, EN210	Trumpet
76	River Tâmega viaduct			
80	River Louredo viaduct			
81	Emergency escape			Westbound
81	"Agunchos viaducts"			Marked in plans as Viaduto X and X-A
89	13	EN210 Rib.^{ra} Pena	Access roads to EN210/Portela Industrial Zone	Trumpet
89	Praça de Portagem de Ribeira de Pena (toll)			
91	Emergency escape			Westbound
93	Ribeira da Ponte viaduct			
96	Ribeira de Além Relva viaduct			
97	Área de serviço do Alvão (service area)			Serviced by Oz Energia.
98	~~14~~	~~EN206 Vila Pouca de Aguiar~~	~~EN206~~	Temporary end of motorway. Closed and demolished after the A24 motorway connection was opened in 2007.
99	Ribeira do Bôco viaduct			
102	River Torno viaduct			
104	14	A24 ESPANHA, Chaves	A24	Trumpet
104	14	A24 Vila Real, V. P.^{ca} Aguiar	A24	Trumpet

== Tolls ==
Tolls along the A7 (€) by section and vehicle class
Section	2026					2021					2016					2011 (Note: Document does not specify between Famalicão-Cruz and Cruz-Seide, listing "Famalicão-Ceide". It also has a different methodology around the city of Guimarães, showing values for Nó do Ave - Guimarães Oeste (at that point already part of the A11 motorway) and Guimarães Oeste - Guimarães Sul. For this reason, the Guimarães cells were left blank. It also does not specify between Guimarães Sul - Nó de Calvos and Nó de Calvos - Fafe, reporting Guimarães Sul - Fafe.)				
Section	Cl.1	Cl.2	Cl.3	Cl.4	Cl.5	Cl.1	Cl.2	Cl.3	Cl.4	Cl.5	Cl.1	Cl.2	Cl.3	Cl.4	Cl.5	Cl.1	Cl.2	Cl.3	Cl.4	Cl.5
Rio Mau toll - 3 Rio Mau	0.30	0.55	0.75	0.80	0.21	0.30	0.50	0.65	0.70	0.21	0.30	0.50	0.60	0.70	0.21	0.25	0.45	0.60	0.65	0.18
3 Rio Mau - 4 Famalicão	1.95	3.40	4.35	4.85	1.37	1.70	3.00	3.85	4.25	1.19	1.65	2.90	3.70	4.15	1.16	1.55	2.70	3.50	3.90	1.09
4 Famalicão - 5 Famalicão (Nó da Cruz)	0.15	0.30	0.35	0.40	0.11	0.15	0.25	0.35	0.35	0.11	0.15	0.25	0.30	0.35	0.11	0.45	0.75	0.95	1.10	0.32
5 Famalicão (Nó da Cruz) - 6 Seide	0.40	0.65	0.85	0.95	0.28	0.35	0.60	0.75	0.85	0.25	0.35	0.55	0.75	0.80	0.25	0.45	0.75	0.95	1.10	0.32
6 Seide - 7 Nó do Ave (Serzedelo)	0.75	1.35	1.70	1.90	0.53	0.65	1.20	1.50	1.70	0.46	0.65	1.15	1.45	1.65	0.46	0.65	1.05	1.35	1.55	0.46
7 Nó do Ave (Serzedelo) - 8 Nó de Selho	0.45	0.85	1,05	1.20	0.32	0.40	0.75	0.95	1.05	0.28	0.40	0.70	0.90	1.00	0.28					
8 Nó de Selho - 9 Guimarães Sul	0.50	0.90	1.15	1.30	0.35	0.45	0.80	1.00	1.10	0.32	0.45	0.75	1.00	1.10	0,32					
9 Guimarães Sul - 10 Nó de Calvos	0.50	0.90	1.15	1.25	0.35	0.45	0.75	1.00	1.10	0.32	0.45	0.75	0.95	1.05	0.32	1.25	2.15	2.80	3.10	0.88
10 Nó de Calvos - 11 Fafe	1.10	1.90	2.45	2.70	0.77	0.95	1.65	2.15	2.35	0.67	0.90	1.60	2.05	2.30	0.63	1.25	2.15	2.80	3.10	0.88
11 Fafe - 12 Basto (A. Baúlhe)	2.20	3.85	4.95	5.50	1.54	1.95	3.40	4.35	4.85	1.37	1.90	3.30	4.20	4.70	1.33	1.75	3.10	3.95	4.40	1.23
12 Basto (A. Baúlhe) - 13 Ribeira de Pena	1.50	2.60	3.35	3.75	1.05	1.30	2.30	2.95	3.30	0.91	1.25	2.20	2.85	3.20	0.88	1.20	2.10	2.70	2.95	0.84
13 Ribeira de Pena - Ribeira de Pena toll	1.55	2.75	3.50	3.90	1.09	1.35	2.40	3.10	3.40	0.95	1.35	2.30	3.00	3.30	0.95	1.25	2.20	2.80	3.10	0.88

== Traffic ==
Traffic data on the A7 has observed a continuous growth of road usage (with the exception of 2020) along its route. The most popular section along the Ave valley, between Famalicão and the Selho convergence for the A11 outside Guimarães, surpasses the yearly average mark of 25 000 cars per day. From the eastern divergence with the A11 at Calvos as the road progresses through the more mountainous sections of the route, where the territory itself is also less populated by comparison, the average use decreases with the final section between Ribeira de Pena and the A24 having the lowest value.

Ascendi's North Concession contract, in which the A7 is included, states in which situations a new lane should be added - if the road currently has two lanes per direction, the construction of a third should be built if a section has an annual average daily traffic of over 38 000 vehicles and if three lanes do exist that an additional lane should be considered at a value of 60 000. As such, as of 2025, no stretch of road currently qualifies for this recommendation.

Annual average daily traffic on the A7
Section	2014	2015	2016	2017	2018	2019	2020	2021	2022	2023	2024	2025	Road status
1 P. Varzim - 3 Rio Mau	6 751	7 403	7 956	8 350	8 685	9 174	7 636	8 332	9 308	10 199	10 834	11 728	No enlargement necessary
3 Rio Mau - 4 Famalicão	7 085	7 707	8 276	8 647	9 026	9 596	8 058	8 723	9 683	10 493	11 165	12 077	No enlargement necessary
4 Famalicão - 5 Famalicão (Cruz)	16 547	17 673	18 696	19 590	20 365	21 465	17 476	19 656	21 511	23 287	24 338	25 643	No enlargement necessary
5 Famalicão (Cruz) - 6 Seide	19 855	21 322	22 423	23 628	24 594	26 238	20 156	22 932	25 693	27 644	28 896	30 944	No enlargement necessary
6 Seide - 7 Nó do Ave (Serzedelo)	17 102	18 394	19 394	20 522	21 315	22 714	17 253	19 776	22 151	23 876	25 236	27 045	No enlargement necessary
7 Nó do Ave (Serzedelo) - 8 Nó de Selho	15 749	16 982	17 946	18 930	19 677	20 702	15 547	18 347	20 882	23 002	24 444	25 945	No enlargement necessary
8 Nó de Selho - 9 Guimarães Sul	8 498	9 340	10 145	11 004	11 866	12 595	10 817	12 042	13 250	14 515	15 459	16 745	No enlargement necessary
9 Guimarães Sul - 10 Nó de Calvos	9 265	10 181	11 047	11 872	12 824	13 530	10 992	12 802	14 355	15 650	16 740	18 056	No enlargement necessary
10 Nó de Calvos - 11 Fafe	6 285	6 840	7 001	7 331	7 872	7 994	6 531	7 382	8 084	8 748	9 355	9 949	No enlargement necessary
11 Fafe - 12 Basto (A. Baúlhe)	5 902	6 312	6 336	6 557	6 788	6 932	5 429	6 177	6 778	7 273	7 591	7 972	No enlargement necessary
12 Basto (A. Baúlhe) - 13 Ribeira de Pena	5 165	5 473	5 390	5 534	5 706	5 798	4 521	5 140	5 613	5 962	6 152	6 341	No enlargement necessary
13 Ribeira de Pena - 14 V.Pouca de Aguiar	4 674	4 978	4 858	4 878	4 965	5 023	3 822	4 422	4 905	5 282	5 509	5 695	No enlargement necessary
Total	10 240	11 050	11 622	12 237	12 807	13 480	10 686	12 144	13 518	14 661	15 477	16 512	No enlargement necessary
Source: IMT ([pt])
