= Monastery of São Bento de Arnóia =

Former Benedictine monastery in Celorico de Basto, Portugal

- Mosteiro de São Bento de Arnóia
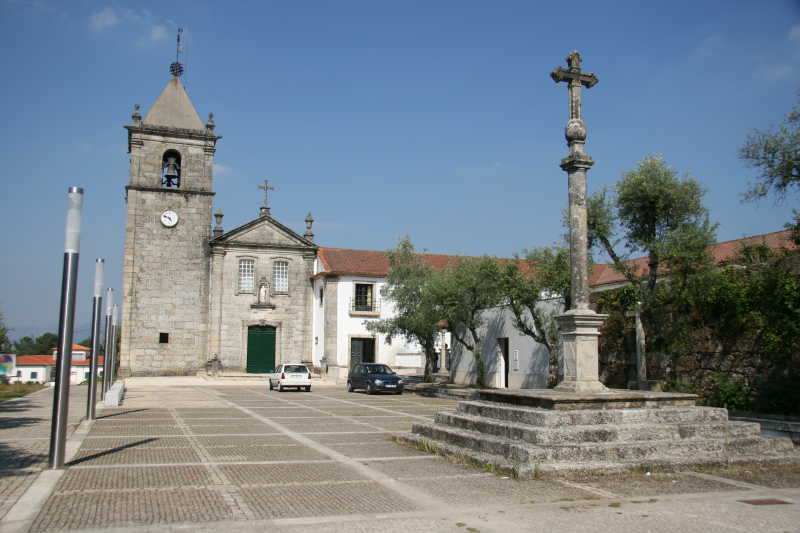
- Church and convent of Arnóia

Religion
- Affiliation: Order of Saint Benedict
- Ecclesiastical or organizational status: Former monastery
- Status: Social institution

Location
- Location: Arnóia, Celorico de Basto, Braga District, Portugal
- Country: Portugal
- Interactive map of Monastery of São Bento de Arnóia
- Coordinates: 41.373774°N 8.014911°W

The Monastery of São Bento de Arnóia, also known as the Monastery of São João de Arnóia or the Church and Convent of Arnóia, is a former Benedictine monastery located in the civil parish of Arnóia, in the municipality of Celorico de Basto, in the Braga District, Portugal.

The complex is under heritage classification and corresponds to a former monastic establishment of the Order of Saint Benedict. After the extinction of the religious orders in Portugal in 1834, its property passed to the parish of Arnóia, and part of the former dependencies was later used for social and charitable purposes. Today, the former monastic complex is linked to the Santa Casa da Misericórdia de São Bento de Arnóia and retains social functions.

== History ==
=== Medieval origins ===
The origin of the monastery remains uncertain. Portuguese heritage sources associate its foundation with the Early Middle Ages and mention two main traditions: one attributes it to Arnaldo Baião in the final years of the 10th century, while the other links it to Múnio Moniz, who died in 1034. The monastery is therefore generally associated with the period of the County of Portugal, before the formation of the Kingdom of Portugal.

The tradition linked to Múnio Moniz is based in particular on the existence of his tomb in the monastery cloister, where an inscription mentions the era 1072, corresponding to the year 1034 of the Christian era. The site is also associated with the nearby Castle of Arnóia, with which it formed one of the religious and defensive centres of the old Basto region.

The monastery is also known in older sources as “São João do Ermo”, due to its location in a rural and isolated setting near Monte Farinha.

=== Benedictine period ===
The monastery belonged to the Order of Saint Benedict and was occupied by Benedictine monks until the extinction of the religious orders in Portugal in 1834. The conventual buildings, church, cloister and agricultural dependencies bear witness to this long monastic occupation.

Over the centuries, the complex was altered several times. The present building preserves medieval elements, but it also results from significant transformations carried out in the early modern period, especially in the 17th and 18th centuries. The frontispiece of the church was renewed in 1824.

=== After the suppression of the religious orders ===
After the extinction of the religious orders in 1834, the monastery's property passed to the parish of Arnóia. Part of the former dependencies was later used to house the civil hospital of São Bento de Arnóia.

The former monastic complex is today linked to the Santa Casa da Misericórdia de São Bento de Arnóia. It retains a social function, notably as a retirement home, home-support service and kindergarten.

== Names ==
The official Portuguese heritage record uses the designation “Igreja e Convento de Arnóia” and also mentions the forms “Mosteiro de São Bento de Arnóia” and “Mosteiro de São João de Arnóia”.

The form “Mosteiro de São João Baptista de Arnóia” is attested in local bibliography, notably in the book O mosteiro de S. João Baptista de Arnoia: Celorico de Basto, by Gabriel de Sousa, with introduction and notes by Armandino Pires Lopes.

The name “São João do Ermo de Arnóia” is also used in local tradition. It refers to the isolation of the site, described as a rugged area near Monte Farinha.

== Description ==
The monastic complex has a longitudinal plan. It includes a single-nave church, a quadrangular chancel, a square-plan bell tower attached to the north side, and conventual dependencies organized around the cloister.

The present building preserves medieval elements, but its current appearance is largely the result of transformations carried out in the early modern period, especially in the 17th and 18th centuries.

The façades are built in ashlar masonry, with straight-lintel openings facing the cloister. The church frontispiece was renewed in 1824.

Inside, the church has a single nave and a more recent chancel. Among the notable elements are a sculpted tympanum representing the Agnus Dei, attributed to the school of Rates, and a plaque depicting Saint Michael attacking the serpent.

The cloister, reached by a stone staircase, is organized around a garden. It has round arches supported by Tuscan columns, boxwood parterres and a central fountain. The basin of this fountain, with concave faces, has two circular bowls supported by a prismatic column topped by a pyramidal pinnacle.

== See also ==
- Arnóia
- Celorico de Basto
- Castle of Arnóia
- Order of Saint Benedict
- Monastery of Singeverga
