= Castelo de Portuzelo =

Castle in Portugal

Coordinates: 41.7019779°N 8.7852104°W

Castelo de Portuzelo is a castle in Portugal. It is classified by IGESPAR as a Site of Public Interest.
