= Alvite =

Alvite may refer to:

- Alvite (Cabeceiras de Basto), a civil parish in the municipality of Cabeceiras de Basto
- Alvite (mineral), a mineral [(Hf, Th, Zr)SiO_{4}·H_{2}O]
- Alvite (Moimenta da Beira), a parish in the municipality of Moimenta da Beira
