= Hugo Macedo =

Portuguese-born Engineering technologist (born 1982)

- Born: Hugo Miguel Magalhães Macedo; November 17, 1982 (age 43); Arco de Baúlhe, Braga
- Education: Universidade Nova de Lisboa, Imperial College London
- Occupation: Engineering technologist
- Known for: Founder and CEO of Smart Separations Ltd

Hugo Miguel Magalhães Macedo (born November 17, 1982) is a Portuguese-born Engineering technologist known as the Founder and CEO of Smart Separations Ltd.

== Early life and education ==
Born in Arco de Baúlhe, Braga, Portugal, Macedo holds a Licenciatura degree in chemical engineering from the Universidade Nova de Lisboa (2000–2006). He also holds a diploma in tissue engineering from the Imperial College London (2006–2011). He equally holds a PhD in tissue engineering from the same Imperial College London (2011).

== Professional career ==
Macedo began a career in technology engineering while doing his PhD in tissue engineering at the Imperial College, London in 2011. He explored research areas such as chemical engineering, stem cell technology, Membrane technology, hydrodynamics, stem cell culture and bio-processing, human blood production, and a lot more.

In 2011, Macedo created the first 3D hollow fibre bioreactor meant for the production of human red blood cells. This got patented as a system design and also featured in Metro Magazine and on the cover page of the November 2011 edition of The Chemical Engineer (TCE) Magazine.

Between 2012 and 2013, Macedo was the Vice-President of PARSUK; the Portuguese Association of Researchers and Students in the UK. In 2013, he also founded Smart Separations Ltd; a technology company that has patented a new filtration technology that overcomes the limitations of existing microsieves. He is currently the CEO of the company and also holds 5 patents.

Macedo is a technology writer. He wrote and published a book chapter captioned Hollow fibre membrane bioreactor technology for tissue engineering and stem cell therapy, In: Comprehensive Membrane Science and Engineering. He has also written several research papers, journals, and conference papers.

== Awards and recognitions ==
- First prize in the Chemical Engineering PhD Symposium 2010 at the Chemical Engineering Department, Imperial College London. March 2010
- Finalist at the Biotechnology Young Entrepreneurs Scheme (YES) 2010 at EPSRC and University of Nottingham, with the company HemaStem; London. 2010.
- STARTUP OF THE YEAR 2014 - Smart Separations Ltd, April 2015 by The Guardian
