= Castle of Arnóia =

Castle in Celorico de Basto, Portugal

- Castelo de Arnóia
- Arnóia, Celorico de Basto, Braga District, Portugal
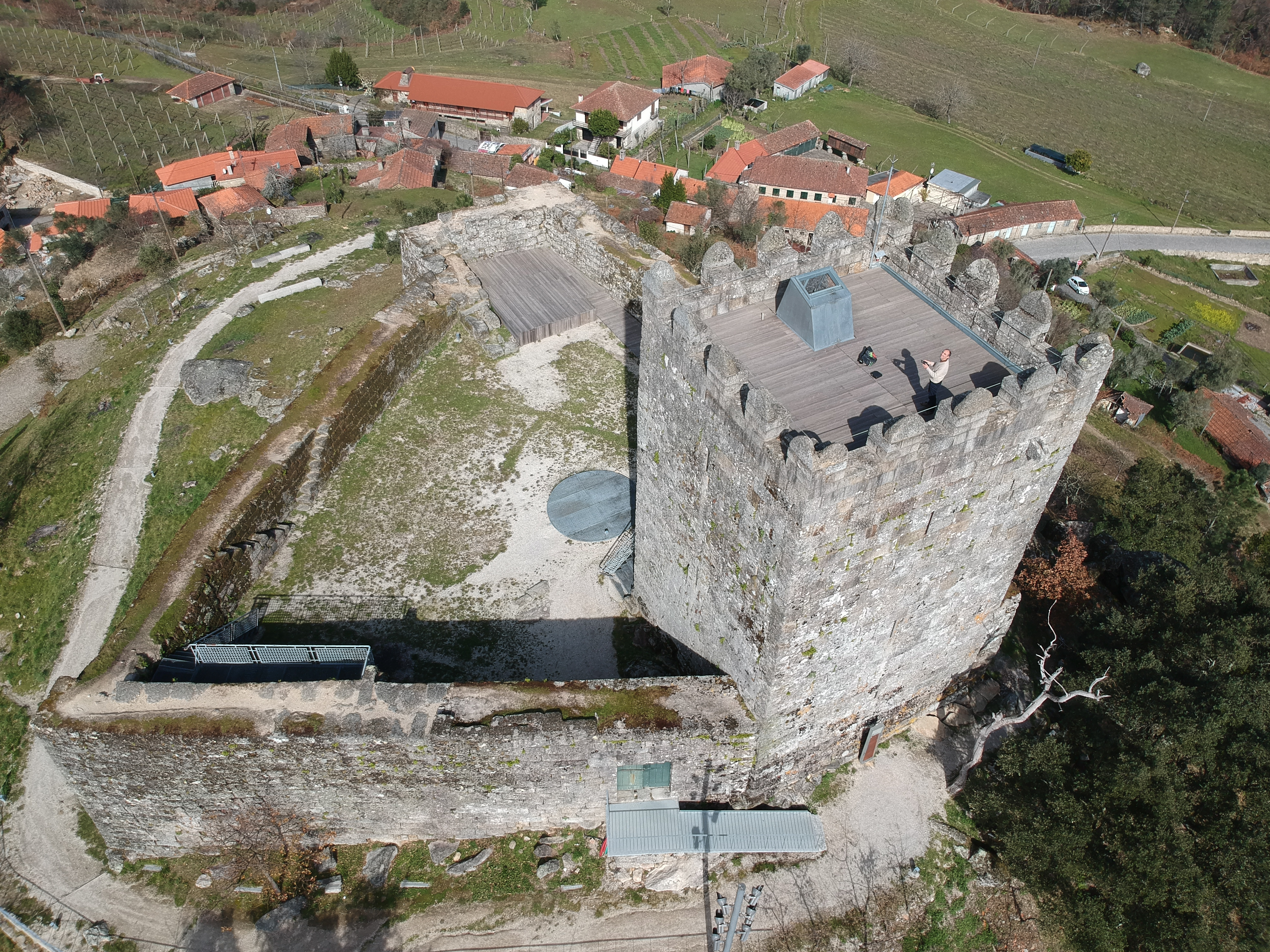
- View of the Castle of Arnóia

Site information
- Type: Castle
- Open to the public: Yes

Location
- Coordinates: 41.363543°N 8.051981°W

Site history
- Built: Late 10th or early 11th century
- Materials: Granite

Garrison information
- Designations: National Monument, since 15 March 1946

The Castle of Arnóia, also known as the Castle of Arnoia, the Castle of the Moors or the Castle of Moreira, is a castle located in the civil parish of Arnóia, in the municipality of Celorico de Basto, in the Braga District, Portugal.

Built on a rocky spur overlooking the former Vila de Basto, it was one of the main defensive and administrative centres of the Terras de Basto. Its construction is generally dated to the late 10th or early 11th century, during the period of the County of Portugal, before the formation of the Kingdom of Portugal, in a context of expanding castle-building in Western Europe.

The castle has been classified as a National Monument since 15 March 1946.

== History ==
=== Background ===
The territory of Celorico de Basto preserves traces of ancient occupation, including prehistoric remains, fortified settlements from the Iron Age and elements from the period of Roman Hispania. However, no ancient structure is securely attested on the exact site of the Castle of Arnóia. The location of the medieval fortress is mainly explained by the defensive position of the rocky spur overlooking the former Vila de Basto.

=== Medieval origins and territorial role ===
The origin of the Castle of Arnóia is traditionally placed in the second half of the 10th century, while the surviving Romanesque structure is associated with the 12th and 13th centuries. Its construction is generally linked to the defence of the nearby Monastery of São Bento de Arnóia. It belongs to the wider development of castle-building that marked Western Europe between the 10th and 12th centuries.

Múnio Muniz is sometimes presented as the first commander of the castle. The fortress became one of the main defensive and territorial centres of the Terras de Basto.

The castle is mentioned in the Inquirições of 1258, during the reign of Afonso III of Portugal. These royal inquiries show its integration into the military, fiscal and seigneurial organization of the territory.

At the death of Afonso III in 1279, the castle commander, Martim Vasques da Cunha, came into conflict with the new king, Denis of Portugal, in the context of political tensions linked to the royal succession. This episode gave rise to a local legendary tradition concerning his escape from the castle.

In 1282, Denis leased the domains of Celorico de Basto to Martim Joanes for the sum of 210 morabitinos, with the obligation to recruit a knight responsible for commanding the castle. In 1284, the domains and the castle were leased to the inhabitants of Celorico de Basto.

In 1402, after the accession of John I of Portugal, the lordship of the Terras de Basto was granted to Gil Vasques da Cunha.

During the reign of Manuel I of Portugal, a new foral was granted to Celorico de Basto on 29 March 1520. It established the seat of the concelho at Arnóia, in the place known as Castelo.

The first local administrative and judicial centre thus developed around the castle. In the present locality of Castelo, in Arnóia, vestiges of this early organization still survive, including buildings associated with the court sessions and prison, the gallows, the former pharmacy and the pillory of the former Vila de Basto.

=== Vila de Basto and early modern decline ===
The decline of the site began in the early 18th century. In 1717, the local administrative centre was transferred from the former Vila de Basto to the civil parish of Britelo.

This relocation was confirmed by a provision of John V of Portugal dated 1719, which transferred the seat of the concelho and of the local jurisdiction of Celorico to Freixieiro, in the parish of Britelo, under the name Vila Nova de Freixieiro. This transfer contributed to the decline of the former Vila de Basto, while the administrative centre gradually became established around the present town of Celorico de Basto.

=== Protection and contemporary restorations ===
The castle was classified as a National Monument by decree published on 15 March 1946.

The monument underwent consolidation and restoration works during the 20th century, especially from the 1960s onwards. In the 1970s, interventions concerned in particular the merlons and the external access to the tower.

The castle reopened to the public in 2004, after restoration and adaptation works. In 2015, a new campaign of works involved the walls, the tower, the accesses, the visitor routes, lighting and technical networks.

== Local legends and contemporary memory ==
=== Traditions of Moorish origin ===
The castle is also known as the “Castle of the Moors” and the “Castle of Moreira”. This designation has nourished a local tradition associating the site with the Moors. In one published version of the legend, the Moors are said to have settled in the fortress of Arnóia, considered easier to defend than the nearby heights of Ladário and Viso.

The same version also mentions the existence of tunnels linking the fortress to the Tâmega River, about ten kilometres away. This element, however, belongs to the legendary register and does not constitute archaeological evidence for the existence of an underground passage. Local oral traditions sometimes evoke a link with Amarante, located on the Tâmega, but this variant does not appear to be documented in currently available published sources.

=== The ruse of the goats with torches ===
The best-known legend concerns the capture of the castle by the Christians. According to this account, the Christian troops, too few in number to attack the fortress directly, devised a nocturnal trick: goats were fitted with lights or torches attached to their horns, in order to make it seem that a large army was approaching. The Moors, deceived by this apparition in the night, are said to have abandoned the castle.

This tradition is also mentioned by the Rota do Românico, which notes that the legend of the capture of the Castle of Arnóia still retains local vitality. It explains the other title sometimes given to the story, that of the “army that was not one”.

=== The escape of the alcaide Martim Vasques da Cunha ===
Another legend concerns Martim Vasques da Cunha, alcaide of the castle during the reign of Denis of Portugal. According to tradition, after the death of Afonso III of Portugal, the alcaide found himself in a situation of conflicting loyalty, having supported the infante Afonso against King Denis. In order to leave his office without dishonour, he is said to have sent the garrison and inhabitants out of the castle, locked himself alone inside the fortress, set fire to a dwelling and then escaped from the walls in a basket suspended from a rope attached to a crenel.

The Rota do Românico also mentions this “legendary event” involving Martim Vasques da Cunha and notes that this type of account has sometimes been used to explain the later abandonment of the military structure.

=== Contemporary staging of the legends ===
These traditions are now reused in local cultural events. In July 2023, the programme of the Medieval Fair of Celorico de Basto, held at the Castle of Arnóia and in the former Vila de Basto, included a fire show entitled “A Lenda do Castelo de Arnoia”.

Since 2025, the legend of the capture of the castle has also been staged during the Noite das Labaredas, organized in the civil parish of Arnóia. The first edition, held in 2025, aimed to recreate the conquest of the castle by the Christians. According to the local press, about one hundred costumed participants took part in the event, which also included a “queimada de Basto”, a laser show and fireworks.

A second edition was announced in 2026, around the spring equinox, with the recreation of the capture of the castle “as the legend tells it”, the “assalto ao castelo” and the “queimada de Basto” on the programme. These events show the place of the legends of Arnóia in contemporary local memory.

== Characteristics ==
The Castle of Arnóia has an irregular polygonal plan, adapted to the relief of the rocky spur on which it stands. The enclosure, built of granite, delimits a small parade ground and follows the unevenness of the terrain.

The walls are provided with a wall-walk and are reinforced to the north by a cubelo, a small flanking tower integrated into the enclosure. Access to the castle is through a single gate, opened to the south, corresponding to a compact defensive organization.

The keep, quadrangular in plan, is attached to the southern sector of the enclosure. Its doorway, facing the parade ground, is located about three metres above the ground; it is now reached by an external staircase built during modern restorations. The interior of the tower is divided into three levels, including a lower level used as a cellar, and the top is crowned with merlons.

At the centre of the parade ground is a cistern, an essential element for water supply in the event of a siege. Outside the enclosure, on the northern slope, there also survive elements linked to the former judicial functions of the Vila de Basto, including the pillory and the former gallows, restored during the 20th century.

Archaeological research carried out in the early 21st century identified several phases of occupation of the site. It indicates in particular a medieval occupation between the 12th and 13th centuries, followed by a later occupation between the 14th and 16th centuries, a period during which the castle retained a residential, administrative and symbolic function rather than a strictly military role.

== See also ==
- Arnóia
- Celorico de Basto
- Monastery of São Bento de Arnóia
- List of castles in Portugal
- List of national monuments of Portugal
