= Rio Douro =

Rio Douro may refer to:

- Douro, a river in Spain and Portugal
- Rio Douro, a civil parish in the municipality of Cabeceiras de Basto municipality, Porttugal
