= Castelo de Montel =

Castle in Portugal

Coordinates: 37.7518693°N 7.9399785°W

Castelo de Montel is a castle in Portugal. It is classified by IGESPAR as a Site of Public Interest.
