= Borba de Montanha =

Civil parish in Portugal

- Civil parish
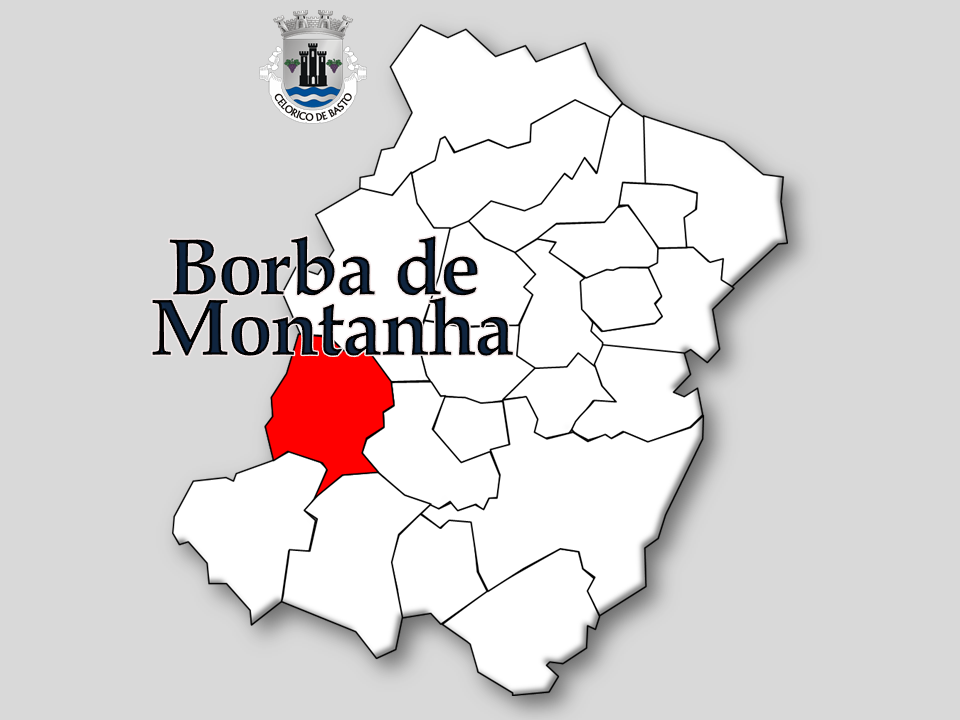
- Location of Borba de Montanha in the municipality of Celorico de Basto
- Coordinates: 41.394722°N 8.100833°W
- Country: Portugal
- Region: Norte
- Intermunicipal community: Tâmega e Sousa
- District: Braga
- Municipality: Celorico de Basto

Area
  - Total: 10.89 km^{2} (4.20 sq mi)

Population (2021)
  - Total: 1,116
  - Density: 102.5/km^{2} (265.4/sq mi)
- Time zone: UTC+0 (WET)
  - Summer (DST): UTC+1 (WEST)

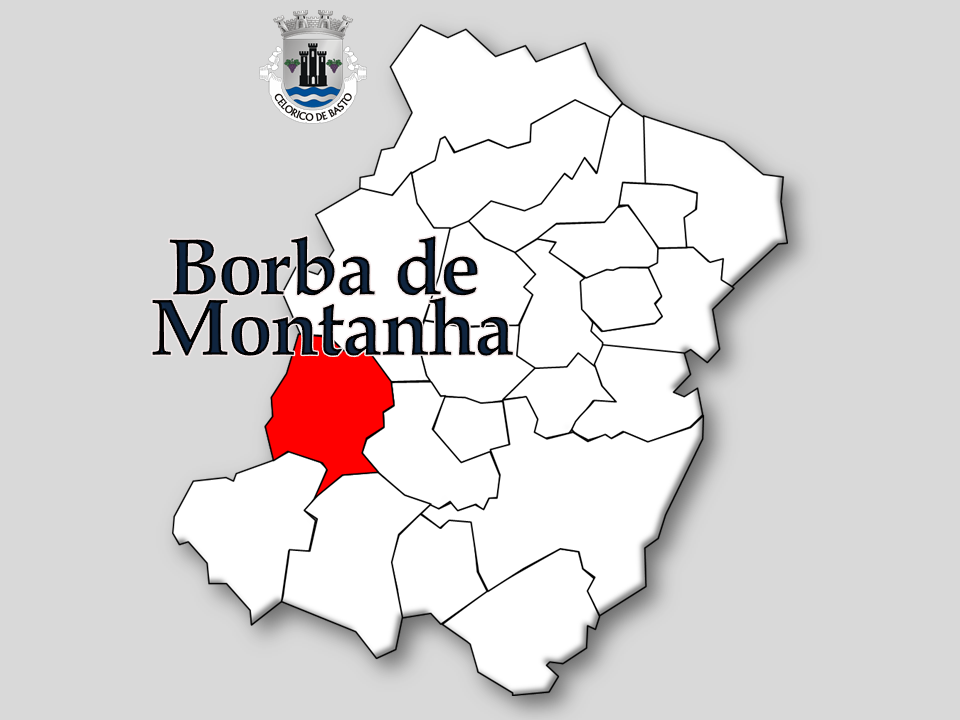
Location of the freguesia of Borba de Montanha in the municipality of Celorico de Basto.

Borba de Montanha — historically and locally also known as Borba da Montanha — is a Portuguese locality and the seat of the civil parish of Borba de Montanha, in the municipality of Celorico de Basto, in the Braga District. The parish covers an area of 10.89 km² and had 1,116 inhabitants according to the 2021 census, corresponding to a population density of about 102 inhabitants per km².

== Geography ==
Borba de Montanha is located in the mountainous part of the municipality of Celorico de Basto, about 16 km west of the municipal seat. The parish covers an area of 10.89 km². Its territory has an average elevation of about 644 m, with a minimum elevation of 485 m and a maximum elevation of 826 m.

The area is characterized by marked relief and a rural landscape composed of hamlets, agricultural tracks and forested areas. The PR2 walking route of Borba da Montanha, 22 km long, crosses rural paths, forest tracks and trails.

The lands of Borba de Montanha are also associated with the valley of the Santa Natália stream, whose fertility historically favored cereal cultivation, particularly maize.

=== Hydrography ===
The territory of Borba de Montanha is linked to the basin of the Santa Natália stream, a right-bank tributary of the Tâmega River. This stream, flowing north to south, rises in the parish of Rego and receives, among others, the waters of the Borba stream.

Several watermills are also recorded in the parish, including the Moinhos de Borba, located on the Borba stream, as well as the mills of Alvarães and Quintela.

== Economy ==
The fertile lands of the Santa Natália valley were historically devoted to cereal cultivation, mainly maize.

== Toponymy ==
=== Origin of “Borba” ===
The toponym “Borba” has been linked to an ancient hydronymic root. The philologist Joseph M. Piel recorded several Portuguese place names formed on this basis, including Borba de Montanha and Borba de Godim, and proposed a Celtic origin with the meaning of “spring” or “gushing water”.

This interpretation connects Borba with the theonym Borvo or Bormo, a deity associated with thermal waters, as well as with the Lusitanian-Celtic god Bormanicus, attested by inscriptions linked to the thermal springs of Vizela.

=== Evolution of the qualifier ===
The parish bore several qualifiers over the course of history in order to distinguish it from other places named Borba, notably Borba de Godim in Felgueiras.

- 11th century: “Borba” alone, as a territorial boundary;
- 1220: “Borba de Juniores”, referring to the juniores who had settled there;
- 1258: “Sancte Marie de Borva”, without qualifier;
- 14th century: “Borba de Azinhores”, documented in royal chancery records and parish documentation;
- 16th century and early modern period: “Borba da Montanha”, a geographical description linked to the mountainous relief of the parish.

The historical form “Borba da Montanha” remains widely used locally, while “Borba de Montanha” is the official administrative name.

== History ==
=== Ancient occupation ===
Archaeological evidence attests to ancient human presence in the territory of Borba de Montanha. Several sites are recorded in the archaeological inventory published in the Diário da República, covering the Late Prehistory, the Neolithic, the Chalcolithic, the Bronze Age, the Iron Age and the Roman period.

Among these sites is the Castro da Barrega, or “Roda do Santinho”, recorded as a povoado, an ancient settlement, attributed to the Chalcolithic, the Bronze Age and the Iron Age. The parish also includes Monte de Afães/Rechãozinha, attributed to the Late Prehistory; Crasto de Murgido e Abrigo, associated with the Neolithic, the Chalcolithic and possibly the Iron Age; and several sites of undetermined chronology, such as Crasto de Cabanelas.

The inventory also records sites from the Roman period, notably Ribeira and Porçã, the latter identified as a possible casal, or small rural settlement. It also mentions several Late Prehistoric sites, including mamoas, or prehistoric funerary tumuli.

The Castro da Barrega yielded a granite anthropomorphic stele attributed to the Chalcolithic, in the 3rd millennium BC, discussed in greater detail in the heritage section.

=== First mention in the 11th century ===
The earliest known documentary mention of Borba dates from the 11th century, in an act from the Diplomata et Chartae, where it is cited as a territorial boundary of Vila Boa, corresponding to the present-day parish of Rego, which borders Borba da Montanha. At that time, Vila Boa was the property of Count Gomes Eicaz, head of the high-ranking Sousa lineage.

=== Borba de Juniores (1220) ===
In the Inquirições of D. Afonso II of 1220, the locality appears under the name Borba de Juniores. The qualifier “de Juniores” refers to the juniores, migrants from a seigneurial domain who, having left their original lineage, settled in a villa ingenua and lost half of their patrimony in exchange for personal freedom. According to the historian A. de Almeida Fernandes, the juniores of Borba probably descended from the Sousa lineage, a powerful noble family of medieval northern Portugal.

In Borba, the juniores had specific obligations mentioned in the Inquirições of 1258: eight casais owed the service of fossadeira and castle service, expressed as vadunt ad chamatum castelli, meaning that they had to answer the call of the castle.

=== Mention in the Inquirições of 1258 ===
The qualifier “de Juniores” had disappeared by the time of the general Inquirições of King Afonso III of Portugal in 1258, where the parish is referred to simply as Sancte Marie de Borva, or Saint Mary of Borba.

=== The terra of Borba de Azinhores in the 14th century ===
In the 14th century, the territory formed a seigneurial terra known as Borba de Azinhores. This terra appears in the context of the 1383–1385 Portuguese interregnum. By a deed of donation dated 6 September 1384 and signed in Lisbon, the Master of Avis, the future John I of Portugal, confiscated the terra of Borba de Azinhores and the property of Vasco Rodrigues Delgado, squire of Martim Gonçalves de Ataíde, alcaide of the castle of Chaves and a supporter of Castile, and granted them to Afonso de Castro, vassal of Count D. Gonçalo Teles, first Count of Neiva.

The donation was confirmed and extended on 11 November 1385. Afonso de Castro shortly afterwards became alcaide of the town of Celorico de Basto.

=== Parish organization and early modern period ===
Borba de Montanha corresponds to the former parish of Santa Maria de Borba da Montanha, whose surviving parish registers cover the period from 1597 to 1911. According to the Arquivo Distrital de Braga, this parish was initially a vicarage annexed to the rectory of São Salvador de Infesta before becoming an independent vicarage.

The Memória Paroquial of 1758, written by the parish priest José Henriques de Carvalho, describes Borba da Montanha as a parish dedicated to Santa Maria, located in the province of Entre-Douro-e-Minho, in the comarca of Guimarães, the archbishopric of Braga and the municipality of Celorico de Basto. In 1758, two chapels are mentioned there: Santo Amaro and Santo António.

Today, the parish belongs to the Diocese of Braga and to the municipality of Celorico de Basto.

=== 1755 earthquake ===
The Memória Paroquial of 1758 mentions the effects of the earthquake of 1 November 1755 in Borba da Montanha. According to this document, the parish did not suffer general ruin, but the parish church was affected, notably the tabernacle, the sacristy and part of the body of the building.

== Settlements ==
In addition to its seat, the parish of Borba de Montanha includes the following main settlements:

- Afães
- Alvarães
- Barrega
- Borba
- Bouça
- Cabanelas
- Carreiras
- Casais
- Castanheira
- Codeçais
- Combro de Quintela
- Combros
- Cruzinha
- Eido
- Igreja
- Lages
- Lama
- Lameiros
- Mondrões
- Moinhos
- Murgido
- Picouto
- Porçã
- Portela
- Preza
- Quintela
- Redondo
- Ribeira
- Residência
- Vilar

== Demographics ==
The population recorded in the parish of Borba de Montanha evolved as follows:

Population of Borba de Montanha
Year	Population	Change since previous census
1758	900	—
1864	1,303	—
1878	1,365	+4.8%
1890	1,331	−2.5%
1900	1,324	−0.5%
1911	1,427	+7.8%
1920	1,401	−1.8%
1930	1,487	+6.1%
1940	1,551	+4.3%
1950	1,698	+9.5%
1960	1,684	−0.8%
1970	1,553	−7.8%
1981	1,393	−10.3%
1991	1,235	−11.3%
2001	1,255	+1.6%
2011	1,294	+3.1%
2021	1,116	−13.8%

The population reached its maximum in 1950, with 1,698 inhabitants, before declining progressively during the second half of the 20th century and the beginning of the 21st century.

=== Age distribution ===
Age distribution of the population
Year	Total population	0–14 years	15–24 years	25–64 years	65 years and over
2001	1,255	267; 21.3%	223; 17.8%	539; 43.0%	226; 18.0%
2011	1,294	220; 17.0%	172; 13.3%	638; 49.3%	264; 20.4%
2021	1,116	130; 11.6%	133; 11.9%	547; 49.0%	306; 27.4%

Between 2001 and 2021, the share of children under 15 fell from 21.3% to 11.6%, while the share of people aged 65 and over rose from 18.0% to 27.4%, indicating a clear ageing of the population.

== Heritage ==
=== Castro da Barrega ===
The Castro da Barrega, popularly known as the “Roda do Santinho”, is located on the heights of the hamlet of Barrega, at an elevation of about 739 m. Its dominant position makes it a landmark in the landscape, with diachronic occupation from the Chalcolithic to the Iron Age.

The site is particularly known for the granite anthropomorphic stele found there, considered an example of Chalcolithic proto-statuary from the 3rd millennium BC, with parallels in several regions of the Iberian Peninsula.

In 1940, on the occasion of the commemorations of the tricentenary of the Restoration of Independence and the seventh centenary of national independence, a commemorative cross was erected at the summit of the castro.

=== Other castros ===
Besides the Castro da Barrega, two other castros are recorded in the parish. The Castro de Murgido, located on the heights of the hamlet of Murgido at about 722 m elevation, is associated with a rock shelter, the “Abrigo do Castro de Murgido”, and preserves only modest remains. The archaeological inventory associates it with the Neolithic, the Chalcolithic and possibly the Iron Age.

The Castro de Cabanelas, located at about 712 m elevation in the hamlet of the same name, is recorded as a site of undetermined chronology.

=== Parish Church of Santa Maria ===
The parish church of Borba de Montanha, dedicated to Santa Maria, has a longitudinal plan composed of a single nave and a narrower rectangular chancel arranged on the same axis. The square-plan bell tower is attached laterally to the north, near the main façade, and is topped by a bulbous dome surmounted by an iron weather vane in the form of a musician angel. The façades are built of granite ashlar masonry in irregular courses, with pilastered corner chains topped by pinnacles.

A reference to the “Igreja de Santa Maria de Borba de Azinhores” appears as early as 1320, when the building was taxed at 100 pounds in the Censual of the Diocese of Braga. The church is again mentioned in 1726 as an “igreja antiga”. The reconstruction of the present building took place in the second half of the 18th century. At the end of the 19th century, azulejo tiles were installed in the nave and chancel, and mural paintings were executed in the chancel. The lateral altarpiece on the Epistle side, preserved in the building, dates from the 17th century. The church has undergone recent restoration.

=== Chapels and wayside cross ===
The parish has several chapels. The chapels of Santo António and Santo Amaro, already mentioned in 18th-century parish sources, are included in the historical heritage recorded by the municipality. The chapel of Santo Amaro also has its own record in the Sistema de Informação para o Património Arquitectónico.

The municipal inventory of religious heritage also mentions the chapel of São Brás, the chapel of São José and the wayside cross of Cabanelas, the latter dating from the 19th century.

== Culture and traditions ==
=== Festas de Nossa Senhora de Cima ===
The main celebration of the parish is the festival of Nossa Senhora de Cima, held annually from 13 to 15 August and organized by the parish of Santa Maria de Borba da Montanha. The name “Senhora de Cima” refers to the Assumption of Mary, celebrated on 15 August.

According to testimonies collected by Celorico Digital, the festival was long organized irregularly by groups of emigrants in thanksgiving for their professional success, before being made permanent by a parish commission in the 2010s. The festivities combine religious and secular elements: a large procession with several andores, the “Carro Triunfante” from which children sing the hymn to Senhora de Cima, and the “Dança do Rei David”, also called the “dance of the Moorish king”, presented locally as a reminiscence of the Muslim presence in the Baixo Minho region. The celebrations are accompanied by an arraial minhoto, with desgarradas, groups of bombos and fireworks.

=== Intangible heritage ===
The parish maintains several popular traditions of the Minho. In early January, the “Cantar as Janeiras”, traditional New Year begging songs, is practised as part of the intermunicipal gathering organized by the municipality of Celorico de Basto.

The heritage inventory also records material elements associated with traditional rural culture, including several espigueiros — maize granaries on stilts — concentrated in the hamlet of Quintela, as well as a sundial installed on one of them.

== Bibliography ==
- Piel, Joseph M. (1945). "As águas na toponímia galego-portuguesa". Boletim de Filologia (in Portuguese). 8 (1): 309–311.
- Sampaio, Jorge Davide (2007). "A Estela antropomórfica do Castro de Barrega (Borba da Montanha, Celorico de Basto, Braga)". Conimbriga (in Portuguese) (46): 53–72.
- Dias, João José Alves (2004). Chancelarias Portuguesas. D. João I. Volume I, Tomo 1 (1384–1385) (in Portuguese). Centro de Estudos Históricos da Universidade Nova de Lisboa.
- Fernandes, A. de Almeida (1977). "A Nobreza na época Vímaro-Portugalense. Problemas e relatórios". Revista de Guimarães (in Portuguese) (87): 7–102.
