= Arnóia =

Civil parish in Portugal

- Civil parish
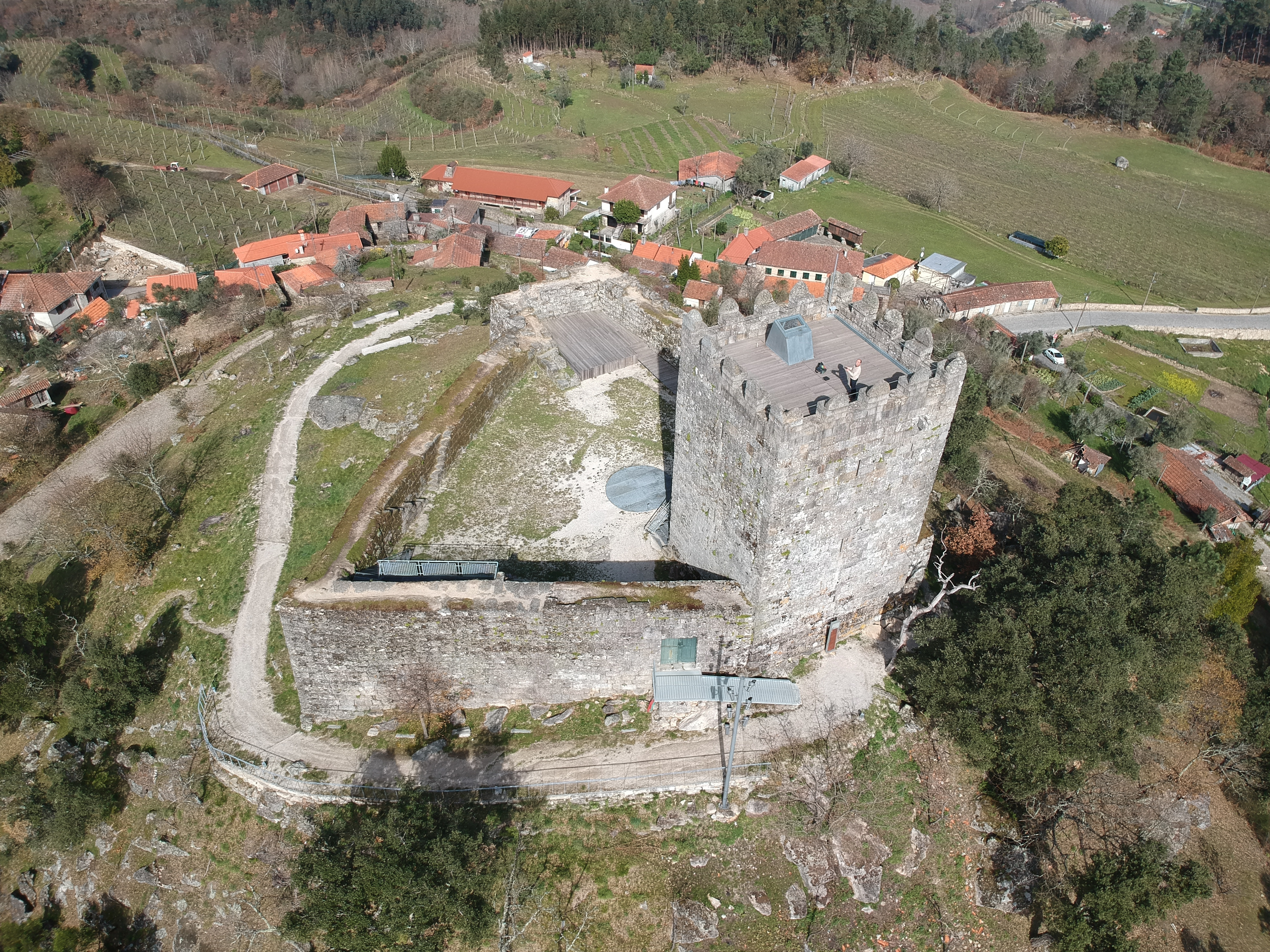
- Castle of Arnóia
- Interactive map of Arnóia
- Coordinates: 41.367222°N 8.015833°W
- Country: Portugal
- Region: Norte
- Intermunicipal community: Tâmega e Sousa
- District: Braga
- Municipality: Celorico de Basto

Area
  - Total: 18.73 km^{2} (7.23 sq mi)

Population (2021)
  - Total: 1,512
  - Density: 80.73/km^{2} (209.1/sq mi)
- Demonym: arnoiense
- Time zone: UTC+0 (WET)
  - Summer (DST): UTC+1 (WEST)

Arnóia, also spelled Arnoia, is a Portuguese locality and civil parish in the municipality of Celorico de Basto, in the Braga District and the Norte Region. It belongs to the intermunicipal community of Tâmega e Sousa.

It had 1,512 inhabitants in 2021 and covers an area of 18.73 km², corresponding to a population density of about 80.7 inhabitants per km². The population, which peaked at more than 2,100 inhabitants in the mid-20th century, has declined steadily since the 1980s.

Arnóia has a significant medieval heritage, centred on the Castle of Arnóia, classified as a national monument since 1946, and the Monastery of São Bento de Arnóia. These monuments reflect the historical role of the parish, which was the seat of the concelho of the Terras de Basto until its transfer to Britelo in 1719.

== Geography ==
Arnóia is located in the eastern part of the municipality of Celorico de Basto, in the Braga District, within the Tâmega e Sousa intermunicipal community. The civil parish covers an area of 18.73 km², about one tenth of the total area of the municipality, which covers 181.07 km².

The territory has rugged relief, with an average elevation of about 343 m, ranging from 92 to 657 m. It lies within the mountainous setting of the Tâmega e Sousa area, broadly framed by the massifs of the Alvão, the Cabreira and the Marão, with alternating plateaus and narrow valleys descending towards the Tâmega River. The Castle of Arnóia, built on a rocky spur overlooking the former Vila de Basto, illustrates this topography.

== History ==
=== Ancient occupation of the site ===
Human occupation in the territory of the municipality of Celorico de Basto dates back at least to the Middle Neolithic, as shown in particular by the group of funerary tumuli on the Planalto da Lameira. Several castros from the Iron Age are also attested in neighbouring civil parishes, including those of Ladário, in Ribas, Barrega, in Borba de Montanha, and Ourilhe.

In Arnóia, occupation prior to the medieval construction of the castle remains poorly documented. According to a tradition repeated by several authors, the castle may have been built on the site of an earlier Roman castro or Visigothic citânia, an interpretation consistent with the Roman strategy of occupying heights overlooking routes of communication, but not confirmed by documentary sources. The discovery, within the castle enclosure, of Roman coins attributed to Emperor Constantine nevertheless attests to activity at the site as early as Late Antiquity.

=== Medieval period ===
Arnóia is one of the oldest sites in the municipality of Celorico de Basto. The construction of the Castle of Arnóia probably dates to the late 10th or early 11th century, in the context of the wider process of castle-building that marked Western Europe at the time. The fortress, built on a rocky spur, is associated with the defence of the nearby Monastery of São Bento de Arnóia, founded in the same period.

The castle and its territory are mentioned in the Inquirições of 1258, during the reign of Afonso III of Portugal. These royal inquiries attest to the integration of Arnóia into the military, fiscal and seigneurial organization of the kingdom: several casais from the civil parishes of Arnóia, Caçarilhe and Carvalho were required to feed the castle's guard dogs and to provide the lime necessary for its maintenance.

Arnóia became the seat of the former Vila de Basto, the administrative centre of the Terras de Basto. The settlement housed the institutions of the concelho, including the council house, prison and pillory, of which remains still survive.

=== Transfer of the municipal seat ===
In the early 18th century, the isolation of the settlement led to the transfer of the administrative centre. By royal provision of 21 April 1719, John V of Portugal transferred the seat of the concelho from Arnóia to the place of Freixieiro, in the parish of Britelo, renamed for the occasion Vila Nova de Freixieiro, now Celorico de Basto. This transfer accelerated the decline of the former Vila de Basto: by 1758, the castle already showed signs of ruin.

=== Contemporary period ===
The Castle of Arnóia was classified as a national monument on 15 March 1946. It underwent restoration campaigns between 1960 and 1963, followed by archaeological excavations in 2002 and the creation of an interpretation centre in 2004. Since 2010, it has been part of the Rota do Românico; in 2020, its management was transferred from the Portuguese state to the municipality of Celorico de Basto.

== Demographics ==
The recorded population of the civil parish of Arnóia evolved as follows:

Year	Population	Change
1864	1,768	—
1878	1,939	+9.7%
1890	2,145	+10.6%
1900	1,754	−18.2%
1911	1,844	+5.1%
1920	1,815	−1.6%
1930	1,840	+1.4%
1940	2,151	+16.9%
1950	2,157	+0.3%
1960	2,108	−2.3%
1970	2,169	+2.9%
1981	2,055	−5.3%
1991	1,901	−7.5%
2001	1,919	+0.9%
2011	1,702	−11.3%
2021	1,512	−11.2%

The population reached its maximum in 1970, with 2,169 inhabitants, before declining overall from the 1980s onwards.

=== Age distribution ===
The age distribution of the population was as follows:

Year	0–14 years	15–24 years	25–64 years	65 years and over
2001	347	294	898	380
2011	209	242	876	375
2021	163	146	803	400

Between 2001 and 2021, the population aged 0 to 14 decreased sharply, while the number of inhabitants aged 65 and over increased, reflecting an ageing population.

== Heritage ==
The heritage of the civil parish includes the Castle of Arnóia, also known as the Castle of the Moors or Castle of Moreira, the Pillory of Castelo and the Monastery of São Bento de Arnóia, with its church, wayside cross, fountain-oratory, mills, granary and agricultural dependencies.

The Castle of Arnóia is listed among the national monuments of the Braga District.

== See also ==
- Celorico de Basto
- Castle of Arnóia
- Monastery of São Bento de Arnóia
- Pillory of Castelo
- List of national monuments of Portugal
- Rota do Românico
