= Alvite (Cabeceiras de Basto) =

- Civil parish
- Location in Portugal
- Coordinates: 41°29′57″N 8°0′26″W
- Country: Portugal
- Region: Norte
- Intermunic. comm.: Ave
- District: Braga
- Municipality: Cabeceiras de Basto
- Disbanded: 2013

Area
  - Total: 7.97 km^{2} (3.08 sq mi)

Population (2011)
  - Total: 963
  - Density: 120/km^{2} (310/sq mi)
- Time zone: UTC+00:00 (WET)
  - Summer (DST): UTC+01:00 (WEST)

Alvite is a former civil parish in the municipality of Cabeceiras de Basto, Portugal. In 2013, the parish merged into the new parish Alvite e Passos.
