= Alvite e Passos =

- Civil parish
- Location in Portugal
- Coordinates: 41.498°N 8.007°W
- Country: Portugal
- Region: Norte
- Intermunic. comm.: Ave
- District: Braga
- Municipality: Cabeceiras de Basto

Area
  - Total: 12.19 km^{2} (4.71 sq mi)

Population (2011)
  - Total: 1,184
  - Density: 97.13/km^{2} (251.6/sq mi)
- Time zone: UTC+00:00 (WET)
  - Summer (DST): UTC+01:00 (WEST)

Alvite e Passos is a civil parish in the municipality of Cabeceiras de Basto, Portugal. It was formed in 2013 by the merger of the former parishes Alvite and Passos. The population in 2011 was 1,184, in an area of 12.19 km^{2} (4.71 sq mi).
