= European route E805 =

Road in trans-European E-road network

E805

Route information
- Length: 124 km (77 mi)

Major junctions
- From: Vila Nova de Famalicão
- To: Chaves

Location
- Countries: Portugal

Highway system
- International E-road network; A Class; B Class

European route E 805 is a European B class road in Portugal, connecting the cities of Vila Nova de Famalicão – Chaves.

== Route ==
- Portugal
  - Vila Nova de Famalicão
  - E801 Chaves
