= A28 motorway (Portugal) =

Road in Portugal

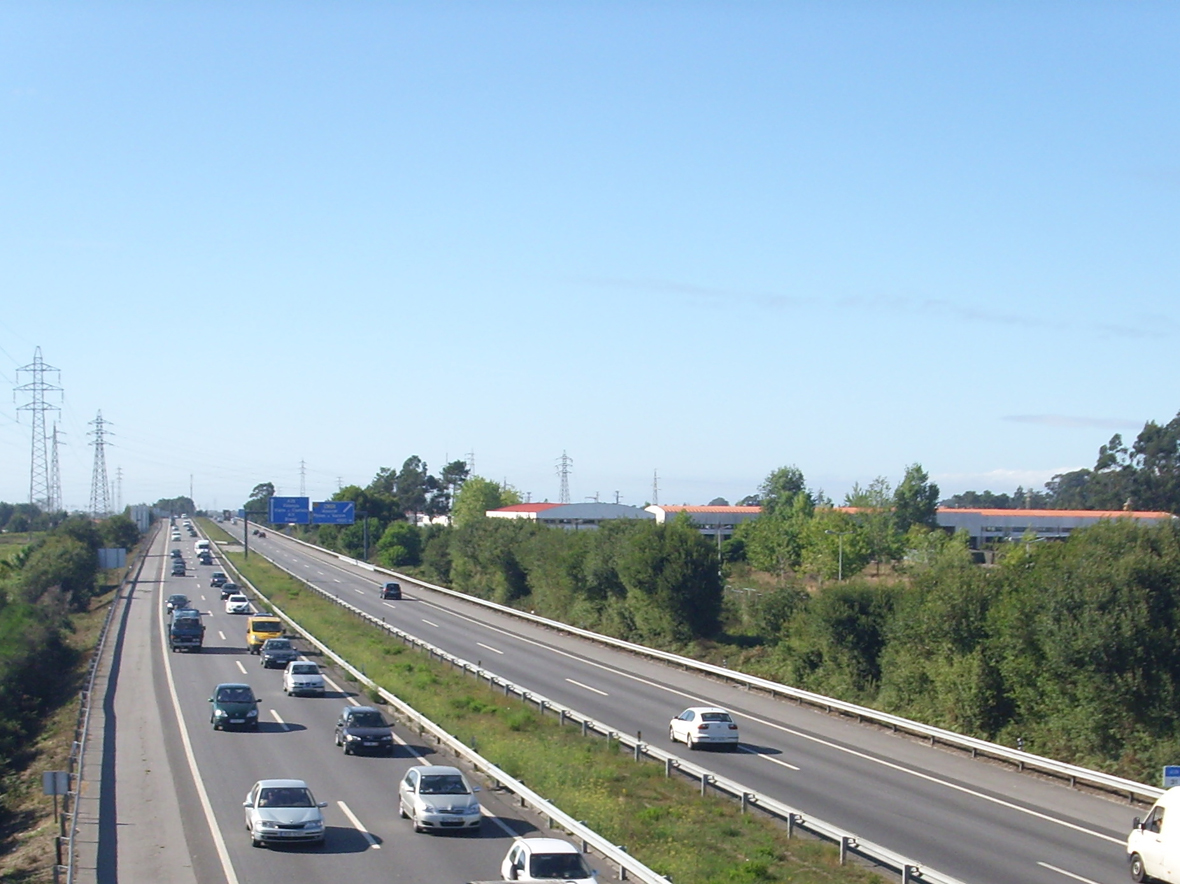
Overlooking A28 Freeway/Motorway in Portugal

A28 is a motorway (freeway) in Portugal. It connects Porto to Viana do Castelo, further extending to Valença, on the border with Galicia (Spain). It crosses with the A27, A7, A11, and A41 motorways.

The motorway is a toll motorway. In May 2024, a proposal was approved to discontinue tolls on the A28 between Viana do Castelo and Esposende.
