= Classification of Built Heritage in Portugal =

The Classification of Built Heritage in Portugal corresponds to a group or independent Portuguese archeological civic, military and religious cultural properties deemed to be of sufficient historical value by the Direção-Geral do Património Cultural for protection and conservation. The precise rules for the classification and protection of cultural properties are defined in a heritage registry, that includes inventories of the natural and man-made, tangible and intangible, movable and immovable properties of a cultural, esthetic, social, technical and scientific nature.

== History ==
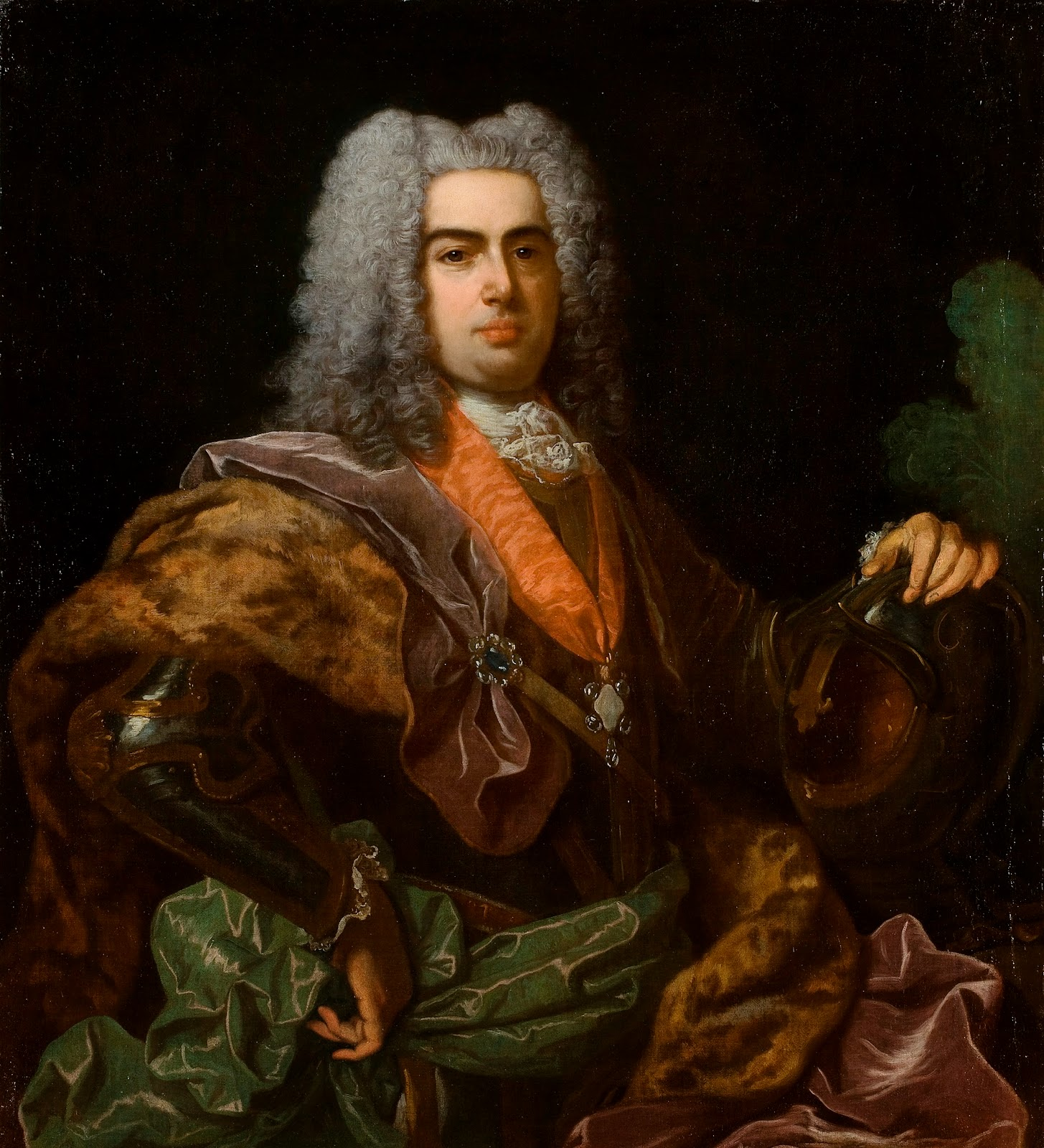
King D. John V of Portugal, first to decree an inventory of ancient built heritage in Portuguese territory

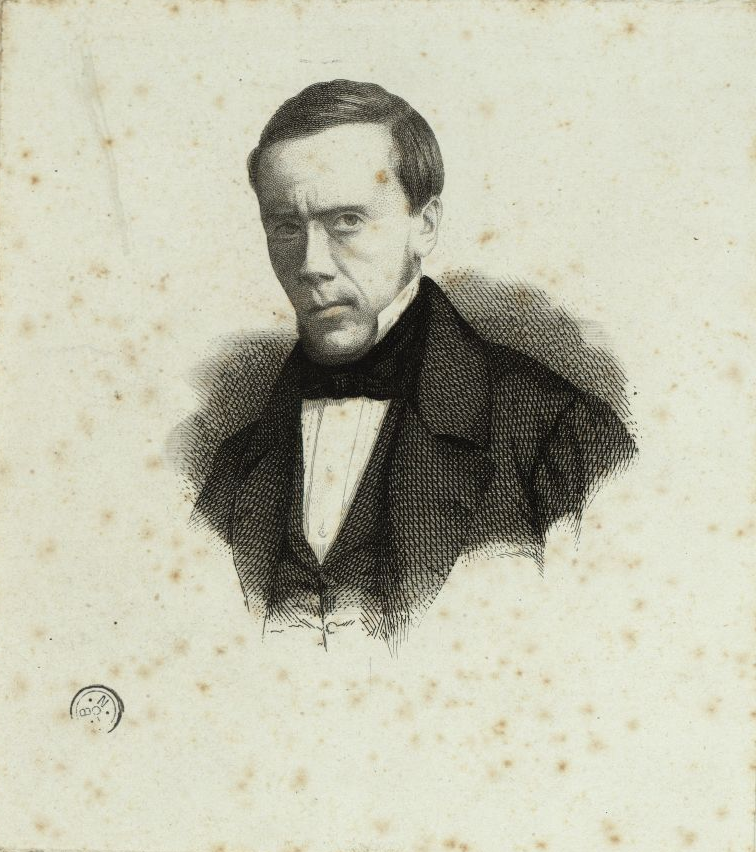
Alexandre Herculano (1852), who authored several texts on preservation of architectural heritage

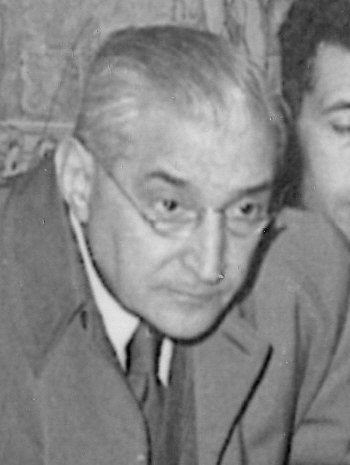
Antonio de Oliveira Salazar a nationalist vision of cultural heritage and built patrimony

From the beginning of the 19th century, the Portuguese State formally began to affirm the need to protect cultural heritage, that had its antecedents in the 18th century. The first conscientious move came from King John V, who induced the Academia Real de História (Royal Academy of History) to inventory and conserve "the ancient Monuments that existed and they could discover in the Kingdom, when it was dominated by the Phoenicians, Greeks, Penos, Romans, Goths and Arab" (decreed on 20 August 1721). This decree reinforced the need to safeguard the Portuguese monuments by determining its condition, even if it was in a state of ruin, but did not require their classification. Following the destruction caused by 1755 Lisbon earthquake, there was a comprehension that works of art and buildings needed to be conserved owing to their fragility (exposed by the ruin caused by the earthquake).

Later, the extinction of the religious orders in 1834, which resulted in the expropriation of lands and buildings by the State, helped to motivate further the need to establish an organ of the State, or association, that could protect and conserve cultural possessions. At that time various personalities, such as Almeida Garrett (1799-1854) and Alexandre Herculano (1810-1877), alerted the public to the need for legislative protection for built heritage. Alexandre Herculano, for his part, authored various pioneering texts for the movement, writing four works on monuments, published in the magazine "O Panorama", between 1838 and 1839. In 1863, theAssociação dos Arquitetos Civis Portugueses (Portuguese Association of Civil Architects), later the Real Associação dos Arquitetos Civis e Arqueológos Portugueses (RAACAP) (Portuguese Royal Association of Civil Architects and Archaeologists), presided by Joaquim Possidónio Narciso da Silva (1806-1896), took on the role of intervention. In 1880, the RAACAP published a report that was commissioned by the Ministério de Obras Publicas (Ministry of Public Works) that suggested why some properties of a cultural heritage should be considered national monuments. They divided those buildings and structures into six groups: art, buildings that were significant in art history, military monuments, statues, monuments and commemorative arches, and pre-historic monuments. This was the first uniform, systematic process to define possessions as important national treasures needing protection.

The first legal definition of a national monument occurred on 27 February 1894. By the beginning of the 20th century, a concrete classification act emerged on 24 October 1901; it was the first legal framework to explicitly define what was national heritage. This decree gave the Conselho dos Monumentos Nacionais (National Monuments Council), of the Direção-Geral das Obras Públicas e Minas (Directorate-General of Public Works and Mines), presided by Joaquim Possidónio Narciso da Silva, the mission to classify national monuments. As a legal document, it required the establishment of criteria for classifying built heritage, that included historic, artistic and archeological value. Beginning with the Castle of Elvas in 1906, 14 other buildings were classified as national monuments: the Monastery of Batalha, Monastery of Santa Maria de Belem, the Convent of Christ, the Monastery of Alcobaça, the Convent of Mafra, the Old Cathedral of Coimbra, Cathedral of Guarda, Cathedral of Lisbon, Cathedral of Évora, Church of Santa Cruz of Coimbra, the Basilicia of Coração de Jesus, the Tower of São Vicente, Roman ruins of the Temple of Évora and the ruins of the Church of Nossa Senhora do Carmo. Four years later, the remaining buildings identified by the RAACAP in 1880 (approximately 467 structures) were classified in this framework; this represented the conscious understanding of what was a built heritage (and the State's role in its protection) and identified that conditions existed to create laws, institutions and criteria for protecting national patrimony.

On 18 December 1924, it became obligatory (under decree 1/700) that a partnership was necessary with Conselho Superior de Belas Artes (Superior Council of Fine Arts) for work to be done in areas occupied by a classified monument. It was only in 1926 (decree 11/445) when specific zones of protection, approximately 50 metres (160 ft), were established around these properties, along with the classification of properties of public interest associated with archaeological sites. Two years later, this classification applied for all building types. On 7 March 1932, decree 20/985 established a regime of protection based on artistic, historic or archaeological value, differentiating between national monuments and properties of public interest, resulting in the necessity to expand the notion of cultural heritage.

On 30 April 1929, under decree 16.791, with the distribution of national monuments, the Ministério da Instrução Pública (Ministry for Public Instruction) which was responsible for this area was extinguished, leading to the establishment of the Direção Geral dos Edifícios e Monumentos Nacionais (DGEMN) (Directorate-General for Buildings and National Monuments). A DGEMN remained active until 2007, and had the principal mission to support public works on classified monuments, but was criticized in the 1940s for its work in restorations during the Estado Novo period. The DGEMN, as an extension of the Salazar regime wa integral in fomenting the nationalist image of a moral State that was materially restored by the regime. During this time, the DGEMN based its work on medieval restoration that involved removing later built structures and restoring these buildings to their "original" state, discarding the elements that were added following this period. The DGMEN was criticized for its role, but the model for intervention and restoration established by this institution was already embedded in the concepts and practices of the period. Yet, architect Raul Lino (1879-1974), was one of the figures who opposed the organization's policies, affirming the preoccupation for a purity of style was the disgrace of many monuments. Further, Maria João Neto highlighted the important role of art in the chronology and important factor in national monuments. Beginning in 1931, the first international charters on patrimony began to emerge following the destruction caused by the first World War. The 1931 Athens Charter, originated from the Athens Congress (21-30 October 1931) which introduced the use of new materials, such as reinforced concrete. This resulted in decree 20/925 (7 March 1932), which resulted in restorations that were carried out by the DGEMN.

In decree 21/885 (18 November 1936), protection zones were established to safeguard public buildings of architectural value or those to protect built heritage around non-classified national monuments. These required the authorization from the Ministério de Obras Públicas e Comunicações (Ministry of Public Works and Communications) to construct or remodel and prohibited the municipal councils from conceding licenses for construction in those zones. On 10 June 1940 (decree 30/615, 25 July), the concordat with the Vatican re-instituted catholic churches as property of the Church, except when those structures were classified as national monuments or properties of public interest, under article 21. On 11 October 1945 (decree 34/993) determined protection zones for public buildings not classified as national monuments, establishing protection under decree 21/875, that were established by the Ministry, under proposals of the general directorate of urban services. Further, on 11 June 1949, by decree the municipal councils were also provided the competencies to promote (along with responsible entities) the classification of national monuments or those of public interest in their respective municipalities, thereby establishing a new precedent.

The 1964 Venice Charter, that resulted from the 2nd International Congress of Architects and Historical Monument Technicians, was signed by the Portuguese representative Luís Benavente (1902-1993), resulting in the creation of the ICOMOS Conselho Internacional de Monumentos e Sítios (International Council for Monuments and Sites).

After 25 April 1974, the State altered the public administration, with the objective passing the competencies of management of built heritage to the cultural ministry. On 6 June 1979, under decree 49/79, Portugal adopted the Convention for Safeguarding Cultural World Heritage and Nature resulting, three years later, in the first World Heritage classifications: the Historic Centre of Angra do Heroísmo, the Monastery of Batalha, the Convent of Christ, the Monastery of Santa Maria de Belem and Tower of Belem. Today, there are 15 Portuguese sites recognized as World Heritage Sites. In 1985, the first law to safeguard cultural patrimony (which also included a reference to immaterial patrimony) was instituted. Later, it was substituted by Decree 107/2001 (8 September 2001), which established the political basis for a political regime for protection, appreciation and classification of built heritage.

== Classification ==
The headquarters of IGESPAR (Institute for the Management of Architectural and Archaeological Heritage), the institute that succeeded the DEGMEN, located in a portion of the Palace of Ajuda

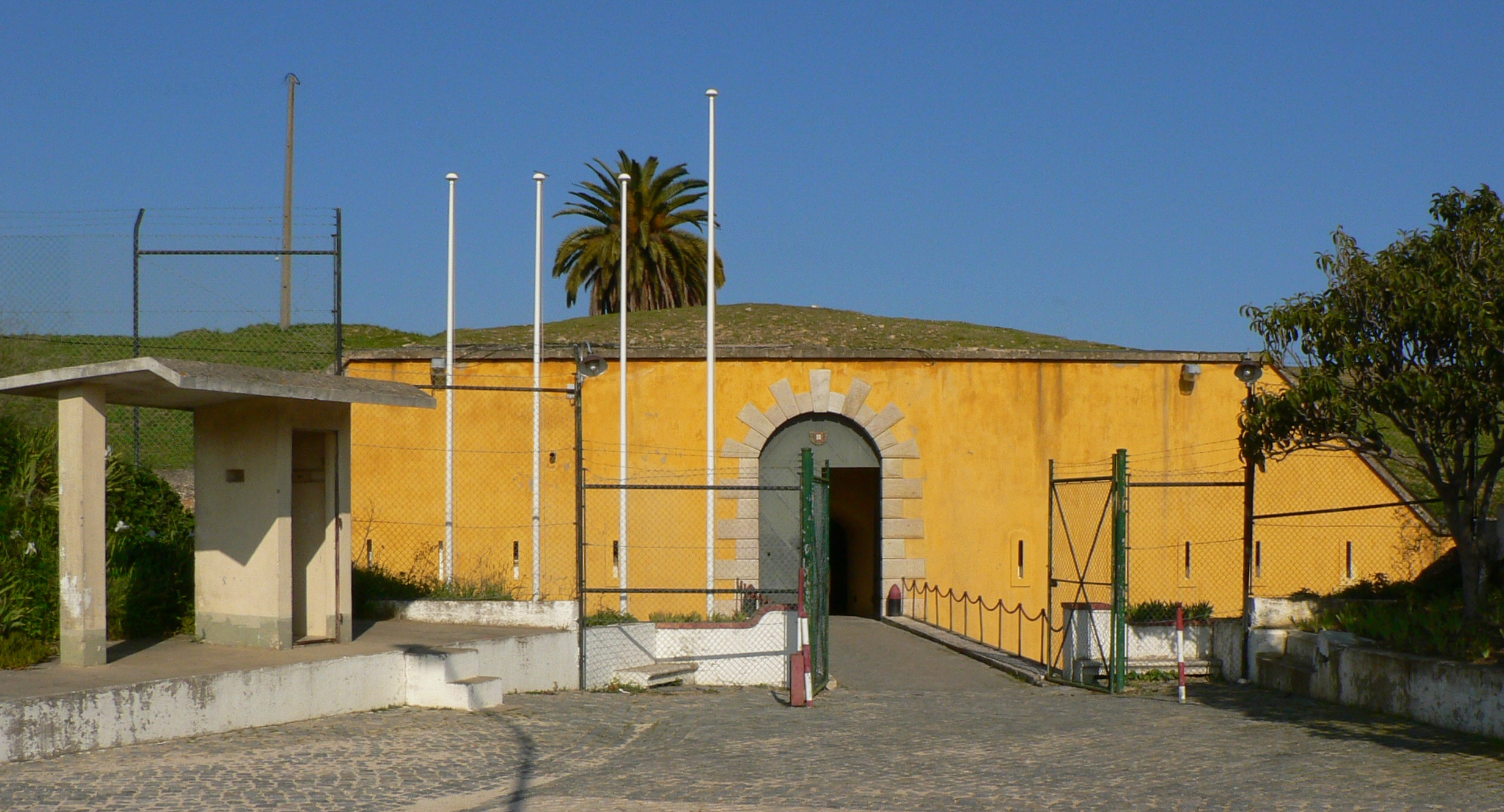
The Fort of Sacavém, the home to SIPA (Information System of Patrimonial Architecture), the database for nationally registered monuments

Owing to their relative value, the properties can obtain one of several classifications, that include: National Monuments, Properties of Public Interest or Properties of Municipal Interest. These protected possessions are further defined into three distinct categories in accordance with international conventions:

- Monument: architectural constructions of important composition or modest origin owing to their historic, archaeological, artistic, scientific, technical or social interest including the installations or decorative elements that are integrated into architecture, as well as monumental sculptures or paintings;
- Group: urban or rural architectural groups with sufficient cohesion that can be delimited geographically and can be simultaneously notable for their unity or integration in the landscape and for its historical, archaeological, artistic, scientific or social interest;
- Site: human works or group of humans or nature with sufficient spatial homogeneous characteristics that can be delimited geographically, as well as notable for their historic, archaeologic, artistic, scientific or social interest.

=== Process ===
To analyze and execute a classification a competent initiator can be any citizen or body (public or private), whether that be Portuguese or foreign. The process starts with a simple submission of a form, but includes various phases, culminating in an accord. This includes:

- Pre-analysis - where the proposal is analyzed and determined the pertinence of the suggestion;
- Opening and audition - contact with the municipality or property-owner and the proponent of the classification;
- Analysis of technical specifications - investigation and analysis, characterization and appreciation;
- Homologation - advisory board opinion of the DGPC (or competent organ) and homologation/ratification in part by the Ministério da Cultura (Ministry of Culture);
- Divulgation - publication of the classification and attribution of the property, in addition to the opening of process of a complaints process;
- Publication of the classification in the Diário da República and communication to the conservatory of Land Registry;

The classification of Portuguese heritage is the final process of the administrative procedure that determines the cultural value of architectural constructions to the State.

The organ responsible for the classification and protection of built heritage is the Direção-Geral do Património Cultural, a central service of the administrative law of the State.

A competent party can propose to the Secretary-of-State for Culture, which can proceed (or not) to the respective homologation, in order to provide an adequate classification for Portuguese cultural heritage, in a way that protects and conserves its historic and architectural value, in addition to its evolution.

The process of inventorying and attributing the classification to the Portuguese property is governed by the Lei de bases do património: Estabelece as bases da política e do regime de protecção e valorização do património cultural, approved 8 September 2001 by the Portuguese legislative assembly.

This law was altered with the publication of Decree 309/2009 (23 October 2010) that altered the procedure to classify properties and cultural heritage, in addition to providing a jurisdictional regime for protection zones and the detailed plans used for safeguarding that heritage.

The owner of the classified property has the right to be informed of all acts, appreciations and protection of the heritage designation, and indemnified when there is a prohibition or restriction to its normal use. The property-owner of the classified property has the obligation, under certain conditions, to ensure the legal regime to access and permit public visit, as well as to carry out the works necessary to ensure the safeguard of the property after prior opinion of the regulatory body. In case of transfer of ownership, the State and the municipality have preemptive rights under certain conditions.

From the moment the process reaches the classification stage, a Special Protection Zone (ZPE) of 50 metres (160 ft) is created immediately from the external limits of the property, based on contours defined from level altimetry or references in the landscape (ridges of hills, riverbeds and others). In these protection zones, no construction may be carried out without the prior opinion and authorization of the regulatory body in order to minimize the constructive impacts on the area or to safeguard the archaeological grounds.

The inventory process is completed to obtain a survey of the cultural assets existing at national level, with a view to their identification. The classified assets, as well as those that are in the process of classification, regardless of the result, must be inventoried. Only exceptionally, unlisted assets belonging to private individuals and to natural persons shall be included in the inventory without their agreement.

The inventory is protected in order to prevent its destruction or to preserve it and to publicize its existence.

=== Classified ===
The classification of properties of cultural heritage resulted from legislation instituted between 2001 and 2009, and includes:

- those properties can be classified in several categories (Monumento, Group or Site), as defined by international law;
- those properties can be classified in terms of the national, public or municipal public interest.

A property is considered of national interest when its protection or appreciation, in total or in part, represents a significant cultural value to the nation. These possessions can only be classified as of a national interest when its ruin or degradation may result in its irreparable cultural loss, as defined by Government decree.

A property is considered of public interest when its national protection or appreciation represent a cultural value of national importance, but for which the protection regime inherent in being of national interest may be disproportionate. Property belonging to private individuals may be classified if their loss may constitute a serious damage or irreparable cultural loss to the cultural heritage (classification in the form of an ordinance).

A property of municipal interest is considered to be possessions whose protection and appreciation, in whole or in part, represent a cultural value of predominant meaning for a given municipality. It is only possible to classify movable property of municipal interest with the consent of the respective owners.

Classified heritage as Defined by DGPC
Class	Initials	Type	EN	No.
National	MN	Monumento Nacional	National Monument	808
Municipal Interest	MIM	Monumento de Interesse Municipal	Monument of Municipal Interest	107
Public Interest	MIP	Monumento de Interesse Público	Monument of Public Interest	501
Municipal Interest	IIP	Imóvel de Interesse Municipal	Property of Municipal Interest	458
Public Interest	IIP	Imóvel de Interesse Público	Property of Public Interest	2069
Municipal Interest	CIM	Conjunto de Interesse Municipal	Group of Municipal Interest	12
Public Interest	CIP	Conjunto de Interesse Público	Group of Public Interest	48
Municipal Interest	SIM	Sítio de Interesse Municipal	Site of Municipal Interest	10
Public Interest	SIP	Sítio de Interesse Público	Site of Public Interest	71
Total				4084

=== Unclassified ===
Properties which follow the classification process, may loss their legal protection, if the process expires (Decree 309/2009; Diário da República, Série I, 206, 23 October 2009). During the process of confirmation, the property is classified as "not applicable", as are those structures whose process was archived or closed.

On 1 January 2011, there were a number of cases that were archived owing to their lengthy processes. In these cases, properties under assessment had taken three to four decades without a final decision being made, owing to a lack of staff to handle the processes. By archiving these process, this left many properties outside the legal framework for protection.
