= Celorico de Basto =

- Municipality
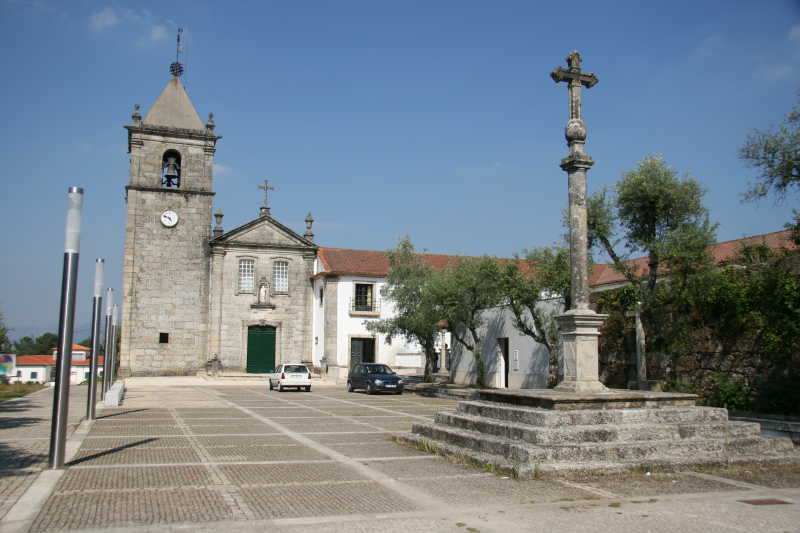
- Monastery of St. John Arnóia

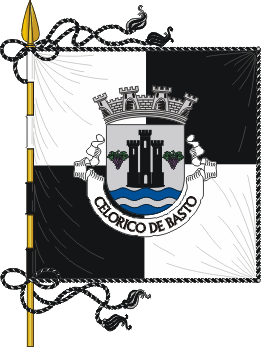
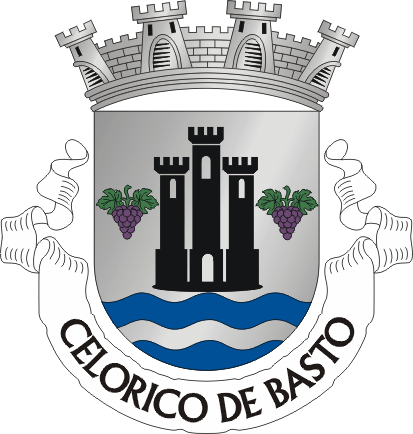
- Flag Coat of arms
- Interactive map of Celorico de Basto
- Location in Portugal
- Coordinates: 41°23′N 8°00′W
- Country: Portugal
- Region: Norte
- Intermunic. comm.: Tâmega e Sousa
- District: Braga
- Parishes: 15

Government
  - President: Joaquim Mota e Silva (PSD)

Area
  - Total: 181.07 km^{2} (69.91 sq mi)

Population (2021)
  - Total: 17,643
  - Density: 97.437/km^{2} (252.36/sq mi)
- Time zone: UTC+00:00 (WET)
  - Summer (DST): UTC+01:00 (WEST)
- Postal code: 4890
- Website: www.cm-celoricobasto.pt

Celorico de Basto (Portuguese: [sɨluˈɾiku ðɨ ˈβaʃtu]) is a municipality in Braga District in Portugal. The population in 2021 was 17,643, in an area of 181.07 square kilometres (69.91 mi^{2}). The town of Celorico de Basto has around 2,500 inhabitants. The municipality is located bordering the municipality of Cabeceiras de Basto to the north, Mondim de Basto to the east, Amarante to the south, Felgueiras to the southeast and Fafe to the west.

The present mayor is José Peixoto Lima, elected by the Social Democratic Party. The municipal holiday is July 25, when they celebrate James the Great (São Tiago).

Celorico de Basto has been occupied since ancient times, as witness marks in the most ancient civilisations have left here.

== Parishes ==
Administratively, the municipality is divided into 15 civil parishes (freguesias):

- Agilde
- Arnóia
- Borba de Montanha
- Britelo, Gémeos e Ourilhe
- Caçarilhe e Infesta
- Canedo de e Corgo
- Carvalho e Basto (Santa Tecla)
- Codeçoso
- Fervença
- Moreira do Castelo
- Rego
- Ribas
- São Clemente de Basto
- Vale de Bouro
- Veade, Gagos e Molares

== Tourism ==
The municipality of Celorico de Basto has a vast historical and architectural, civil, and religious heritage and a great diversity of places of tourist interest to visit. From its diversification of tradition, the Castle of Arnoia, the Monastery of Arnoia, as well as the Romanesque churches of Veade, Fervença, and Ribas are highlighted.

Stand out from among the various monuments and places to visit:

- Arnoia Castle, the only Castle on the Romanesque Route, located in the village of Basto;
- Monastery of São Bento de Arnoia, Benedictine monastery;
- Natural Trail of Tâmega;
- Church of the Savior of Fervença, part of the Route of the Romanesque;
- Church of Salvador de Ribas, part of the Route of the Romanesque;
- Church of Santa Maria de Veade, part of the Route of the Romanesque;
- Estela of Vila Boa;
- Municipal Library of Celorico de Basto Prof. Marcelo Rebelo de Sousa;
- Freixieiro Ludic Park;
- Quinta do Prado, with its house and gardens.

== Festivities ==
- Festa Internacional das Camélias

== Gastronomy ==
In the municipality of Celorico de Basto, stands out the Pão de ló and the cavacas. The special condiment is Green wine, of demarcated quality and very particular flavour and aroma.

== Twin towns – sister cities ==
Celorico de Basto is twinned with:

- Houilles, France (1973)
- Wiltz, Luxembourg
- Cambados, Spain (2019)

== Notable people ==
- Rodrigo José Rodrigues (1879-1963) a military physician, colonial administrator and politician
- António Ribeiro (1928–1998) a Portuguese Cardinal of the Roman Catholic Church, who was Patriarch of Lisbon from 1971 to 1998
