= Inquirições =

Royal Portuguese commissions

Inquirições were the Royal Portuguese commissions and official reports. They were put forward by the crown of Portugal to accomplish royal edicts, primarily through the royal chancery.

Afonso II instituted (from 1220) inquirições to investigate the nature of holdings and to recover whatever had been illegally taken from the crown. This issue was in response to the church's rein over Portuguese land as they supported Afonso's fight in the civil war with Sancho II. These included examination of local noble titles and rights, including investigation of properties, lands and incomes against royal charters that had been issued.

== The General Inquirições ==
The general Inquirições were issued by King Afonso III in 1258 to investigate the nature of holdings and to recover whatever had been illegally taken from the crown. The royal commissions were met with much protest by the prelates as it would have deprived the church of much property. Most of the prelates subsequently left the country.

Although Afonso was excommunicated and threatened with deposition, he continued to defy the church until shortly before his death early in 1279. Eventually, through the royal commission, centralized territories such as Trás-os-Montes were placed under control of the Crown and led to the compilation of valuable information essential to the study of Portuguese medieval history.
