= Direção-Geral do Património Cultural =

General directorate of the Government of Portugal

General-Directorate of Cultural Heritage
- Direção-Geral do Património Cultural
- The seal/logo of the DGPC

- The institution is located in the National Palace of Ajuda

Directorate-General overview
- Formed: May 25, 2012
- Preceding agencies: IPPAR Instituto Português do Património Arquitetónico; IGESPAR Instituto de Gestão do Património Arquitetónico e Arqueológico
- Jurisdiction: Portugal
- Headquarters: Ajuda, Lisbon; 38°42′27.34″N 9°11′53.98″W
- Directorate-General executives: Paula Araújo da Silva, Director-General; João Carlos dos Santos, Deputy Director-General; David Santos, Deputy Director-General; Filipe Campos Silva, Deputy Director-General; António Filipe Pimentel, Deputy Director-General
- Parent department: Ministério da Cultura
- Website: www.patrimoniocultural.gov.pt

The Direção-Geral do Património Cultural (DGPC) (Directorate-General for Cultural Heritage), formerly the Instituto de Gestão do Património Arquitectónico e Arqueológico (IGESPAR) (Institute for the Management of Architectural and Archaeological Heritage) and Instituto Português do Património Arquitetónico (IPPAR (Portuguese Institute for Architectural Heritage), is a general directorate of the Government of Portugal tasked with the conservation, preservation, and inventory of Portuguese architectural heritage. This includes buildings and sites of historical, architectural, scientific or artistic value. The institute keeps a registry of all the classified sites and issues legally binding opinions regarding any works on them.

== History ==
It was established after the initiatives of PRACE (which was a central administrative restructuring programme) and implemented by the Council of Ministers (Resolution No. 124, dated 4 August 2005), as decree 96/2007 (29 March 2007). IGESPAR resulted from a fusion of the Instituto Português do Património Arquitetónico (IPPAR) and the Instituto Português de Arqueologia (IPA), while integrating many of the functions of the Direcção Geral dos Edifícios e Monumentos Nacionais (DGEMN) which had been active in the conservation and rehabilitation of the country's architectural treasures.

Ministerial Order no.376 (20 March 2007) established its internal structure and statutes, while the Ministry of Culture's organic law established regional directorates (except in the Azores and Madeira, where cultural preservation programs were established under their respective Regional Secretaries).

Archival material, that until then were held by the DGEMN, were transferred to Instituto de Habitação e Reabilitação Urbana (Institute for Housing and Urban Rehabilitation) of the Ministério do Ambiente (Ministry of the Environment), the department of Ordenamento do Território e do Desenvolvimento Regional (Spatial Planning and Regional Development), under the auspices of the SIPA - Sistema de Informação para o Património Arquitectónico (Architectural Heritage Information System) on 30 May 2007. IGESPAR inherited the institutions and preceded the Biblioteca Geral (BG) (General Library) and Biblioteca de Arqueologia (BA) (Archaeological Library, which provided information on architectural and archaeological patrimony that was catalogued and available at physical locations and online. Until 2010, over 3000 properties within the territory were inventoried and classified by the institution, in addition 13 have been promoted to UNESCO World Heritage sites, 2000 to Imóveis de Interesse Público (Properties of Public Interest), 800 to status of Monumento Nacional (National Monuments) and 450 classified as municipal sites of public interest.

In 2012, following the promulgation of a decree, the Direção–Geral do Patrimônio Cultural (DGPC) was instituted, through the fusing of the IGESPAR, the Instituto dos Museus e Conservação (IMC IP) (Institute of Museums and Conservation) and Direção Regional de Cultura de Lisboa o Vale do Tejo (DRCLVT) (Lisboa e Vale do Tejo Regional Directorate of Culture).

== Structure ==
DGPC is a Directorate-General, under the auspices of the Ministério da Cultura (Ministry of Culture), with responsibilities for the architectural and archaeological heritage. Its internal structure is laid out in Ministerial Order no.376, dating to 20 March 2007, whereupon the organization is divided into five individual services:

- Salvaguarda (Safeguarding Department), which is responsible for coordinating and initiating studies on candidates for listing as national patrimony, the promotion of plans for safeguarding buildings, restrict or invalidate construction projects that infringe on national patrimony, and monitor, as well as implement projects to conserve national patrimony;
- Inventário, Estudos e Divulgação (Inventory, Studies and Dissemination Department), the department responsible for the physical analysis of the conditions, state and study of the national monuments or architecture of national interest, and provide technical assistance for listed patrimony;
- Projectos e Obras (Projects and Works Department), follows the conservation process of existing buildings and structures on site, providing solutions for existing degradation and promoting preventative solutions for existing sites;
- Jurídico (Law Department) provides legal decisions and supports IGESPAR's legal intervention on behalf of existing or ongoing investigations; and
- Gestão (Management Department), responsible for managing the ongoing structure of the organization and sustaining operations.

At the same time, it is also responsible for managing the operations of several of the nation's more importance architectural sites, including: the Convent of Christ in Tomar, the Monastery of Batalha in Batalha, the Monastery of Alcobaça, the Jeronimos Monastery and Tower of Belém in Santa Maria de Belém, the National Pantheon in the Church of Santa Engrácia, the Monastery of Santa Cruz in Coimbra and the Archeological Park of the Côa Valley.

With extinction of IGESPAR and IMC, on 29 December 2011, the DGPC began to assume the competencies and attributes of the two extinguished organs, namely:

- Proposed the classification and inventoried the archaeological or architectural possessions of national or public interest, that obligated the establishment of special protection zones;
- Develop plans, programs and projects to execute restorations and interventions into classified properties or those in the process of classification, situated in their respective zones of protection;
- Secure the management and appreciation of archaeological or architectural heritage;
- Promote and secure the inventory of the cultural heritage;
- Pronounce over the impact of publica and private plans and projects, and to propose protective or corrective measures to safeguard cultural heritage.

== See also ==
- Classification of Built Heritage in Portugal
