= Arco de Baúlhe e Vila Nune =

- Civil parish
- Location in Portugal
- Coordinates: 41.487°N 7.966°W
- Country: Portugal
- Region: Norte
- Intermunic. comm.: Ave
- District: Braga
- Municipality: Cabeceiras de Basto

Area
  - Total: 9.04 km^{2} (3.49 sq mi)

Population (2011)
  - Total: 2,048
  - Density: 227/km^{2} (587/sq mi)
- Time zone: UTC+00:00 (WET)
  - Summer (DST): UTC+01:00 (WEST)

Arco de Baúlhe e Vila Nune is a civil parish in the municipality of Cabeceiras de Basto, northern Portugal. It was formed in 2013 by the merger of the former parishes Arco de Baúlhe and Vila Nune. The population in 2011 was 2,048, in an area of 9.04 km^{2} (3.49 sq mi). Arco de Baúlhe had a railway station between 1949 and 1990 - the northern terminus of the Tâmega line.
