= Cabeceiras de Basto =

- Municipality
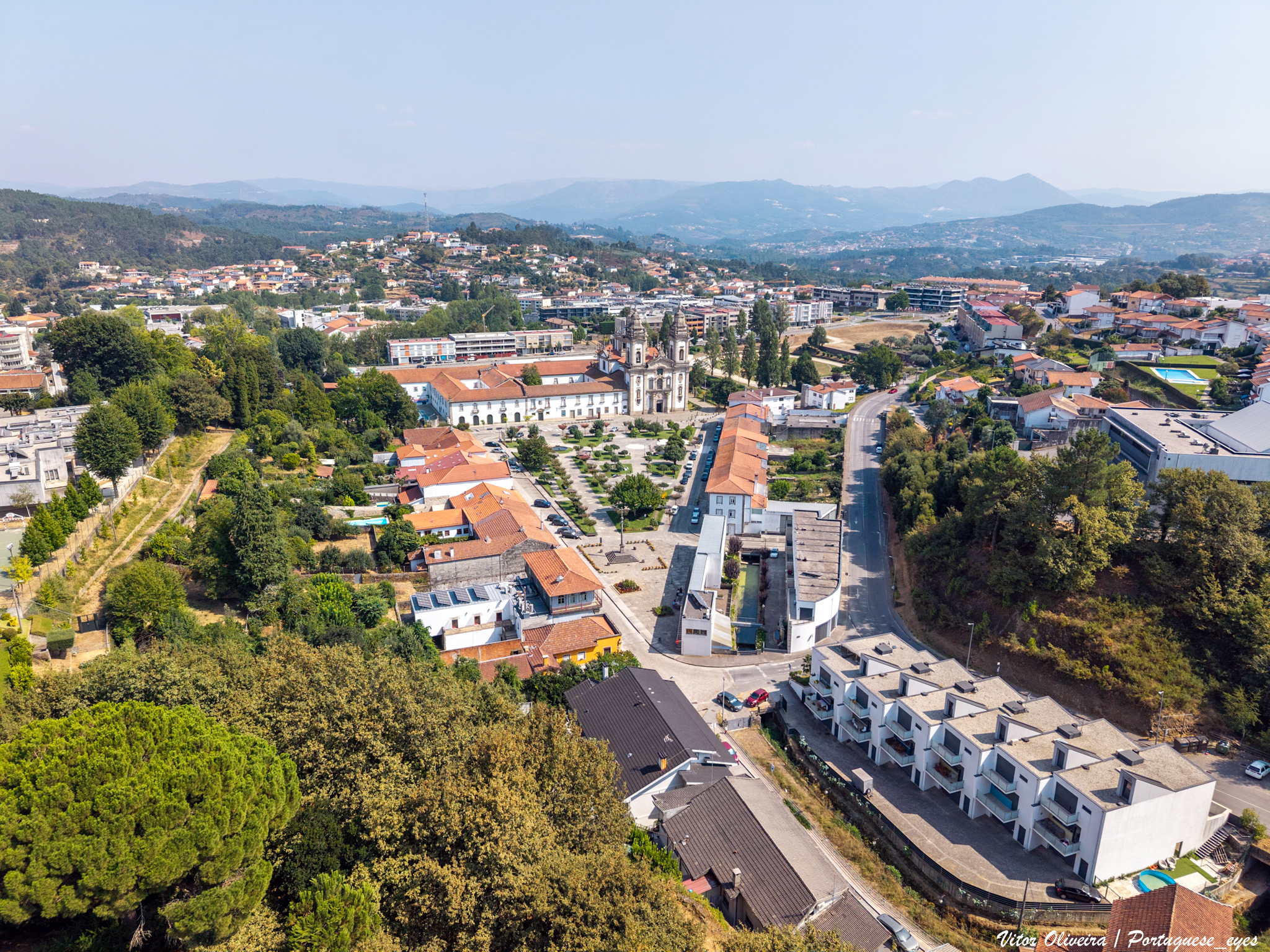
- Aerial view of Cabeceiras de Basto

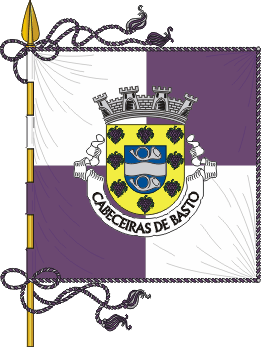
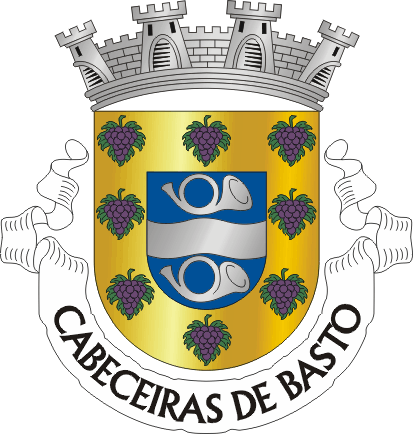
- Flag Coat of arms
- Interactive map of Cabeceiras de Basto
- Location in Portugal
- Coordinates: 41°32′N 8°01′W
- Country: Portugal
- Region: Norte
- Intermunic. comm.: Ave
- District: Braga
- Parishes: 12

Government
  - President: Francisco Alves (PS)

Area
  - Total: 241.82 km^{2} (93.37 sq mi)

Population (2011)
  - Total: 16,710
  - Density: 69.10/km^{2} (179.0/sq mi)
- Time zone: UTC+00:00 (WET)
  - Summer (DST): UTC+01:00 (WEST)
- Website: cabeceirasdebasto.pt/

Cabeceiras de Basto (Portuguese pronunciation: [kɐβɨˈsɐjɾɐʒ ðɨ ˈβaʃtu]) is a municipality in the district of Braga in Portugal. The population in 2011 was 16,710, in an area of 241.82 km².

The municipality borders the municipality of Montalegre to the north, Boticas to the northeast, Ribeira de Pena to the east, Mondim de Basto to the southeast, Celorico de Basto to the south, Fafe to the west and Vieira do Minho to the northwest.

The present mayor is Francisco Alves, elected by the Socialist Party. The municipal holiday is September 29.

== Parishes ==
Administratively, the municipality is divided into 12 civil parishes (freguesias):

- Abadim
- Alvite e Passos
- Arco de Baúlhe e Vila Nune
- Basto
- Bucos
- Cabeceiras de Basto
- Cavez
- Faia
- Gondiães e Vilar de Cunhas
- Pedraça
- Refojos de Basto, Outeiro e Painzela
- Rio Douro

== Gallery ==
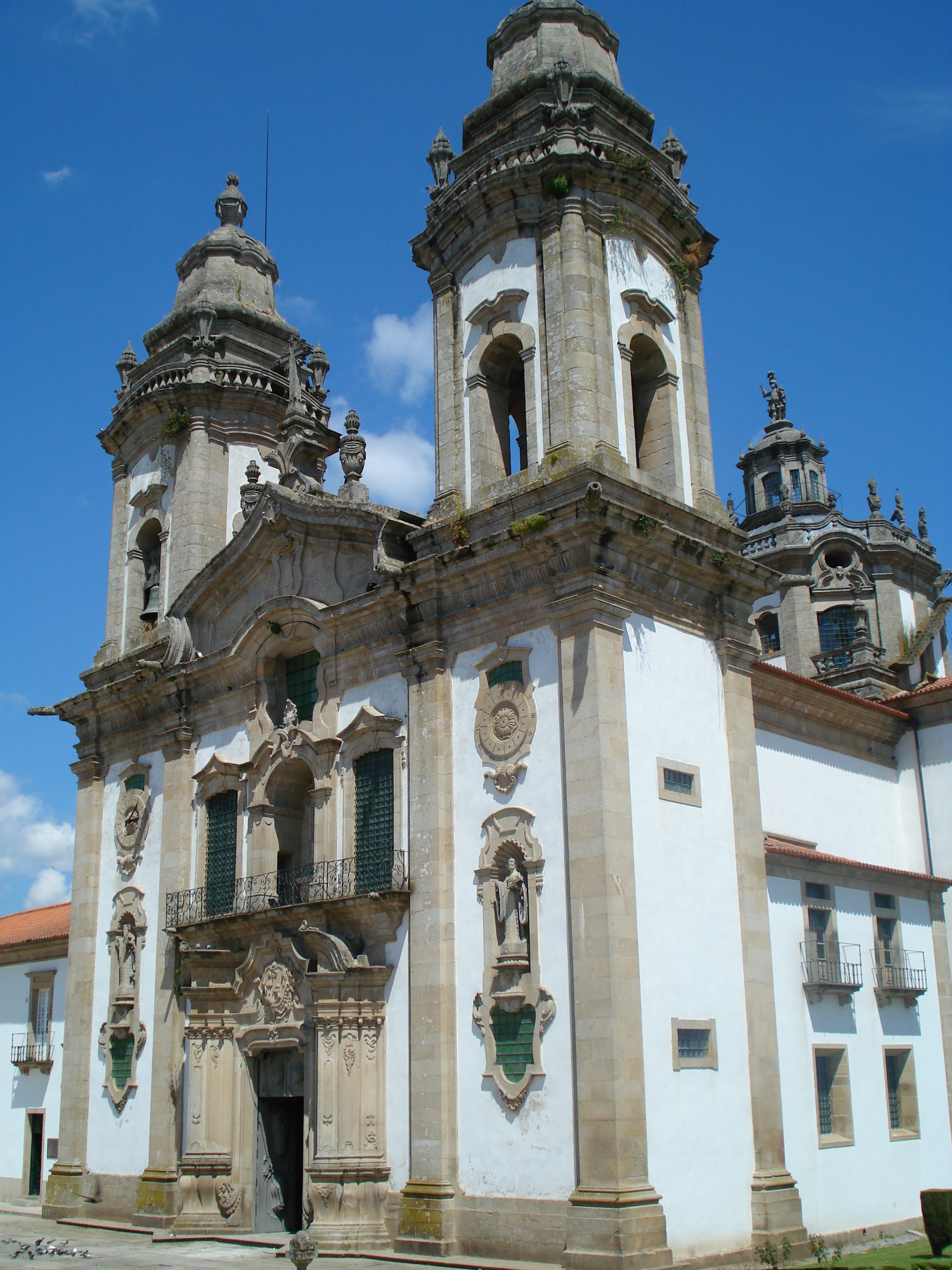
Saint Michael's Monastery

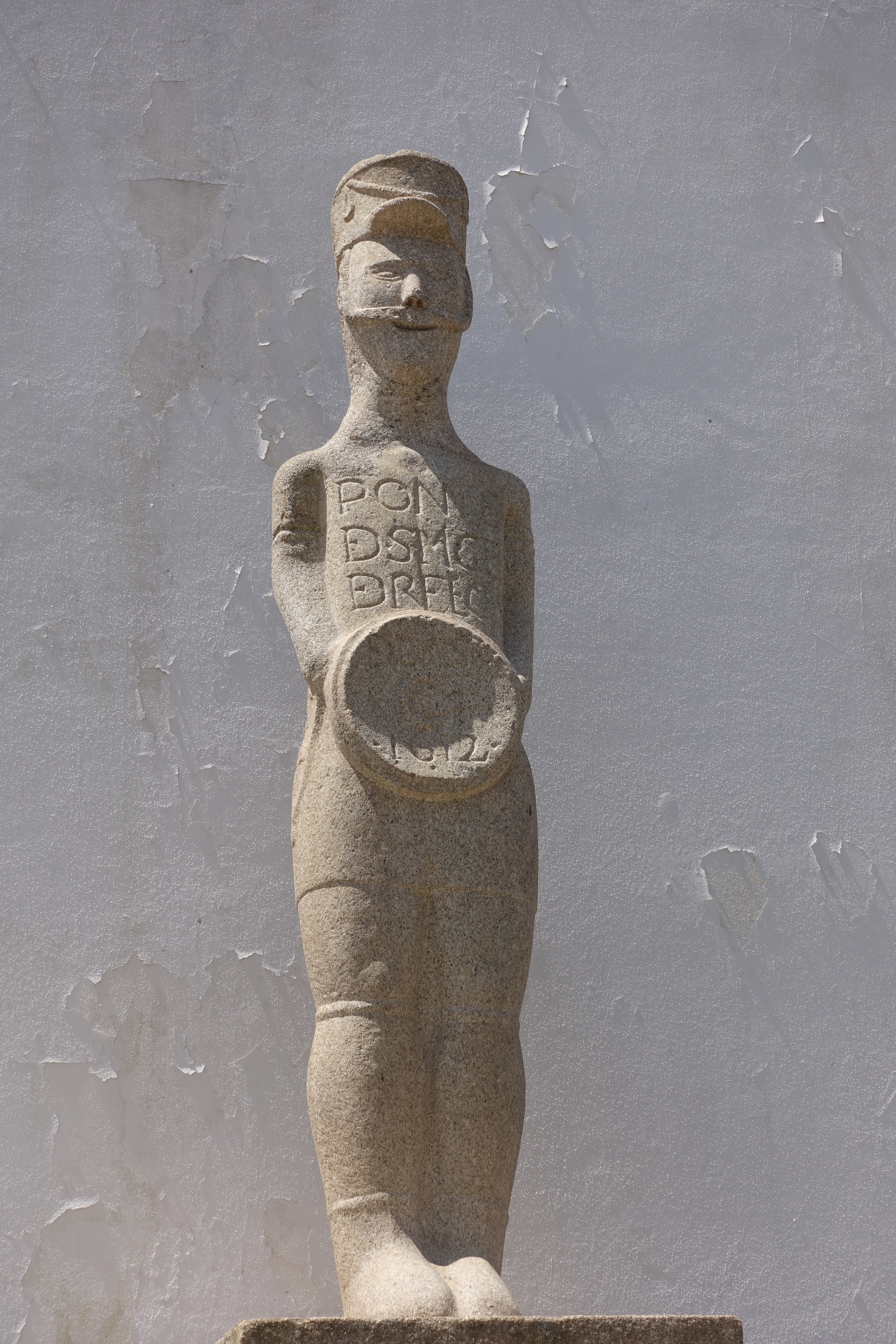
Basto's Statue

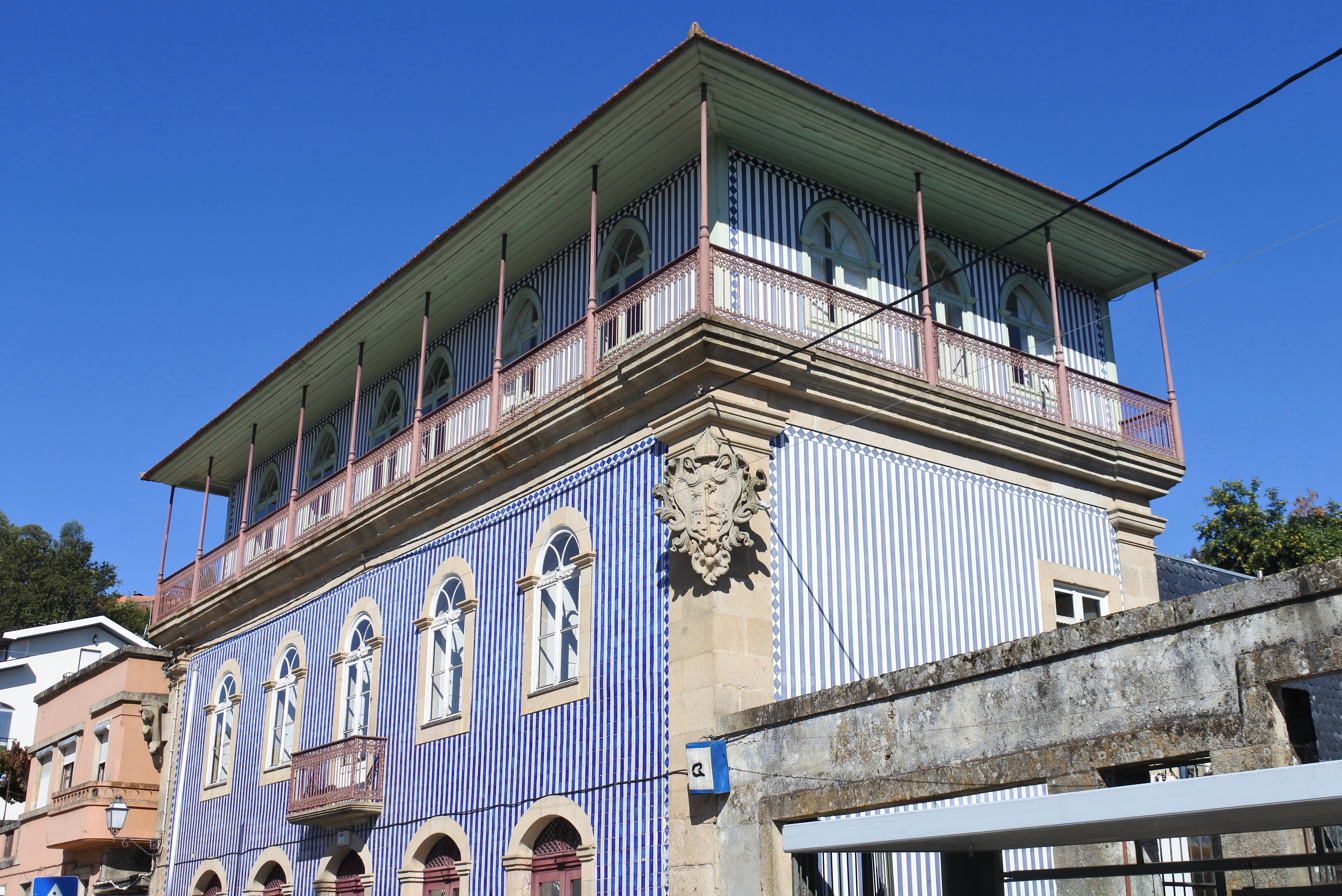
Culture House
