= Amarante, Portugal =

Amarante
- Municipality
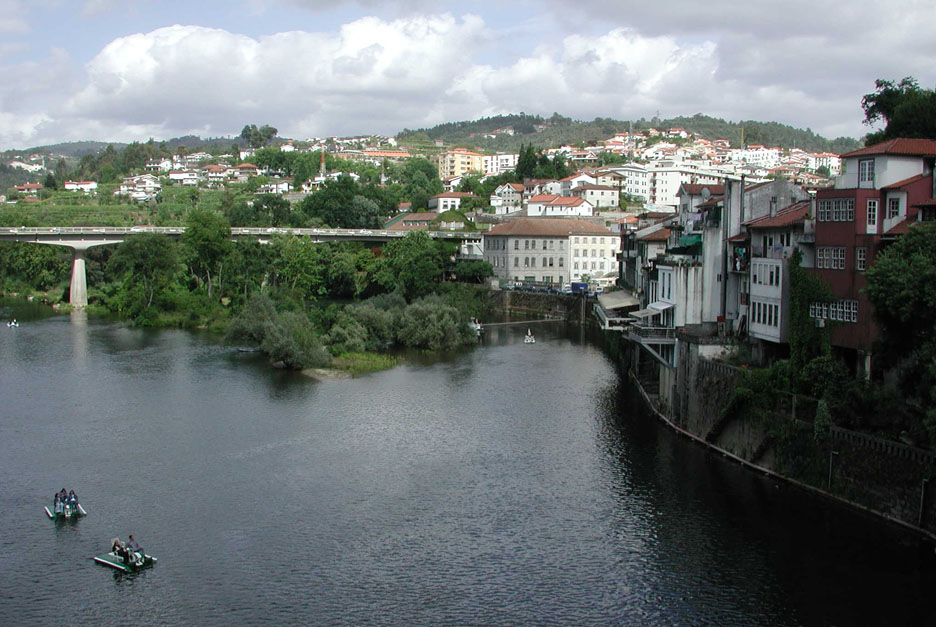
- Amarante on the bank of the Rio Tâmega.

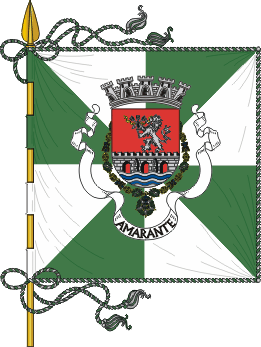
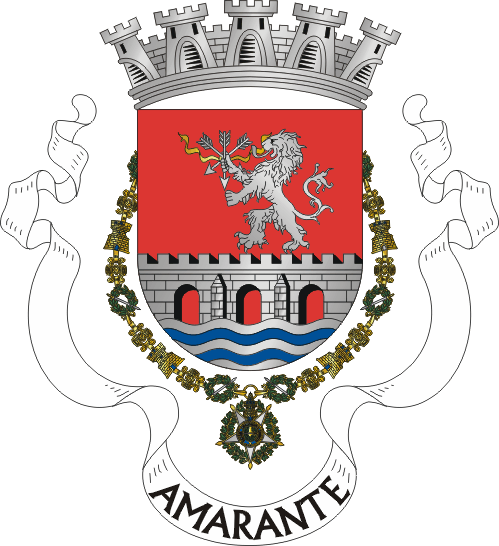
- Flag Coat of arms
- Interactive map of Amarante
- Location in Portugal
- Coordinates: 41°16′13″N 8°04′51″W
- Country: Portugal
- Region: Norte
- Intermunic. comm.: Tâmega e Sousa
- District: Porto
- Parishes: 26

Government
  - President: José Luis Gaspar (PSD)

Area
  - Total: 301.33 km^{2} (116.34 sq mi)

Population (2021)
  - Total: 52,116
  - Density: 172.95/km^{2} (447.95/sq mi)
- Time zone: UTC+00:00 (WET)
  - Summer (DST): UTC+01:00 (WEST)
- Website: http://www.cm-amarante.pt

Amarante (Portuguese pronunciation: [ɐmɐˈɾɐ̃tɨ]) is a city and municipality in the Tâmega e Sousa subregion of northern Portugal. Situated along the Tâmega River, on the western side of the Serra do Marão, it is known for its historic urban centre, religious monuments, literary and artistic heritage, and traditional gastronomy. The municipality had a population of 52,116 at the 2021 census, distributed across an area of 301.33 square kilometres (116.34 mi^{2}). The urban centre, corresponding to the civil parish of Amarante (São Gonçalo), Madalena, Cepelos and Gatão, had 11,564 inhabitants.

The settlement developed around a crossing of the Tâmega River, which connects the coastal region of Minho with the mountainous interior of northern Portugal. Its medieval development is traditionally associated with São Gonçalo de Amarante, a Dominican religious figure who settled in the area during the 13th century and is credited with promoting the construction of a bridge across the river. His veneration subsequently made Amarante an important destination for pilgrims, while the construction of the Church and Convent of São Gonçalo established a major religious and architectural landmark in the town.

Amarante played a significant role in the Peninsular War, particularly during the Battle of the Bridge of Amarante in 1809, when Portuguese forces and local inhabitants resisted the advance of French troops across the Tâmega. The town subsequently developed as a regional commercial and cultural centre. Its cultural heritage is associated with Portuguese writers and artists including Teixeira de Pascoaes, Agustina Bessa-Luís, António Carneiro and Amadeo de Souza-Cardoso. The latter is commemorated by the Museu Municipal Amadeo de Souza-Cardoso, housed in the former Dominican convent. In 2017, Amarante became a member of the UNESCO Creative Cities Network in the field of music.

== History ==
=== Iron age and Roman period ===
Human presence in the Amarante area is sparsely attested before the Iron Age, with only isolated finds. From the Iron Age onward, and more consistently during the Roman period, settlement becomes better documented. One of the main sites is the Castro de Ladário, a fortified hilltop settlement occupied from the 1st century BCE to the 5th century CE. It may have served as the main center of the Atucausenses, a local tribal group identified in a Roman inscription found nearby in Pascoaes.

Roman occupation is also evidenced at rural sites such as Pascoaes and Boavista, Cepelos, likely small farming communities (villae or vici) with water access and in proximity to regional roadways. Several Roman necropolises have been identified within the municipality, including at Misericórdia, Barral, and Ataúdes, along with rock-cut wine presses which suggests local wine production.

The area was crossed by important Roman roads connecting Bracara Augusta (Braga), Tongobriga, and Panóias, with secondary routes linking to Amarante's settlements, including Fregim, Pidre, and Padronelo. The Tâmega River, which traverses the region, could be crossed at seasonal fords, ferries, or possibly a Roman bridge. Although no definitive remains survive, it is theorized that a bridge might have existed at the site of the modern São Gonçalo Bridge, but fallen into ruin by the 6th century.

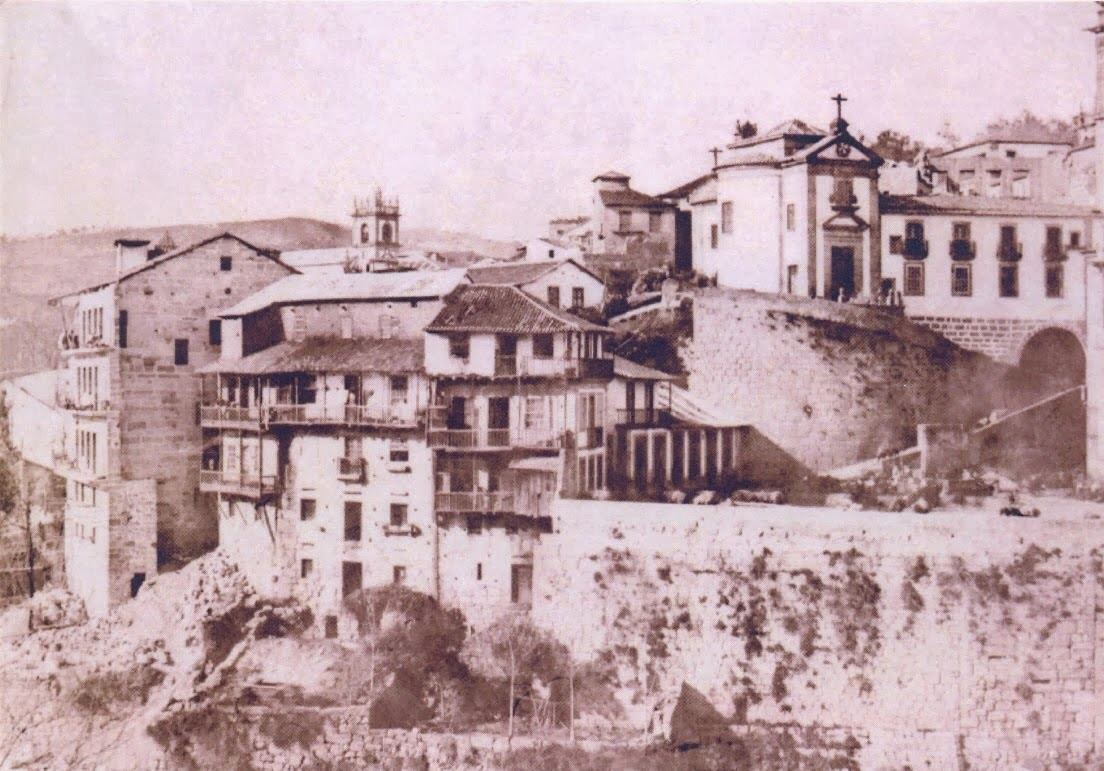
An 1850 view of the Largo de São Gonçalo

=== Middle Ages ===
The first prominent building erected during the area of Amarante was likely the Albergaria do Covelo do Tâmega sometime in the 12th century, by order of Queen Mafalda. These types of shelter were constructed in small settlements and were used by travellers, especially the poor who transited the territory. Permanent settles fixed themselves around the local churches, such as the Church of São Veríssimo and Church of Lufrei, resulting in growth during the intervening years.

Since at least the 13th century, the town and municipality of Amarante fell under the strong influence of two ecclesiastical powers: the Benedictine Monastery of Pombeiro and the Collegiate Church of Santa Maria of Guimarães. Several parishes now part of the municipality were once under Pombeiro's patronage, while the Collegiate of Guimarães maintained notable pastoral and landholding connections in Amarante and nearby Fregim. The latter's documents also refer to the parish of Telões, then home to one of only two collegiate churches in the entire Archdiocese of Braga.

The arrival of the Dominican friar Gundisalvus of Amarante to Amarante during the early 13th century marks a period of development for the town. At this time, Amarante was likely a populated area with functioning institutions and religious life, though hagiographers from the 16th and 17th century portrayed it as an isolated and wild place. Gundisalvus efforts led to the construction of a stone bridge across the Tâmega River, as well as other local structures. Following his death, Amarante became the destination of pilgrimages.

By the late 13th century, several social and religious institutions had established itself in Amarante. The city had a leprosarium considered significant enough to receive donations alongside those in major urban centers like Porto and Braga. Testamentary records from the 13th and 14th centuries frequently mention the nuns of Amarante, which might have been Cistercian or Poor Clares. By 1279, the Church of São Gonçalo de Amarante had been established and by 1305 the town had its own judges and notaries.

=== Modern era ===
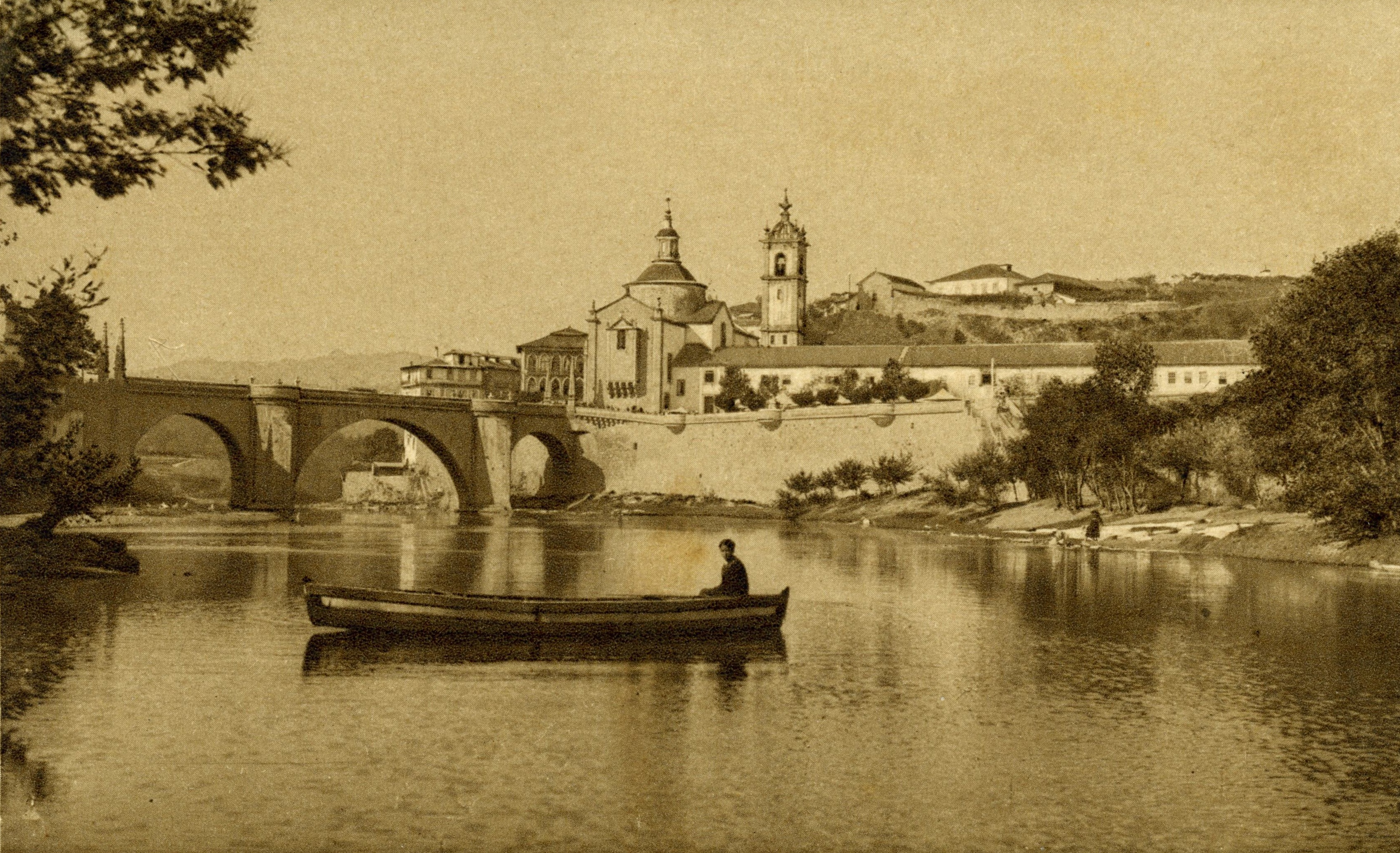
A view of the church and monastery of Amarante alongside the Tâmega River in 1910

In the 16th century, King D. John III expanded the Church of São Gonçalo de Amarante and established a large Dominican monastery around it. In 1763, a flood destroyed the medieval stone bridge over the Tâmega River and in 1790 a new São Gonçalo Bridge was built.

Amarante played a key role in the Battle of the Bridge of Amarante during the second French invasion of Portugal in 1809, part of the Peninsular War. French forces under Jean-de-Dieu Soult, commanded by Louis Henri Loison, attempted to secure a route between Porto and Spain. After pillaging and burning the villages of Vila Meã, Manhufe and Pidre, they were held at the Tâmega River by Portuguese troops led by Francisco da Silveira. For 14 days, Silveira's largely ill-equipped force, including local citizens and clergy, resisted repeated French assaults on the bridge of São Gonçalo. On 2 May by detonating explosives under cover of fog, forcing the defenders to retreat. However, Silveira regrouped and later recaptured the town, compelling the French withdrawal from the region.

The city's resistance earned it the Order of the Tower and Sword, now displayed in the town's coat of arms. Physical scars from the battle remain visible today, such as cannon damage to the Church of São Gonçalo's façade, perforated tiles in its sacristy, and marks on the bridge itself.

The municipality of Amarante, administratively, was part of the Minho Province, and abutted the municipalities of Celorico de Basto (to the north), Gestaço (in the east), Gouveia (in the south) and Santa Cruz de Riba Tâmega (in the west). With administrative reforms during the 19th century, the municipalities of Gouveia, Gestaço and Santa Cruz de Ribatâmega were extinguished, and many of the local parishes were absorbed into the Amarante. In 1836, the town of Amarante had 364 households. On 8 July 1985, Amarante became a city.

Between 1909 and 2009 Amarante was served by the Tâmega line, a narrow-gauge railway line linking it to Livração, on the Douro line. Between 1926 and 1949, the line extended beyond Amarante, reaching Celorico de Basto, Mondim de Basto and ending in Arco de Baúlhe. The section beyond Amarante was closed to all traffic in 1990, and the final section was closed on 25 March 2009, with bus replacement services continuing until the end of 2011.

== Geography ==
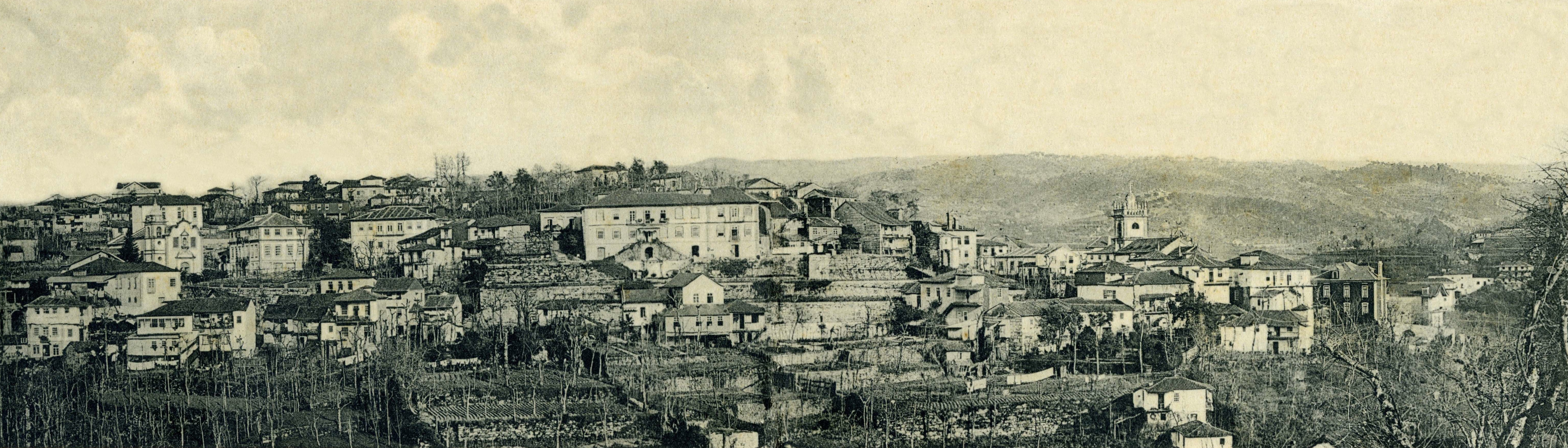
A view of the landscape of the town of Amarante in 1900

Amarante is situated in northern Portugal, within the Porto District and within the Tâmega e Sousa subregion. The municipality is bordered by the municipalities of Felgueiras, Celorico de Basto and Mondim de Basto to the north, Lousada to the west, Penafiel, Marco de Canaveses and Baião to the south and Santa Marta de Penaguião and Vila Real to the east.

The municipality is located on the western side of the Serra do Marão mountain range, close to the Aboboreira mountains section. The Tâmega River runs through the town and the municipality and is crossed by a large arched bridge, the São Gonçalo Bridge. The river is susceptible to seasonal flooding, with significant flood events recorded in 1909, 1939, 1962, and 2001.

=== Climate ===
Climate data for Amarante, altitude: 146 m (479 ft)
Month	Jan	Feb	Mar	Apr	May	Jun	Jul	Aug	Sep	Oct	Nov	Dec	Year
Average precipitation mm (inches)	162 (6.4)	148 (5.8)	117 (4.6)	96 (3.8)	91 (3.6)	51 (2.0)	17 (0.7)	20 (0.8)	59 (2.3)	120 (4.7)	146 (5.7)	170 (6.7)	1,197 (47.1)
Source: Portuguese Environment Agency

=== Parishes ===
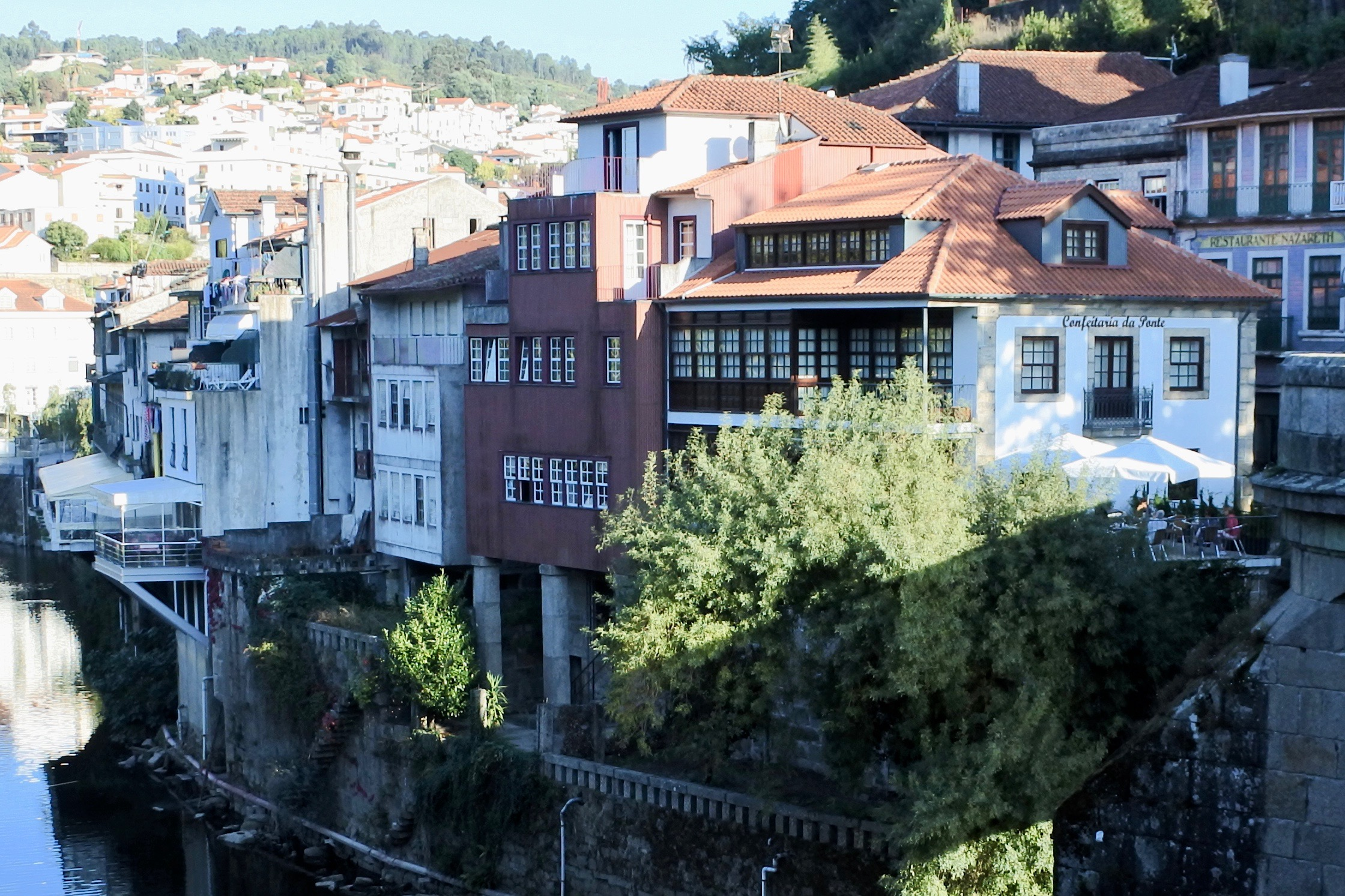
The overhang homes located in the central community of São Gonçalo, Madalena, Cepelos e Gatão

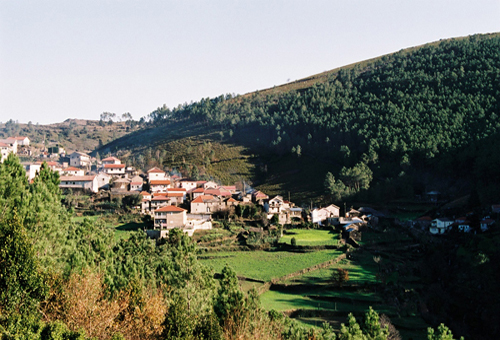
Covelo do Monte in the parish of Aboadela

Administratively, the municipality is divided into 26 civil parishes:

- Aboadela, Sanche e Várzea
- Amarante (São Gonçalo), Madalena, Cepelos e Gatão
- Ansiães
- Bustelo, Carneiro e Carvalho de Rei
- Candemil
- Figueiró (Santiago e Santa Cristina)
- Fregim
- Freixo de Cima e de Baixo
- Fridão
- Gondar
- Jazente
- Lomba
- Louredo
- Lufrei
- Mancelos
- Olo e Canadelo
- Padronelo
- Real, Ataíde e Oliveira
- Rebordelo
- Salvador do Monte
- São Simão de Gouveia
- Telões
- Travanca
- Vila Caiz
- Vila Chã do Marão
- Vila Garcia, Aboim e Chapa

== Economy ==
The municipality features the Amarante Golf Course, an 18-hole, par 68 course designed by Portuguese architect Jorge Santana da Silva. It was founded in 1997 in Quinta da Deveza in the parish of Fregim about 6 km (4 mi) from the town centre.

== Infrastructure ==
Amarante lies around half a kilometre from the A4 Motorway. There is also a bus station, served principally by Rodonorte, to the south of the Támega river.

The city has been without a railway connection since 2009, following the closure of the Tâmega line. However, the National Railway Plan, approved in 2025, proposed a new Linha de Trás-os-Montes that could restore service to the city. The planned line would connect Vila Real and Bragança to the national network and would include a station in Amarante as part of its first phase, enabling potential suburban services between Porto and Amarante. As of 2025, the project remains at the planning stage, with no confirmed timeline for construction.

Amarante features an "Ecopista" pathway for bicycles and pedestrians using a section of the former railway bed of the Tâmega line north of the city. The path runs for 39.2 km (24.4 mi), alongside the Tâmega river through a landscape of vineyards, farmland, and villages, until the northern end in Arco de Baúlhe. The path features several notable examples of railway engineering, including the Gatão Tunnel and the bridges of Santa Natália, Carvalhas, and Barreirinho.

== Architecture ==
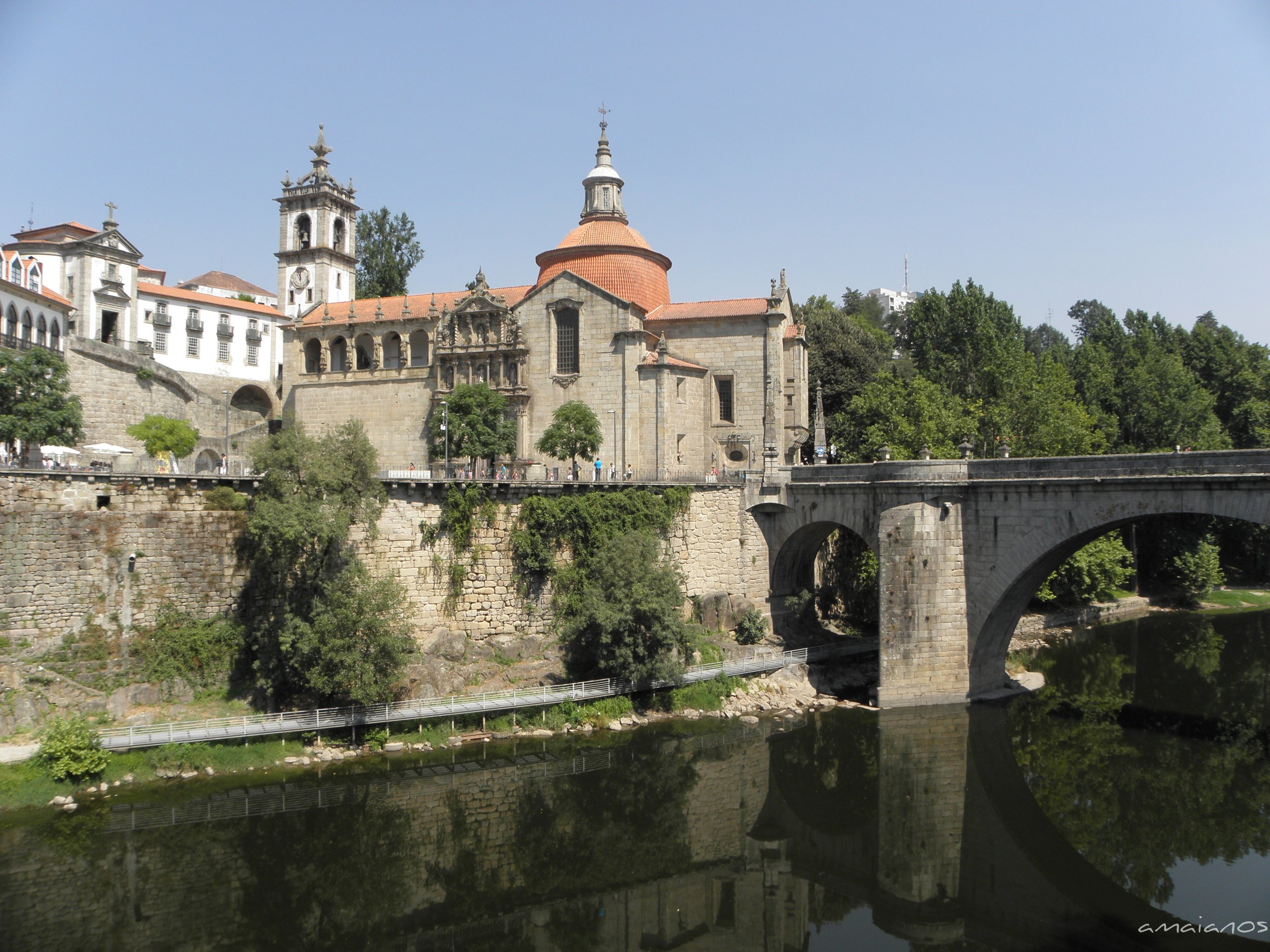
The monastery and bridges attributed and dedicated to Gonçalo de Amarante

The architecture of the Amarante region is mainly in the Romanesque style, with a number of Romanesque monuments (colonnades, arches, tympana and columns) throughout the region. They were built in deserted areas or on crossroads on the outskirts of inhabited areas, serving as meeting places, accommodation and defensive positions. Amarante became part of the Sousa Valley Romanesque Route (Rota do Românico) project on the 12 March 2010.

Important religious buildings can be found to the north of the Tâmega, and include the Travanca monastery, the Mancelos church, the Telões church, the Freixo de Baixo monastery and the Gatão church. On the southern side of the river, can be found the Jazente church, the Lufrei church and the Gondar monastery which are in a more modest style.

- Church of Salvador (Portuguese: Igreja Paroquial de Real/Igreja do Salvador/Igreja Velha)
- Church of Santa Maria (Portuguese: Igreja Paroquial de Jazente/Igreja de Santa Maria)
- Church of São João Baptista (Portuguese: Igreja Paroquial de Gatão/Igreja de São João Baptista)
- Convent of São Gonçalo de Amarante (Portuguese: Convento de São Gonçalo de Amarante/Câmara Municipal de Amarante/Museu Municipal Amadeo de Souza Cardoso)
- Monastery of Divino Salvador (Portuguese: Mosteiro do Divino Salvador/Igreja Paroquial de Freixo de Baixo/Igreja do Divino Salvador)
- Monastery of Gondar (Portuguese: Mosteiro de Gondar/Igreja de Santa Maria/Igreja Velha)
- Monastery of Lufrei (Portuguese: Mosteiro de Lufrei/Igreja Paroquial de Lufrei/Igreja do Divino Salvador)
- Monastery of Mancelos (Portuguese: Mosteiro de Mancelos/Igreja Paroquial de Mancelos/Igreja de São Martinho)
- Monastery of Telões (Portuguese: Mosteiro de Telões/Igreja Paroquial de Telões/Igreja de Santo André)
- Monastery of São Salvador de Travanca (Portuguese: Mosteiro de São Salvador de Travanca/Igreja Paroquial de Travanca/Igreja do Divino Salvador)

== Notable citizens ==
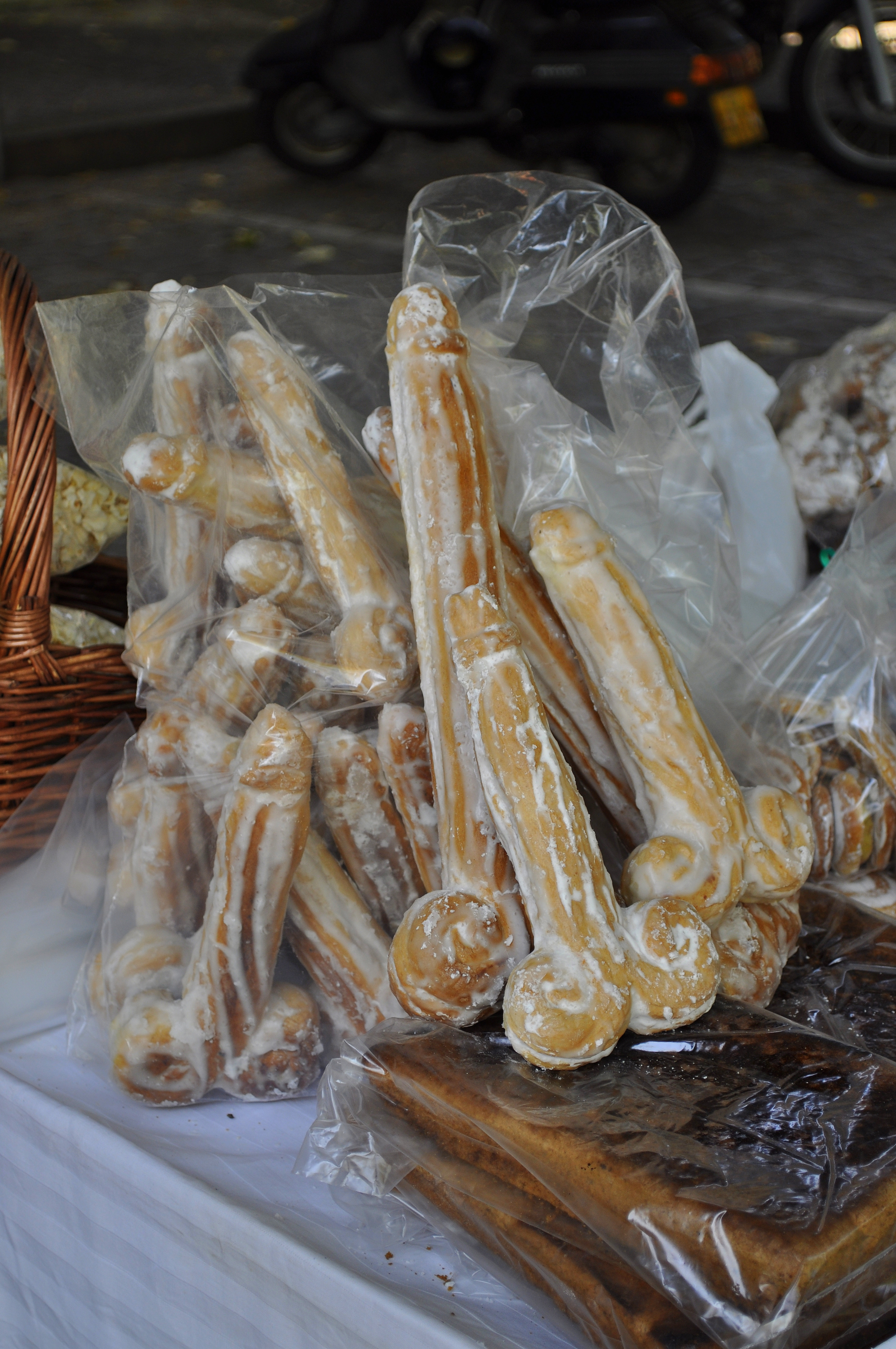
The traditional St. Gonçalo cakes named, ironically, for the Gonçalo de Amarante

- Gundisalvus of Amarante (1187 in Vizela - 1259 in Amarante), Roman Catholic priest and member of the Order of Preachers. He was canonized in 1560, and beatified in 1561
- Diogo Veloso (1558-1599) a Portuguese adventurer active in Southeast Asia
- José Guedes de Carvalho e Meneses (1814–1879) a Portuguese colonial administrator, governor general of Cape Verde & Mozambique
- António Carneiro (1872–1930) a Portuguese painter, illustrator, poet and art professor.
- Joaquim Pereira Teixeira de Vasconcelos (1877 in Amarante - 1952), a poet, pen name Teixeira de Pascoaes. He was nominated five times for the Nobel Prize in Literature.
- Artur Carlos de Barros Basto (1887–1961), soldier and writer about Judaism.
- Amadeo de Souza-Cardoso (1887–1918) a Portuguese modernist painter
- Augusto Casimiro (1889–1967) a Portuguese journalist, poet and political commentator.
- Agustina Bessa-Luís, (1922–2019) a Portuguese writer of novels
- António Marinho e Pinto (born 1950 in Vila Chã do Marão) lawyer, journalist and politician
- Francisco Assis (born 1965) a Portuguese politician, former MEP & mayor of Amarante

=== Sport ===
- Mário Delgado (born 1924) an equestrian competed at the 1960 Summer Olympics
- António José Alves Ribeiro (born 1965), known as Tozé, is a Portuguese retired footballer with 330 club caps
- António Pinto (born 1966), a retired long-distance runner, competed in four consecutive Summer Olympics (1988-2000)
- Nuno Gomes (born 1976) a former footballer with 463 club caps and 79 for Portugal
- Ricardo Carvalho (born 1978) a retired footballer with 433 club caps and 89 for Portugal

== International Relations ==
=== Twin towns — Sister cities ===
Amarante is twinned with:

- Achères, France (1997)
- Wiesloch, Germany (2003)

Amarante was previously twinned in 1985 with Châteauneuf-sur-Loire, France, but this relationship is dormant as of 2025.
