= Mondim de Basto =

- Municipality
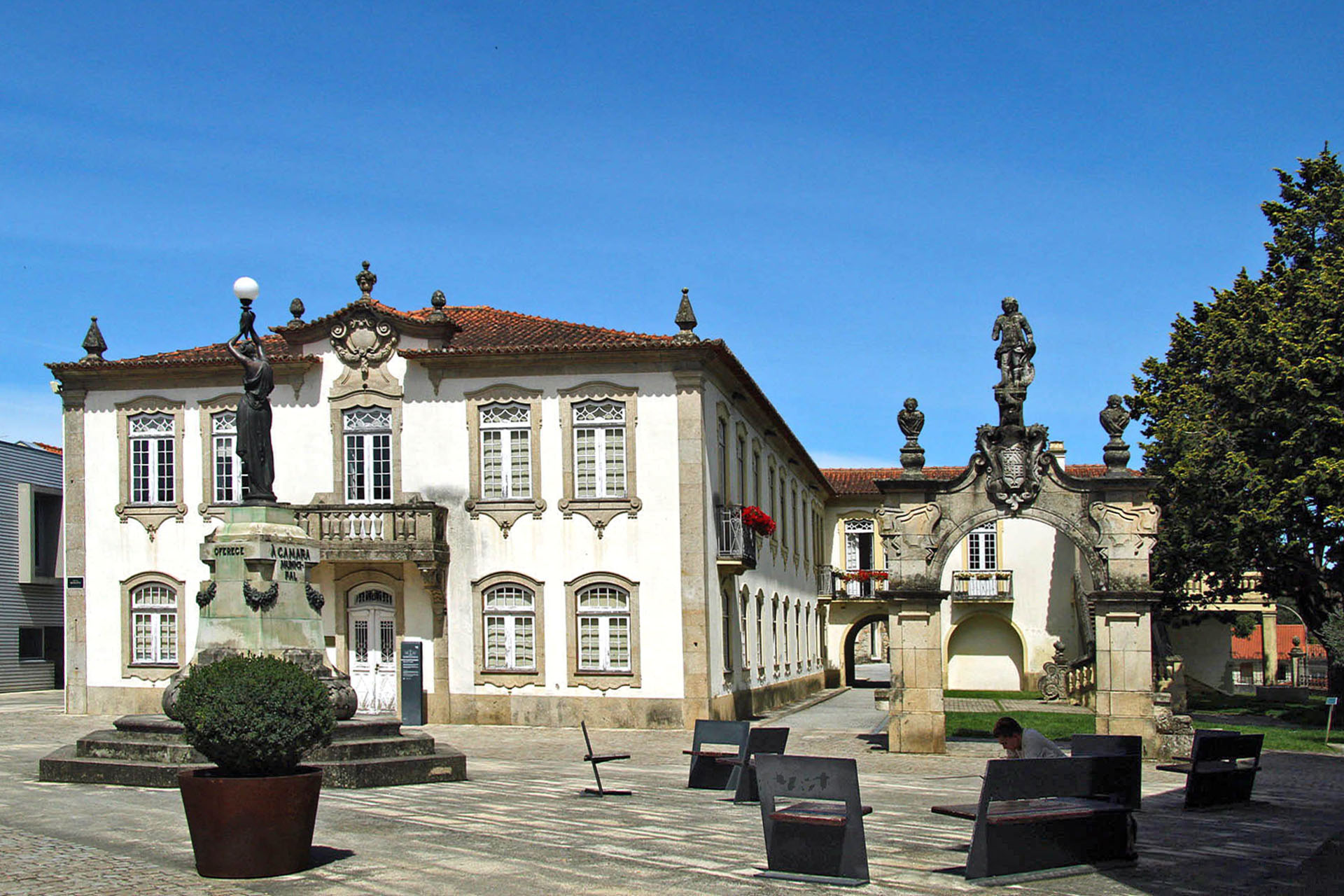

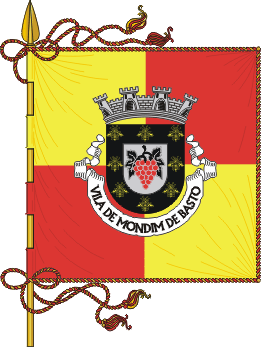
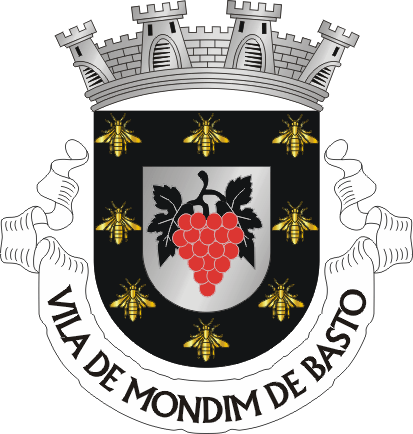
- Flag Coat of arms
- Interactive map of Mondim de Basto
- Coordinates: 41°24′N 7°57′W
- Country: Portugal
- Region: Norte
- Intermunic. comm.: Ave
- District: Vila Real
- Parishes: 6

Government
  - President: Bruno Ferreira (PSD)

Area
  - Total: 172.08 km^{2} (66.44 sq mi)

Population (2021)
  - Total: 6,410
  - Density: 37.3/km^{2} (96.5/sq mi)
- Time zone: UTC+00:00 (WET)
  - Summer (DST): UTC+01:00 (WEST)
- Website: www.cm-mondimdebasto.pt

Mondim de Basto (European Portuguese pronunciation: [mõˈdĩ dɨ ˈβaʃtu]) is a town and a municipality in the Vila Real district in northern Portugal. The municipality covers an area of 172.08 square kilometres (66.44 mi^{2}) and had a population of 6,410 in 2021, of whom 2,971 lived in the central parish of Mondim de Basto, where the town is located. The present mayor is Bruno Ferreira, elected by the PSD Party and the municipal holiday is July 25.

== History ==
Human occupation in the municipality of Mondim de Basto dates back at least to the Iron Age, around the 4th and 2nd centuries BCE, as evidenced by the archaeological site of Crastoeiro. In the 2nd century BCE, Roman legions under the consul Decimus Junius Brutus conquered the region and established the town of Maranus in the parish of Ermelo. Escavations at Crastoeiro revealed some of the earliest recorded rye in the Iberian Peninsula, suggesting that it was introduced during the initial contacts with the Romans. The site at Crastoeiro was abandoned by the 1st century CE.

In 1196, Ermelo received a foral (royal charter) from Sancho I, later renewed by Manuel I in 1514.

During the medieval period, Mondim de Basto was part of a road network linking it to Ermelo and to Vila Real in the east and to Atei and Cerva to the north and Celorico de Basto to the west. Archaeological and documentary evidence suggests the existence of a medieval bridge over the Tâmega River in Mondim de Basto, mentioned in a testament from 1282.

Mondim de Basto lay along a variant of the Camino de Santiago, known as the Caminho das Terras de Basto, connecting Vila Real to the town. While historical records indicate that the route saw relatively few pilgrims compared to other northern routes, it was still a notable passage for pilgrims traveling from Panóias Sanctuary and other inland settlements in Trás-os-Montes. In the 15th century, the Bohemian baron Jaroslav Lev of Rožmitál is recorded to have passed through the region en route to Santiago de Compostela.

During the 18th century, Mondim de Basto developed a tanning and leather industry, supplying the rest of the country with leather and shoes. In 1811, Mondim de Basto was occupied and plundered by French troops during the Peninsular War, with skirmishes reported on 11 January. In 1882, a new bridge over the Tâmega was inaugurated, replacing the old bridge of Mondim.

== Parishes ==
Administratively, the municipality is divided into 6 civil parishes (freguesias):

- Atei
- Bilhó
- Campanhó e Paradança
- Ermelo e Pardelhas
- Mondim de Basto
- Vilar de Ferreiros

== Attractions ==
Part of the Alvão Natural Park lies within the east of Mondim de Basto municipality, encompassing areas of the parishes of Ermelo e Pardelhas and Bilhó. It covers an area of 7,220 hectares (17,800 acres) at the transition between the Alvão and Marão mountain ranges. It includes part of the drainage basin of the Olo river, a tributary of the Tâmega and important habitats for various species.

== Sports ==
The Municipal Stadium of Mondim de Basto is managed and maintained by Mondinense F.C., the town's main football team, following a 1982 municipal decision. The facility is available for use by other individuals or organizations.

== Infrastructure ==
From 1949 to 1990, Mondim de Basto was serviced by the Tâmega line, a metre-gauge railway linking the town to Amarante, Celorico de Basto, Arco de Baúlhe, and the wider Portuguese rail network. The Mondim de Basto station was located about 3 kilometres (1.9 mi) west of the town center, on the right bank of the Tâmega River in Celorico de Basto municipality.
