= Santiago de Figueiró =

- Civil parish
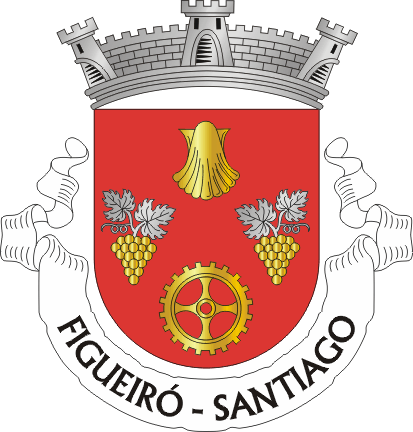
- Coat of arms

- Coordinates: 41°18′12″N 8°8′51″W
- Country: Portugal
- Region: Norte
- Intermunic. comm.: Tâmega e Sousa
- District: Porto
- Municipality: Amarante

Area
  - Total: 4.07 km^{2} (1.57 sq mi)

Population (2001)
  - Total: 2,986
  - Density: 730/km^{2} (1,900/sq mi)
- Time zone: UTC+00:00 (WET)
  - Summer (DST): UTC+01:00 (WEST)

Santiago de Figueiró is a former civil parish, located in the municipality of Amarante, Portugal. In 2013, the parish merged into the new parish Figueiró (Santiago e Santa Cristina).
