= Teixeira de Pascoaes =

Portuguese poet (1877–1952)

Texeira de Pascoaes
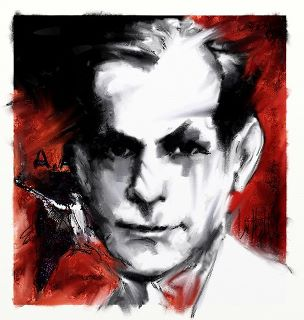
- Born: Joaquim Pereira Teixeira de Vasconcelos; 2 November 1877; Amarante Municipality, Portugal
- Died: 14 December 1952 (aged 75); Gatão, Portugal
- Occupation: Poet

Joaquim Pereira Teixeira de Vasconcelos (2 November 1877, Amarante Municipality, Portugal - 14 December 1952, Gatão, Portugal), better known by his pen name Teixeira de Pascoaes, was a Portuguese poet. He was nominated five times for the Nobel Prize in Literature.

== Life ==
Teixeira de Pascoaes was the second son (of seven) of João Pereira Teixeira de Vasconcelos, a judge and deputy to the Courts, and of Carlota Guedes Monteiro. He was a solitary, introverted and sensitive child, very prone to the contemplation of Nature.

In 1883, he began his primary studies in Amarante, and in 1887, he entered the Lyceum. In 1895, he moved to Coimbra, where he completed his secondary studies; in Amarante he was not a good student, even failing in Portuguese; and in 1896, he enrolled in the Law course of the Faculty of Law of the University of Coimbra. Unlike most of his comrades, he was not part of the Bohemian Coimbra, spending his time, monastically, in the bedroom, reading, writing and reflecting.

In 1901, he reluctantly established himself as a lawyer, first in Amarante and, from 1906, in Porto. In 1911 he was appointed substitute judge in Amarante, a position that he held for two years. In 1913, with relief, he terminated his judicial career. On those painful years he would say, "I was a Dr. Joaquim in everyone's mouth, I needed to honor the title."

Being a wealthy landowner, he took up residence in the family manor in São João do Gatão, near Amarante, with his mother and other members of his family. He dedicated himself to the management of properties, to the tireless contemplation of nature and his beloved Serra do Marão, to reading and especially to writing.

Gatão became a place of pilgrimage of countless intellectuals and artists, national and foreign, who would visit him frequently. At the end of his life, he would be friends with the poets Eugénio de Andrade and Mário Cesariny de Vasconcelos. The latter would elect him as a poet superior to Fernando Pessoa, and organized reprinting of some of the Pascoal texts, as well as a poetic anthology, in the 1970s and 1980s.

Pascoal died at 75 years old, in Gatão, in 1952.

== List of first edition poetic works ==
- Embryões (Porto, 1895)
- Bello (Coimbra, 1896 and 1897)
- Sempre (Coimbra, 1898)
- À Minha Alma (Coimbra, 1898)
- Terra Prohibida (Coimbra, 1899)
- Profecia, por dois Poetas (in collaboration with Af. Lopes Vieira—Coimbra, 1901)
- À Ventura (Coimbra, 1901)
- Jesus e Pan (Porto, 1903)
- Para a Luz (Porto, 1904)
- Vida Ethérea (Coimbra, 1906)
- As Sombras (Lisbon, 1907)
- Senhora da Noite (Porto, 1909)
- Marános (Porto, 1912)
- Regresso ao Paraíso (Porto, 1912)
- Elegias (Porto, 1912)
- O Doido e a Morte (Porto, 1913)
- Verbo Escuro (Porto, 1914)
- Miss Cavell (Porto, 1915)
- Elegia da Solidão (Amarante, 1920)
- Cantos Indecisos (Lisbon-Coimbra, 1921)
- Elegia do Amor (Lisbon, 1924)
- Sonetos (Lisbon, 1925)
- Londres (Lisbon, 1925)
- D. Carlos (Lisbon, 1925)
- Cânticos (Lisbon, 1925)
- Painel (Lisbon, 1935)
- Versos Pobres (Porto, 1949)
- Calvário (Soneto inédito—Porto, 1951)
- Últimos Versos (Lisbon, 1953)
