= São Gonçalo Monopteros =

- Monóptero de São Gonçalo
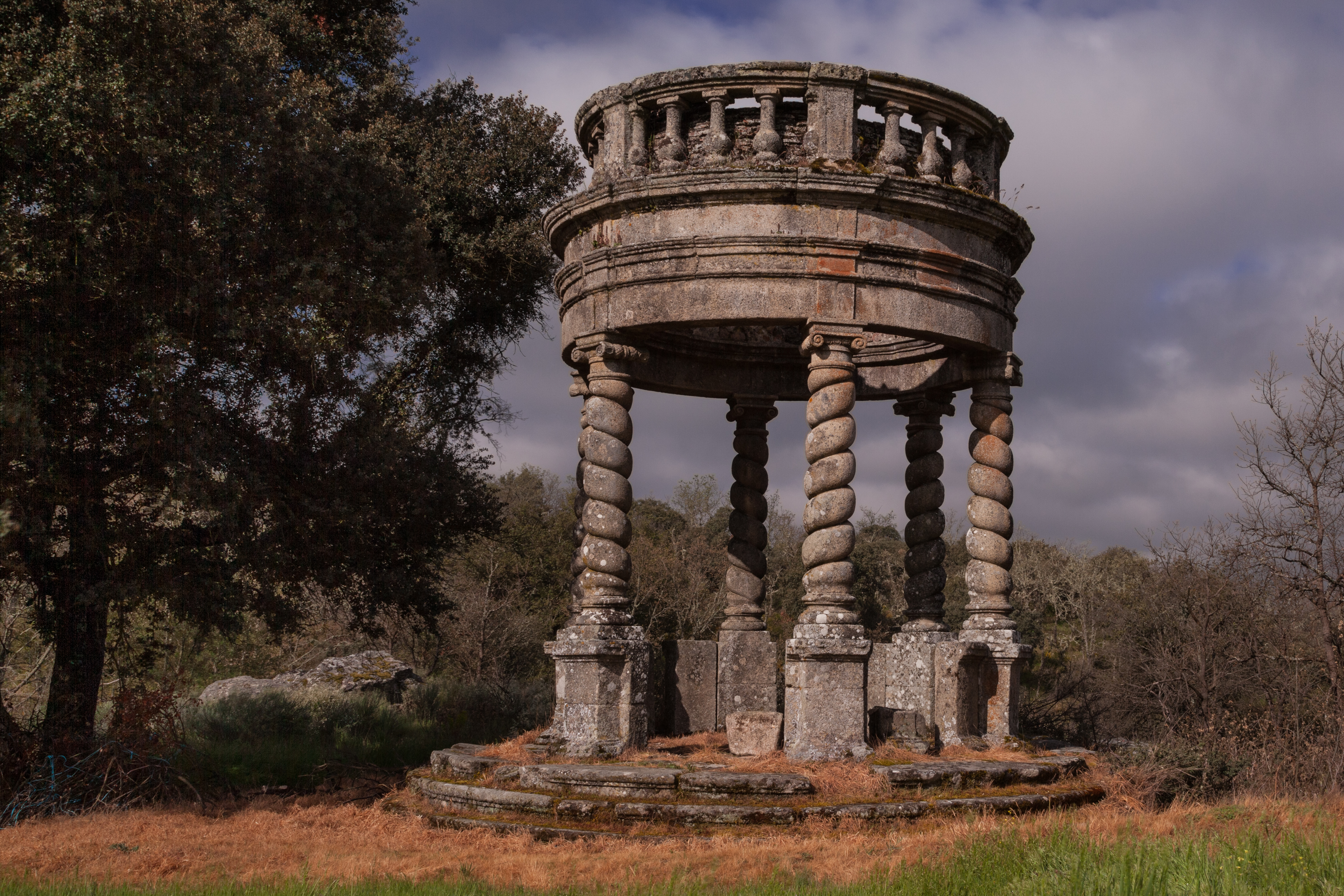
- São Gonçalo Monopteros
- Interactive map of São Gonçalo Monopteros
- Location: Penas Róias, Mogadouro, Portugal
- Coordinates: 41°21′57.5″N 6°39′09.1″W
- Type: Monopteros
- Material: Granite, brick, mortar
- Completion date: 18th century
- Dedicated to: Gundisalvus of Amarante
- Style: Baroque

The São Gonçalo Monopteros (Monóptero de São Gonçalo) is an 18th-century monopteros and a cultural heritage monument in Penas Róias, Mogadouro, Portugal. The Baroque-style structure built to house the image of Gonçalo de Amarante is a rare example of this type of architecture in Portugal.

It is a circular plan construction, with six 190 cm (75 in) Solomonic columns based on plinths and topped by Ionian capitals. A balustrade is raised above the entablature and the cover is made by a semi-spherical dome.

The monopter was built in the same place where a hermitage, built in 1571, once dedicated to São Gonçalo existed. In 1720, this chapel was already quite ruined and the chancel would be used as a place for collecting cattle. It was around that time that the monopter was erected to house the image of the saint.
