= Gonçalo de Amarante =

Portuguese Catholic saint (1187–1259)

Blessed Gundisalvus of Amarante OP
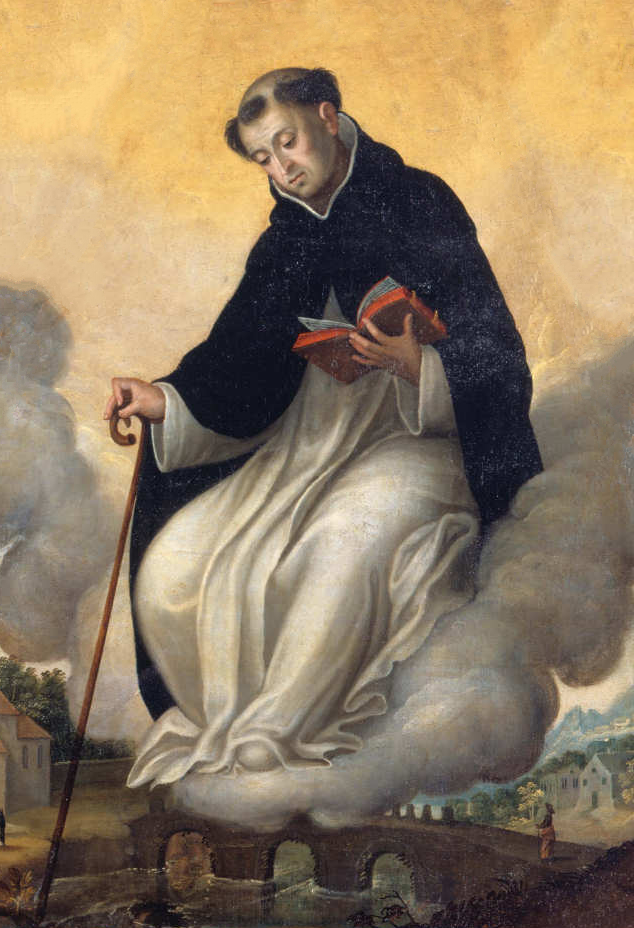
- Born: 1187; Arriconha, Tagilde, Vizela, Portugal
- Died: 10 January 1259 (aged 71); Amarante, Portugal
- Venerated in: Catholic Church
- Beatified: 16 September 1561, Saint Peter's Basilica, Papal States by Pope Pius IV
- Feast: 10 January
- Attributes: Dominican habit; Holding a ball; Light shining on him
- Patronage: Amarante; Itapissuma; Cajari; Matinha; Viana

Gundisalvus of Amarante, OP (Portuguese: Gonçalo de Amarante; 1187 – 10 January 1259) was a Portuguese Catholic priest in the Order of Preachers. He joined the order as a hermit after his return from a long pilgrimage that took him to both Rome and Jerusalem. Pope Pius IV beatified him in 1561.

== Life ==
Gundisalvus was born in 1187 in Portugal to nobles. It was said at his baptism he fixed his intense gaze upon the crucifix as he was being carried to the baptismal font. He was devoted to Jesus Christ in his childhood and decided to become a priest. The Archbishop of Braga ordained Gundisalvus and the latter distributed his great wealth to his nephews. Gundisalvus worked in the parish of Saint Paio de Vizela and obtained leave so as to go to visit Rome and Jerusalem while leaving his nephew, also a priest, in charge of the parish. It was held that he returned from the pilgrimage after just over a decade.

Gundisalvus visited the tombs of Saint Peter and Saint Paul before going to Jerusalem via ship. He returned to find that austere measures he now upheld in his life were something that his nephew did not welcome and who set a dog upon him while viewing him as nothing more than a vagrant. Discernment led Gundisalvus to the Dominicans, the order into which he was admitted and he was allowed to live as a hermit who was in the service of his local people. He built a bridge himself over the Tâmega River.

According to legend, the workers who helped build the bridge once ran out of wine leading him to smack a rock with his stick causing it to split open with wine pouring out of it. On another occasion the workers ran out of food and he went to the water and called out promoting fish to jump onto the river bank providing the workers with food.

== Beatification ==
Gundisalvus died in 1259. Pius IV beatified him on 16 September 1561, his feast day being celebrated on 10 January, the day of his death.
