= Figueiró (Santiago e Santa Cristina) =

- Civil parish
- Location in Portugal
- Coordinates: 41.30°N 8.16°W
- Country: Portugal
- Region: Norte
- Intermunic. comm.: Tâmega e Sousa
- District: Porto
- Municipality: Amarante

Area
  - Total: 8.11 km^{2} (3.13 sq mi)

Population (2011)
  - Total: 3,828
  - Density: 472/km^{2} (1,220/sq mi)
- Time zone: UTC+00:00 (WET)
  - Summer (DST): UTC+01:00 (WEST)

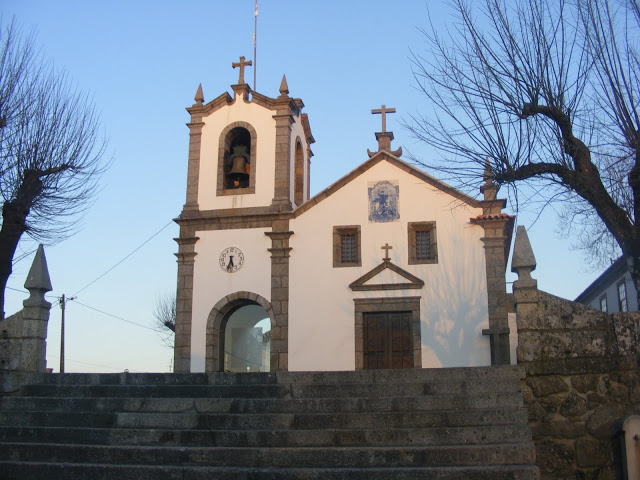
Amarante Figueiró Santa Cristina Church

Figueiró (Santiago e Santa Cristina) is a civil parish in the municipality of Amarante, Portugal. It was formed in 2013 by the merger of the former parishes Santiago de Figueiró and Santa Cristina de Figueiró. The population in 2011 was 3,828, in an area of 8.11 km^{2} (3.13 sq mi).
