= Tâmega (river) =

River in northern Portugal and Galicia

Coordinates: 41.082°N 8.293°W

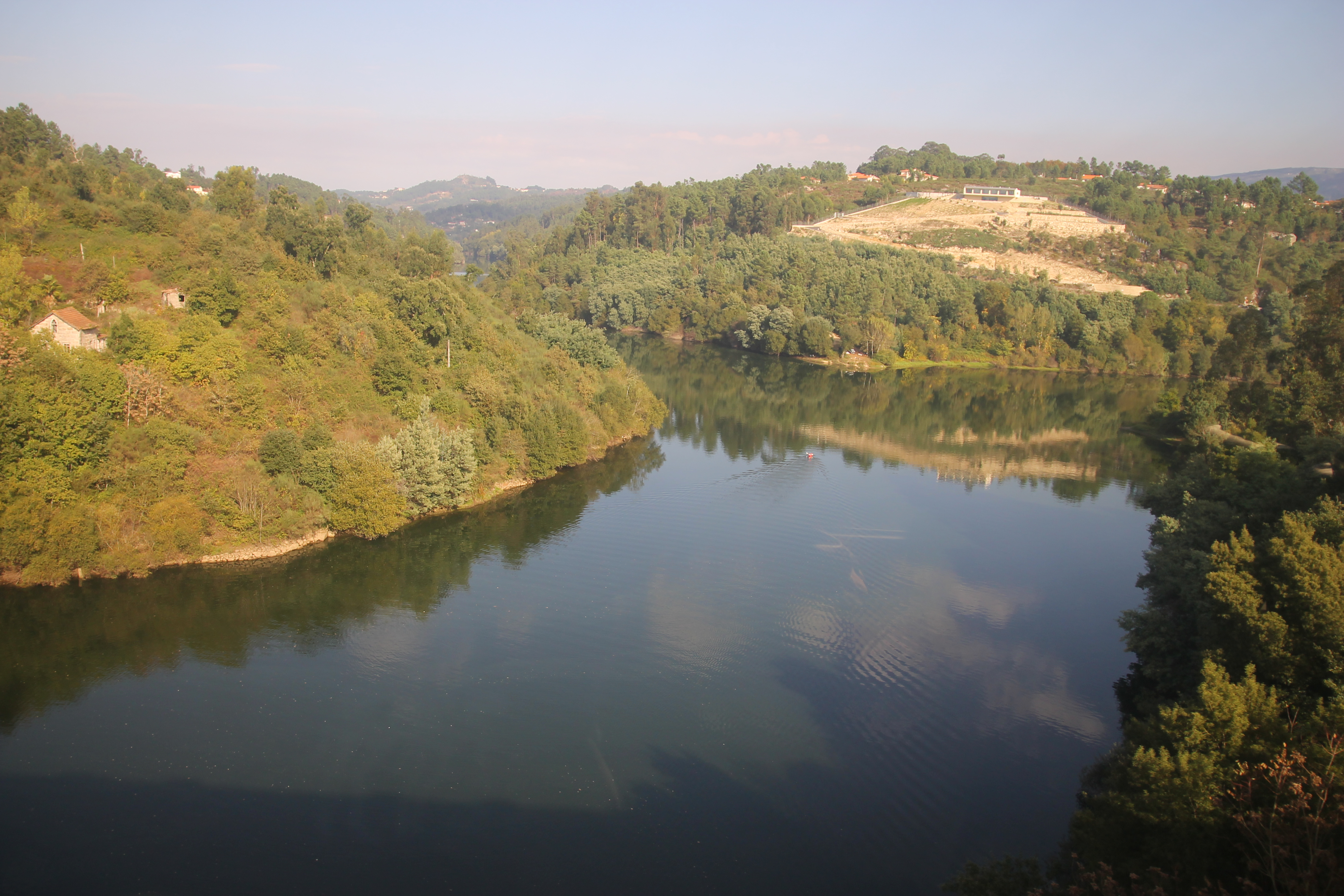
- The river flowing through Marco de Canaveses

Location
- Country: Spain, Portugal

Physical characteristics
- Mouth: Douro
  - location: Entre-os-Rios, Penafiel
- Basin size: 3,309 km^{2} (1,278 sq mi)
- Discharge
  - average: 70.3 m^{3}/s (2,480 cu ft/s)

The Tâmega (European Portuguese: [ˈtɐmɨɣɐ]) or Támega (Galician: [ˈtamɪɣɐ]; Proto-Celtic: *Tamaca) is a river in the Iberian Peninsula and a tributary of the Douro River. It has a length of 145 kilometers (51.91 km in Spain) and originates at the "Fuente del Támega" in the locality of A Alberguería (Laza), in the foothills of the Sierra de San Mamede, at an elevation of 960 meters on Mount Talariño. It passes through the districts of Vila Real, Braga and Porto before joining the Douro near Entre-os-Rios.

From Verín, it flows to the Portuguese city of Chaves and thereafter through the Veiga de Chaves, an extensive structural valley, now seismically inactive, with 2,500 hectares (6,200 acres). Then it winds through narrow mountain gorges and valleys as it flows past Ribeira de Pena and the cities of Amarante and Marco de Canaveses. Along its course, it receives tributaries such as the Odres and Ovelha rivers. The river’s course covers a basin of approximately 3,309 square kilometres (1,278 mi^{2}), with an average annual flow of 70.3 m^{3}/s (2,480 cu ft/s).

With the exception of the water reservoir of the Torrão Dam, the Tâmega is not navigable, owing to its variable flow and a series of small dams. In Marco de Canaveses, riverside parks such as the Parque Fluvial do Tâmega and the Parque de Lazer de Alpendorada e Matos provide facilities for water sports and recreation, including canoeing, kayaking, pedal boating, and river cruises.

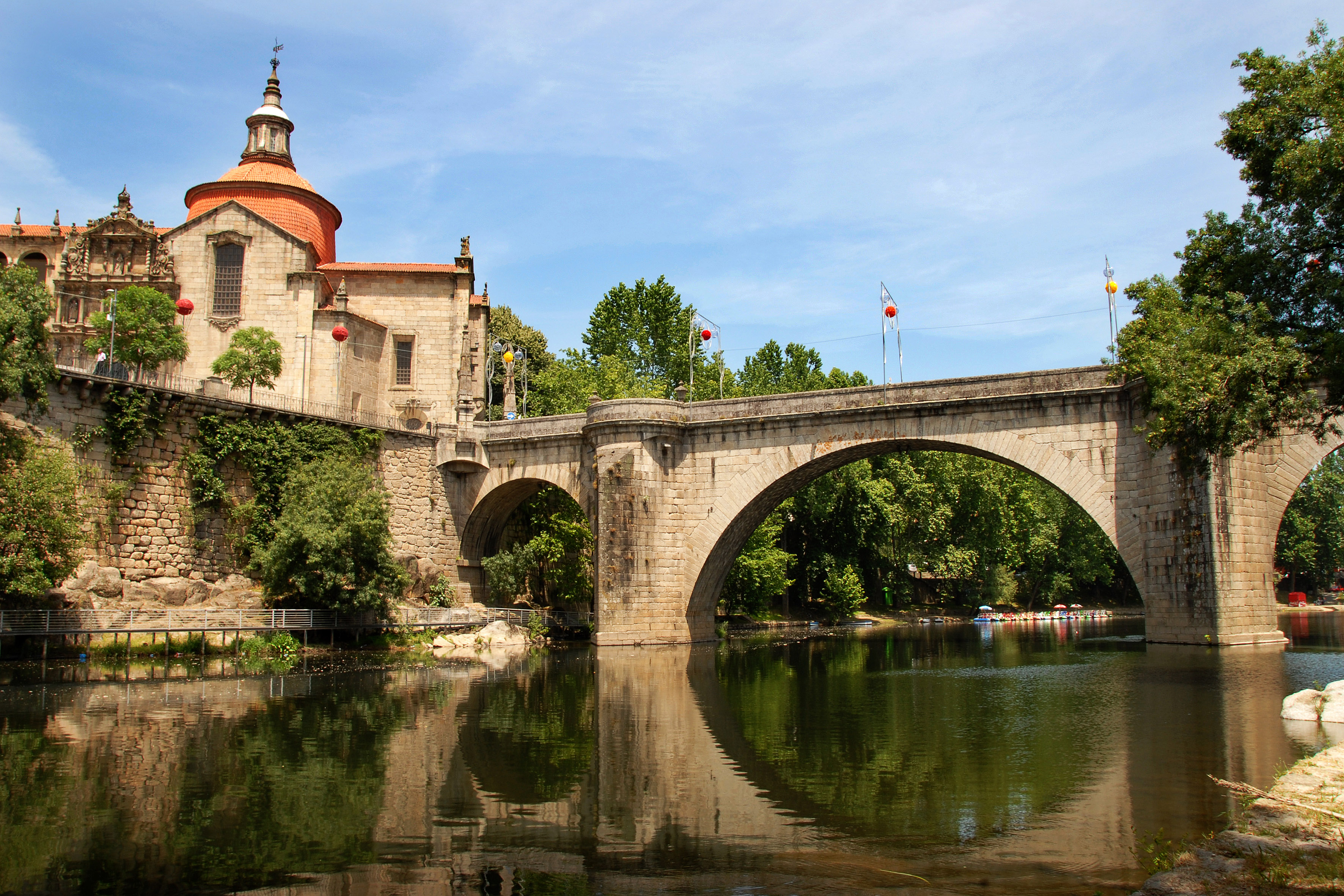
São Gonçalo bridge in Amarante

In the second half of the 20th century, the Tâmega River in Amarante suffered severe environmental degradation due to untreated wastewater, industrial discharges, and sand extraction. These issues led to a noticeable decline in water quality, with sections of the river becoming unsuitable for bathing and other recreational activities. The situation began to improve towards the end of the century as public awareness grew and environmental measures were implemented, including the construction of wastewater treatment facilities and restrictions on sand extraction. The opening of the Torrão Dam in 1989 also spurred local civic and ecological movements, such as Amigo do Rio (Friend of the River), which campaigned for riverbank rehabilitation and greater protection of the river’s ecological flow.

The Tâmega is also prone to seasonal flooding, particularly in the city of Amarante, which spans both banks of the river. Hydrological studies and national water management plans have identified Amarante as a flood risk area, with major flood events recorded in 1909, 1939, 1962, and 2001.

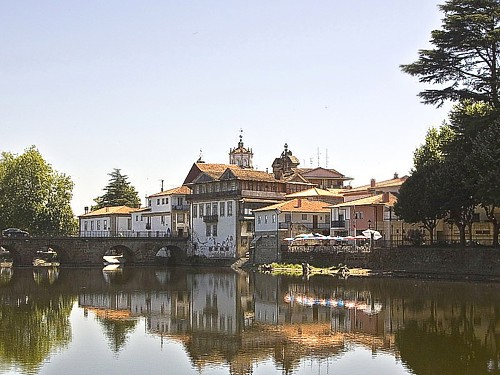
The Tâmega in Chaves

In 2022 a dam was inaugurated, located between the city of Amarante and the town of Mondim de Basto. It cost €1.5 billion and featured a 220 MW pumped-storage hydroelectricity facility, storing 40 GWh of electricity. Three more turbines are scheduled for the site, bringing the storage power to 880 MW. The project also includes two run-of-the-river hydroelectricity facilities. Besides producing electricity, the project featured a flood control system, diverting the waterflow towards the smaller Olo River.

== Transport ==
The Tâmega line, which closed in 2009, was a narrow gauge railway line which closely followed the river.

== See also ==
- List of rivers of Portugal
- List of rivers of Spain
- Rivers of Galicia
