= Panoias Sanctuary =

Cultural heritage monument in Vila Real, Portugal

- Santuário de Panóias
- Panoias Sanctuary
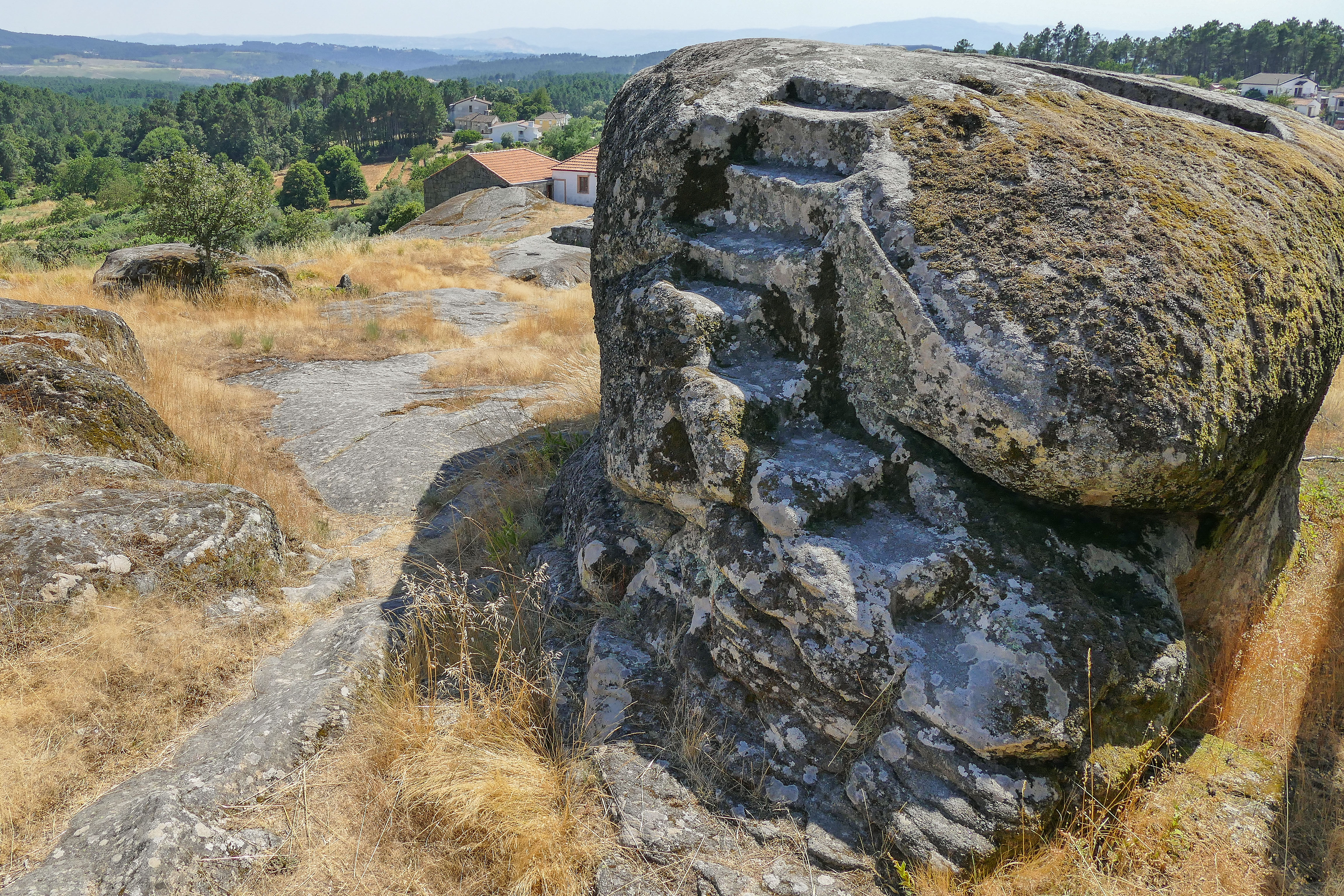
- The first stone, with the stairs
- Interactive map of Panoias Sanctuary
- 41°17′0″N 7°40′55″W
- Type: Ruins
- Periods: Centuries II & III
- Location: Vila Real, Douro, Norte, Portugal

Site notes
- Owner: Portuguese Republic
- Public access: Vale de Nogueiras, Lugar do Assento, in km 1 of EN 578

The Panóias Sanctuary, also called "Fragas de Panóias", is located in Vale de Nogueiras, in the municipality of Vila Real, Portugal, a few kilometres from the city.

Its construction dates back to the end of the 2nd century - early 3rd century AD.

== Distribution ==
The sanctuary is an enclosure with three large rocks, where several cavities of various sizes were opened and access stairs were also built.

On the rock located at the entrance of the enclosure, several inscriptions were engraved - three in Latin and one in Greek, describing the ritual celebrated, the gods to whom it was dedicated and who it dedicated.

One of them was destroyed in the last century, but it was reconstituted from previous readings and records.

== Inscriptions ==
=== First Inscription (missing) ===
The missing inscription, in Latin, was located 6/7 meters east of the second inscription, on the right side of the path where you enter the sacred area. The text would be oriented to the rock at the entrance of the enclosure and said the following:

DIIS (loci) HVIVS HOSTIAE QVAE CA / DVNT HIC INMOLATVR / EXTRA INTRA QVADRATA / CONTRA CREMANTVR / SANGVIS LACICVLIS IVXTA / SVPERE FVNDITV

"To the Gods and Goddesses of this sacred place. The victims sacrifice themselves, and are killed in this place. The viscera are burned in the square cavities in front. Blood is poured here to the side for the small cavities. It was established by Gaius C. Calpurnius Rufinus, a member of the senatorial order. "

=== Second Inscription ===
For the rock at the entrance, you go up some steps, and before going up, on the left, you will find the second inscription:

DIIS CVM AEDE / ET LACV M. QVI / VOTO MISCETVR / G(neus) C(aius) CALP(urnius) RUFI / NVS V(ir) C(larissimus)

"To the gods, with the Aedes and the pond, the subterranean passage, which is joined by vote."

"GC Calpurnius Rufinus consecrated within the temple (temple understood as sacred precinct), an aedes, a sanctuary, dedicated to the Severe Gods."

=== Third Inscription ===
The vestiges of one of the small temples existing in the enclosure remain. Climbing the stairs and passing to the other side of the rock, you will find the third inscription:

DIIS DEABVSQVE AE / TERNVM LACVM OMNI / BVSQVE NVMINIBVS / ET LAPITEARVM CVM HOC TEMPLO SACRAVIT / G(neus) C(aius) CALP(urnius) RVFINVS V(ir) C(larissimus) / IN QVO HOSTIAE VOTO CREMANTVR

"To all the gods and goddesses, to all the divinities, especially those of the Lapiteas, I dedicate this eternal pool, with this temple, Gaius v. Calpurnius Rufinus, enlightened man, in which victims are burned by vote."

"To the Gods and Goddesses and also to all the divinities of the Lapitaes, Gaius C. Calpurnius Rufinus, a member of the senatorial order, consecrated a cavity with this sacred enclosure forever, in which the victims were burned following the rite."

This inscription reveals that the enclosure is dedicated not only to the Severe Gods but also to the Gods of the Lapitae, gods of the indigenous community that would exist in the region.

=== Fourth Inscription ===
In front we have the fourth inscription (in Greek):

Y'l'ICTw CEPA PIDI CYN KANqA Pw KAY MYCTOPIOIC C. C. CALP.RVFINVS V|C.

"The enlightened male Caio Calpúrnio Rufino, son of Caio, consecrated, together with a pond and the mysteries, (a temple) to the highest god Serápis."

"To the highest Serápis, with Destiny and Mysteries, GC Calpurnius Rufinus, very clear."

The senator consecrated the sacred precinct to the main divinity of the gods of Hell, the Most High Serápis, including a gastra and mysteries. Gastra, a round cavity, is immediately behind the inscription. Its function in the ritual would be to roast the victim's meat, which was consumed on the spot, in front of the name of the deity.

=== Fifth Inscription ===
The fifth inscription indicates the final act:

DIIS SE(veris) MAN(ibus) DIIS IRA(tis) / DIIS DEABVSQVE (loca) / TIS (hic sacravit lacum et) / AEDEM (Gneus Caius Ca) LP (urnius Ru) FINVS (Clarissimus Vir)

"To the angry infernal gods who live here, (dedicated) Gaius c. Calpurnius Rufinus, enlightened man."

"To the gods, GC Calpurnius Rufinus, very clearly, with this (temple) also offers a cavity for mixing."

In this place, the initiate purified himself with blood, butter and oil with which he had become dirty.

== Description of the site ==
This interpretation of Panóias is by Géza Alföldy. Based on his studies, we can today say that we had an initiation ritual in place with a very precise order and itinerary - the killing of the victims, always animals and never human, the blood sacrifice, the cremation of the victims, the consumption of the flesh, the revelation of the name of the highest authority of hell, and finally the purification. In the second rock of the enclosure the initiation was repeated to a higher degree, and in the third rock, the highest, there was a small temple, where the main act of initiation took place - ritual death, burial and resurrection.

Today in any of the three rocks we have vestiges of the small temples that were an integral part of the enclosure. There are also the different rectangular cavities that served to burn the viscera, a round cavity - "gastra", to roast the meat, and still another where the blood, butter and oil were cleaned. Other cavities were related to the small existing temples, and were used to keep the sacred instruments used in rituals.

Therefore, in Panóias there are testimonies of a rite of initiation of the mysteries of the infernal divinities. The prescriptions are identified as parts of a sacred law, but applied to a specific and precise place. The choice of this place was not made by chance, but as the result of specific and previously established criteria. The topography of the place played an important role here.

== The ritual ==
The first stone contains the stairs and, next to it, the "lacus" and the "laciculus". The recess for the foundations to build a temple, made in the granite rock, is visible. Inside it, carved in the rock, the purifying "lavacra" where the "mystae" were cleaned before offering the victims, or the deposits where the priests kept the instruments of sacrifice.

In the second stone there is a hole that would serve for an iron or bronze pole, supported by two struts, where the animals were tied to be sacrificed, which were adorned with garlands. The priests, with white robes and crowns made of laurel/oak/holly/ivy/vine branches, according to the god for whom the sacrifice was intended, carried the "pátera", a kind of round metal plates, in their hands. Later, the "victimarii" came, armed with the "securis", a hatchet used to quarter the victims.

When everything was ready, a herald would impose silence and the profane would leave the holy place. The priests sprayed the victim with the "mola". Those present drank a little wine, with which they also made the libation, spilling a little on the animal's head. The fire was lit in the respective "lacus" and the incense was burned. There, the "Popae", naked from the waist up, led the victim to the altar, where it was mortally wounded with an axe by the "Cultrarii", who cut his neck. The blood was collected in the "patera" and spilled in the "laciculi". The victim was placed on the "anchorbris" table, skinned and dismembered. According to a caption destroyed decades ago,

In this stone a group of "lavacra" (the referred purifying ponds) is also visible, as well as the foundations of a second temple, whose ashlars can be found in the current walls of the houses of the neighbouring village, mainly on the floor of the church.

A little further north, in the direction we follow, we come across a "lacus", where we can see the grooves that held the iron bars that supported the grill where the victims' meat was roasted, and the "laciculus", where the blood.

About twenty meters, on the eastern side, the remains of a pre-Roman altar are still preserved in a small rock, made up of various holes joined by grooves, where the "Lapiteas" would carry out the worship of their gods, such as "Reva Marandiguius", a divinity who lived in the heights of the Marão, and, hypothetically, the snakes and wild boars.

Continuing north, by a stairway dug into the rock, you come across another altar of the "Lapiteas", consisting of a cave and a furrow.

== Bibliography ==
- ALFÖLDY, Géza (1995) - Inscripciones, sacrificios y misterios: el santuario rupestre de Panóias/Portugal: informe preliminar. In Madrider Mitteilungen. Mainz am Rhein. 36, p. 252258.
- ARGOTE, Jerónimo Contador de (). Panoyas. Vila Real: Junta Distrital, p. 32.
- COLMENERO, António Rodríguez (1999) - O santuário rupestre galaico-romano de Panóias (Vila Real, Portugal): novas achegas para a sua reinterpretaçao global, Vila Real.
- CORTEZ, Fernando Russell (1947) - Panóias. Cividade dos Lapiteas. Subsídios para o estudo dos cultos orientais e da vida provincial romana na região do Douro. In Separata dos Anais do Instituto do Vinho do Porto. Porto. p. 76.
- LAMBRINO, Scarlat (1953) - Les divinités orientales en Lusitanie et le sanctuaire de Panóias. In Bulletin des Études Portugaises et de l'Institut Français au Portugal. Coimbra. 17, p. 93129.
- MACHADO, Fernando Falcão (1940) - O recinto sagrado de Panóias. In Portugal económico, monumental e artístico. Lisboa: Ed. Lusitana, p. 2528.
- PEREIRA, Félix Alves (1906) - As fragas de Panóias. In O Arqueólogo Português. Lisboa. 1ª série: 11, p. 6365.
- PINHO, Luís Miguel B. B. da Silva (1993) - Breves considerações sobre o santuário romano de Panóias. In Revista de Estudos Transmontanos. Vila Real. 5, p. 175187.
- VASCONCELLOS, José de Leite de (1897) - Estudos sobre Panoias. In O Arqueólogo Português. Lisboa. 3, p. 5861, 177180.
- VASCONCELLOS, José de Leite de (1888) - Uma inscripção lusoromana de Panóias. In Revista Archeológica. Lisboa. 2, p. 50; 69.
- VASCONCELLOS, José de Leite de (1908) - Inscripção romana de Panóias. In O Arqueólogo Português. Lisboa. 1ª série: 13, p. 283284.

== Gallery ==
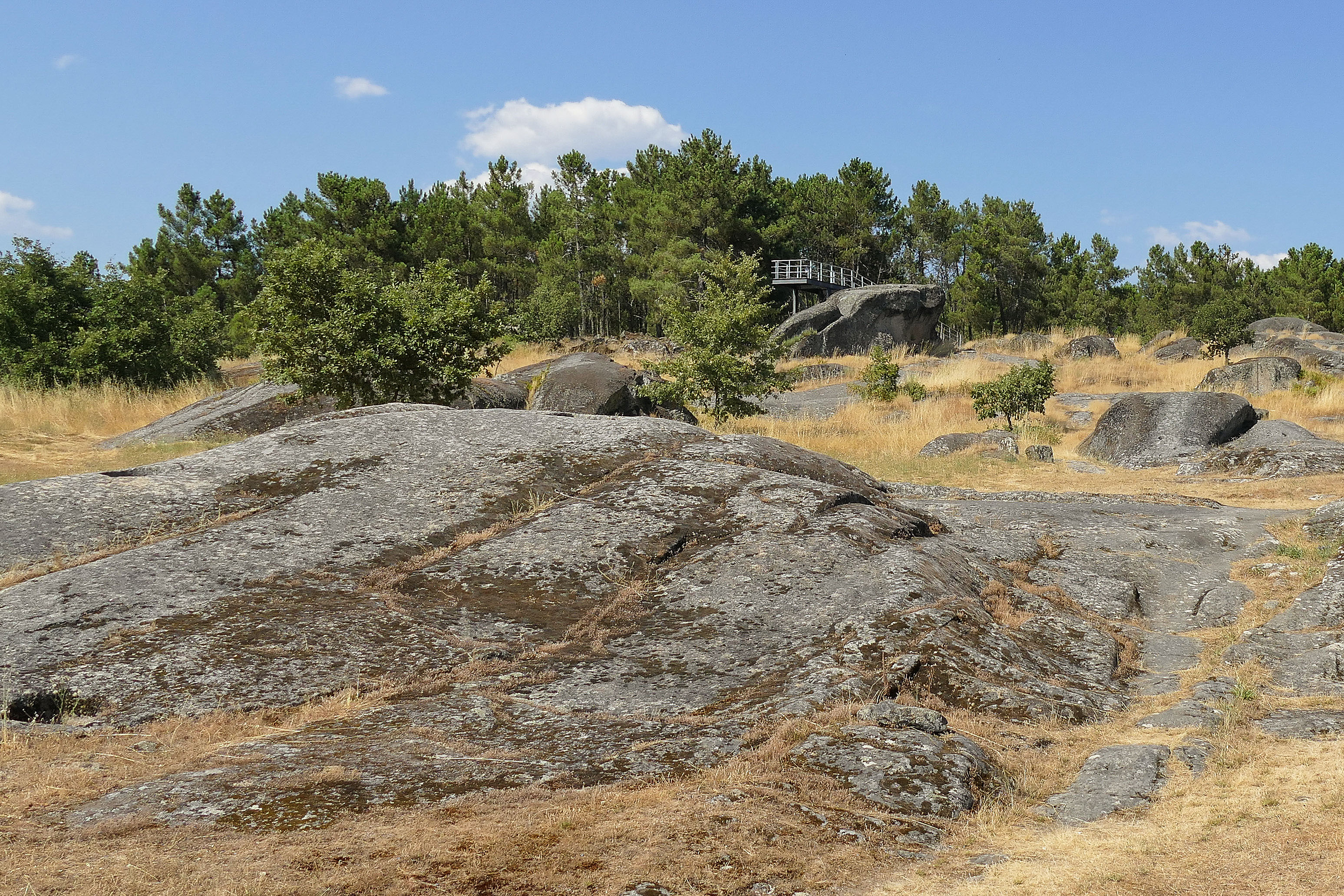
General view

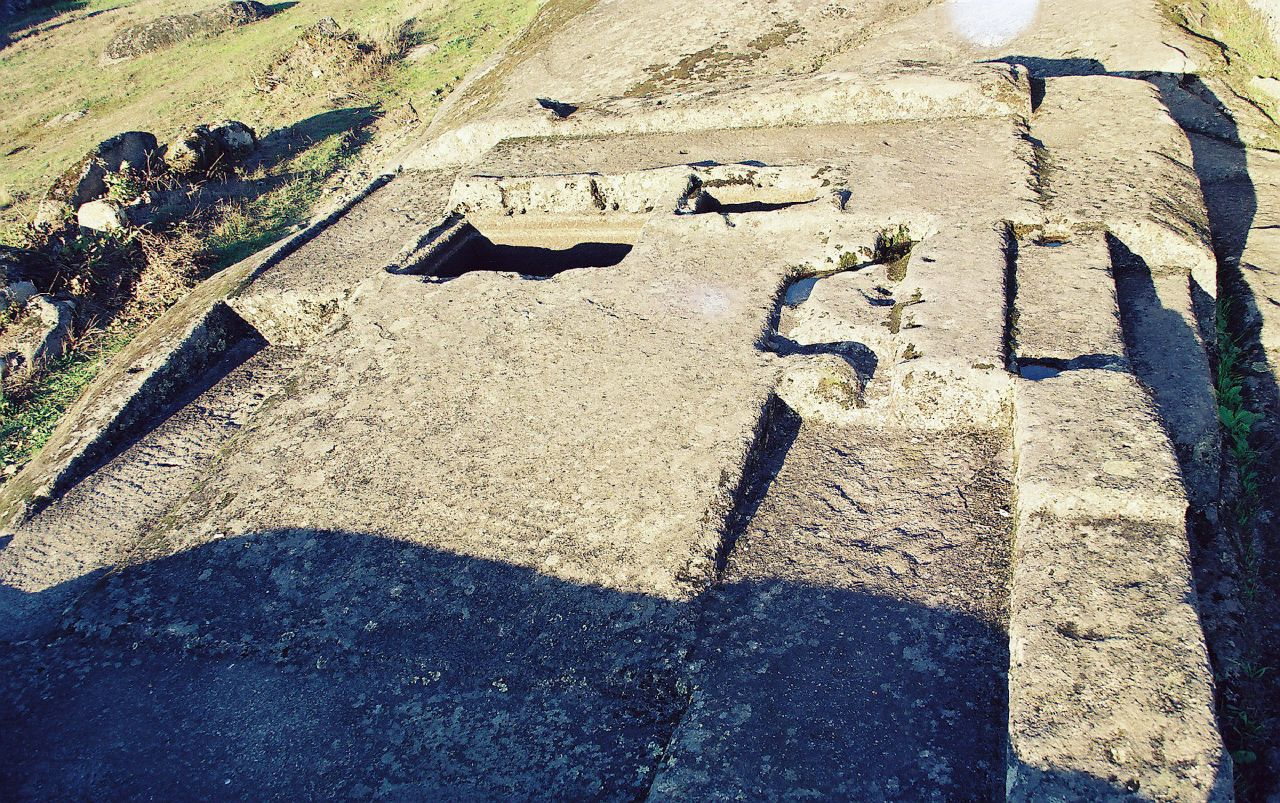
Rock known as "B"

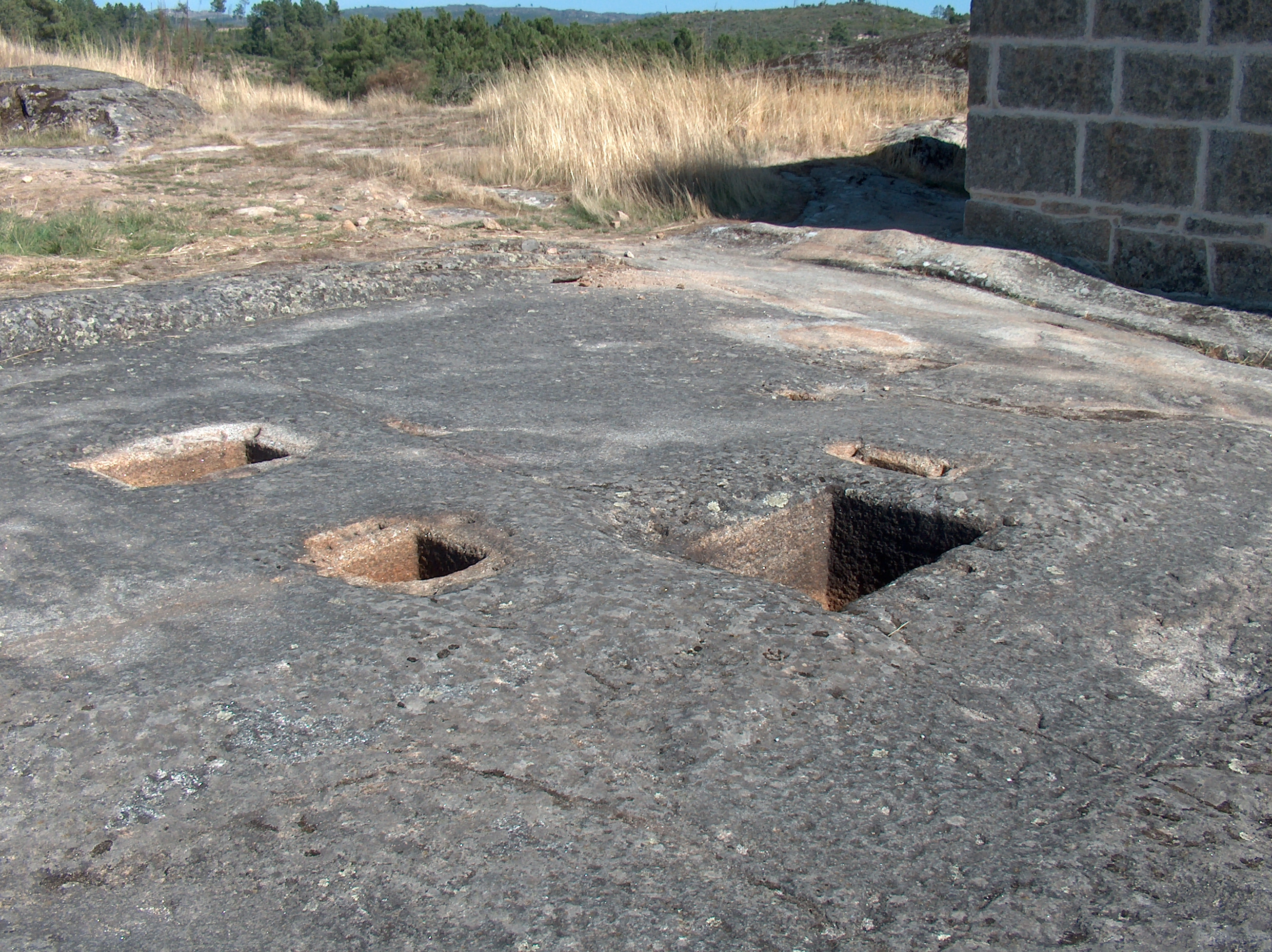

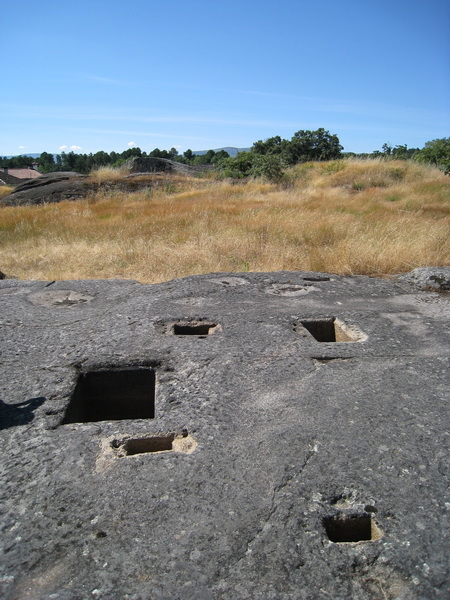

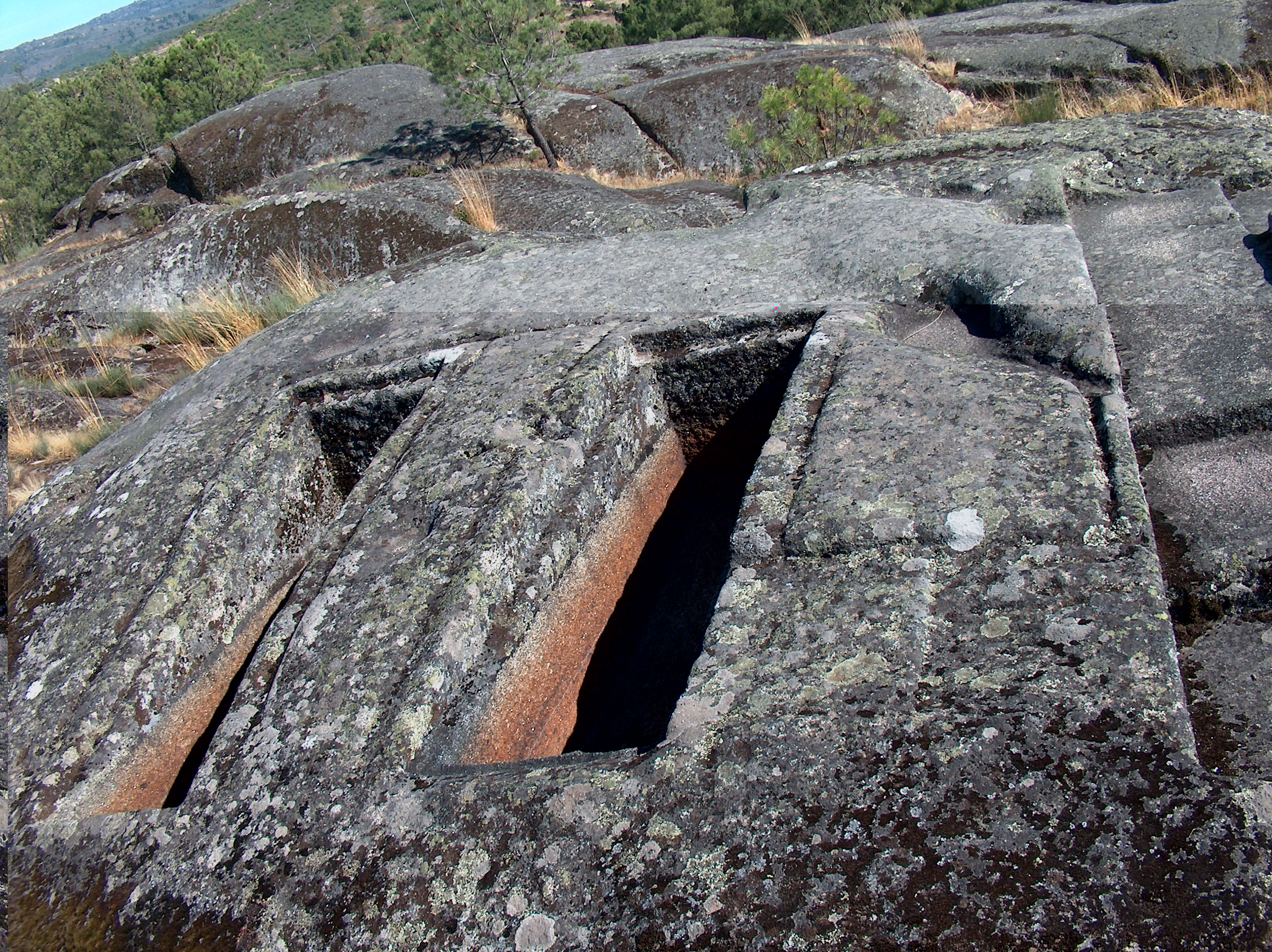
Rock known as "A"

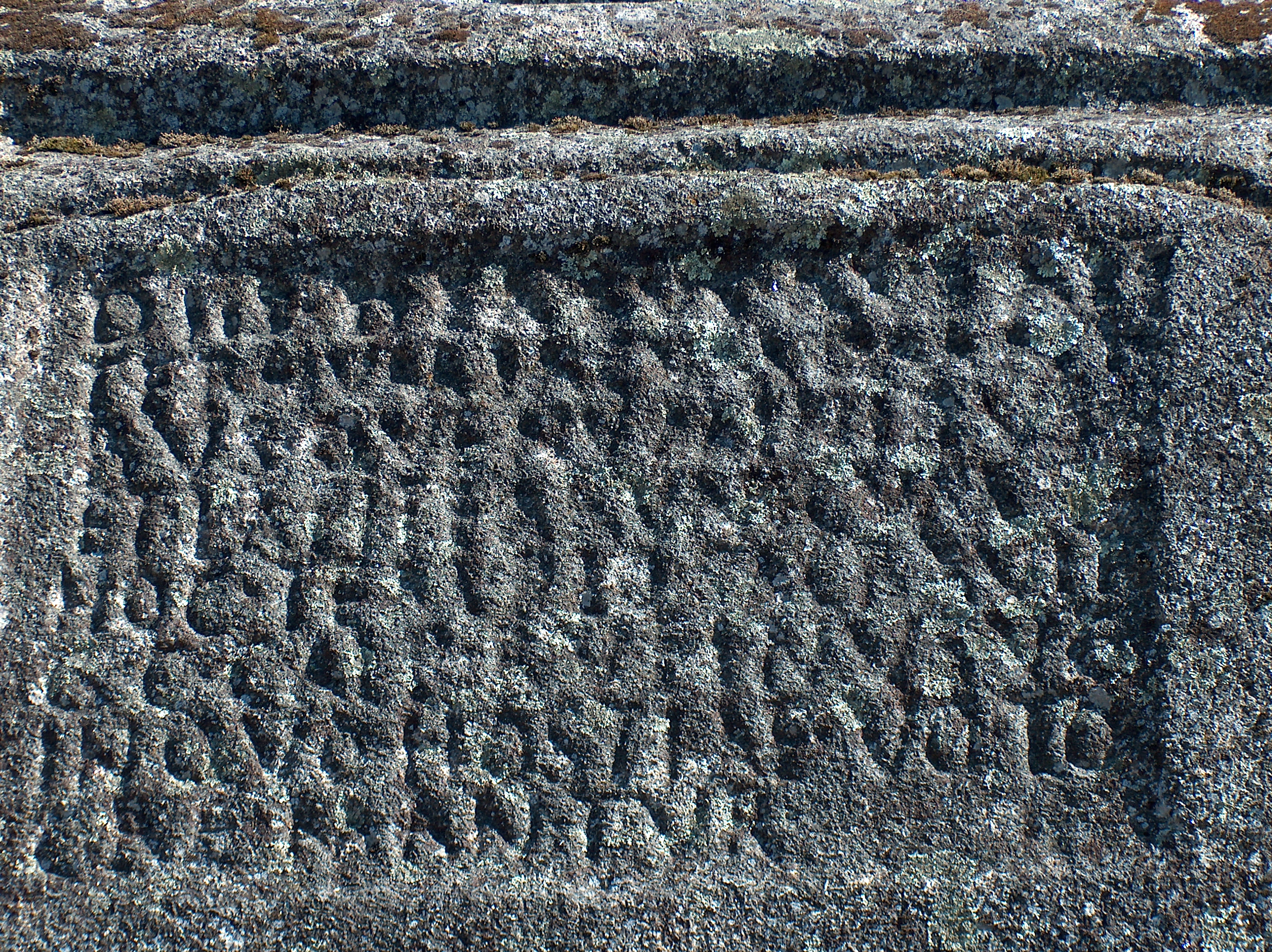
One of the Inscriptions

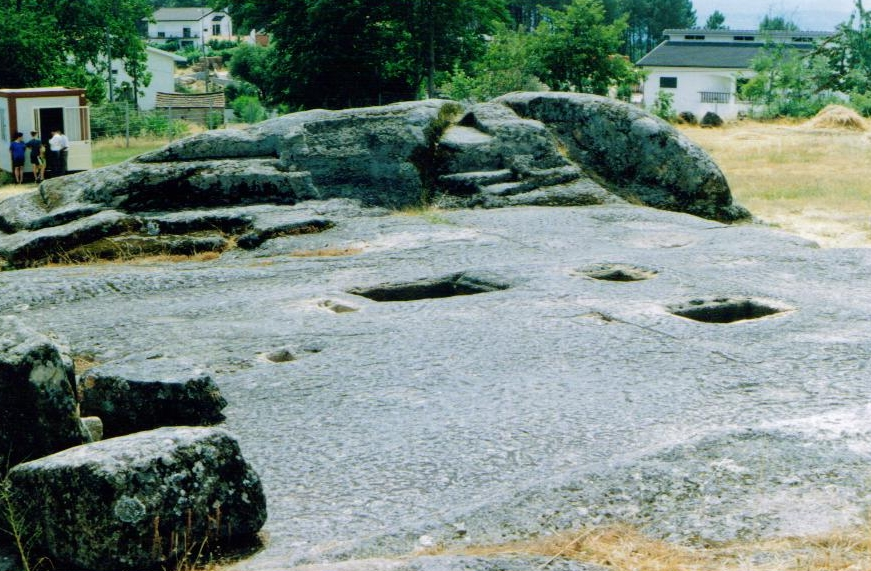

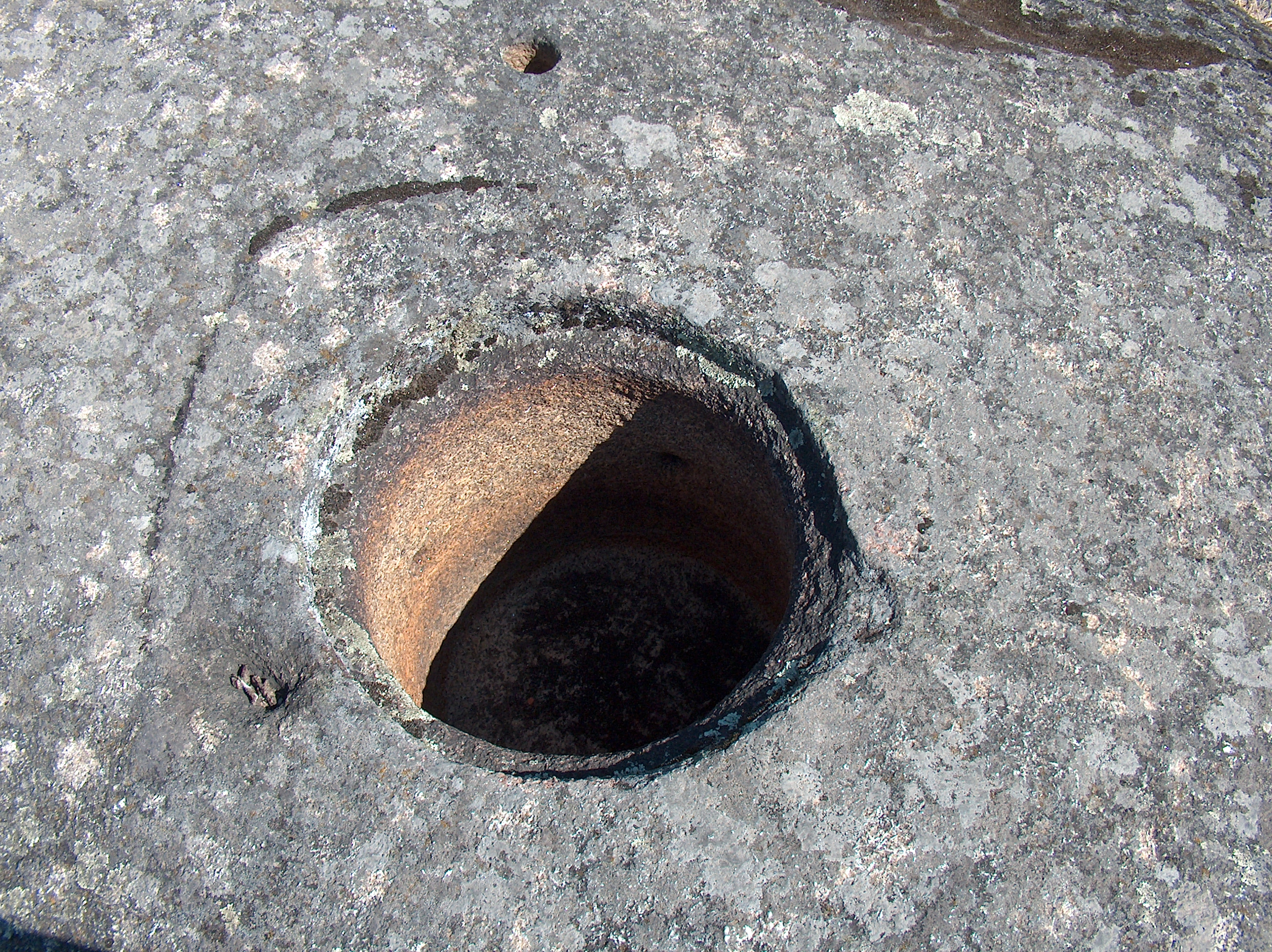

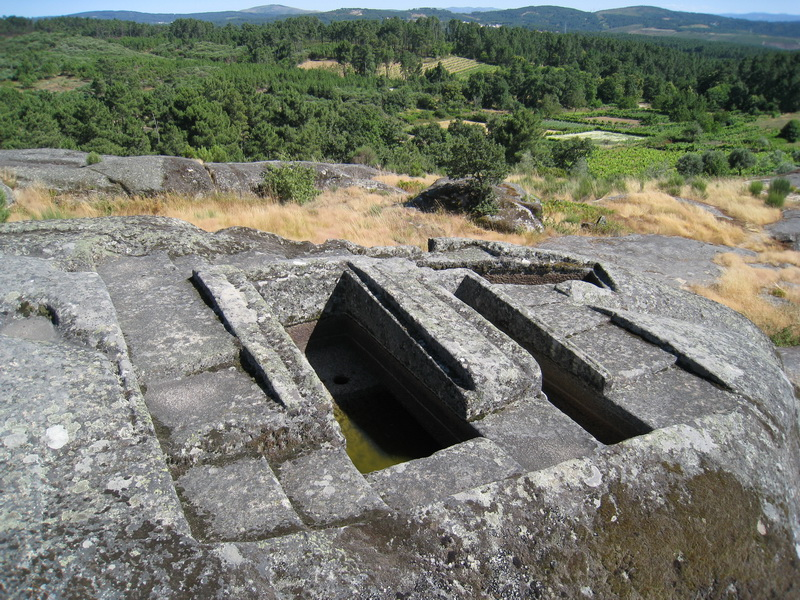

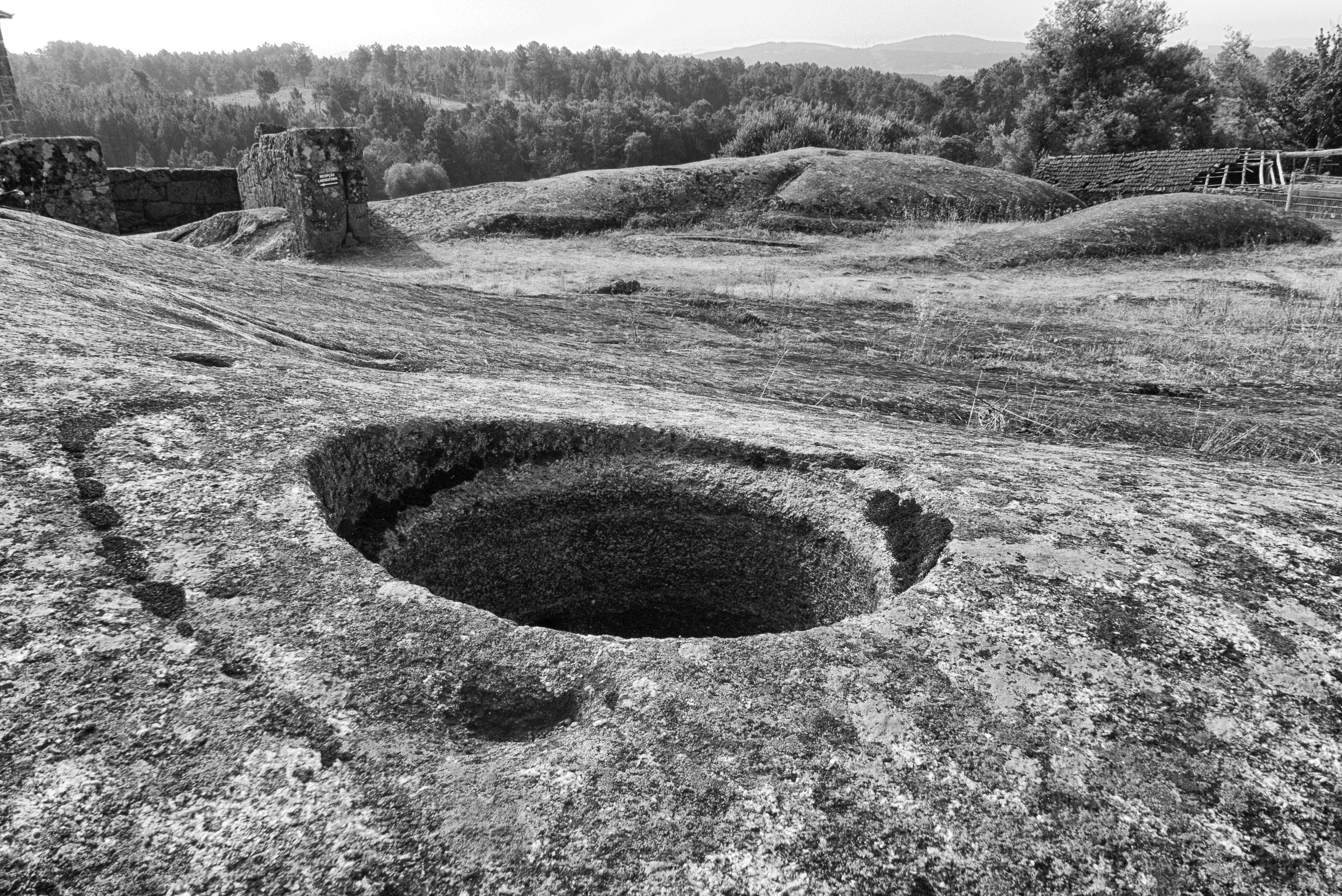

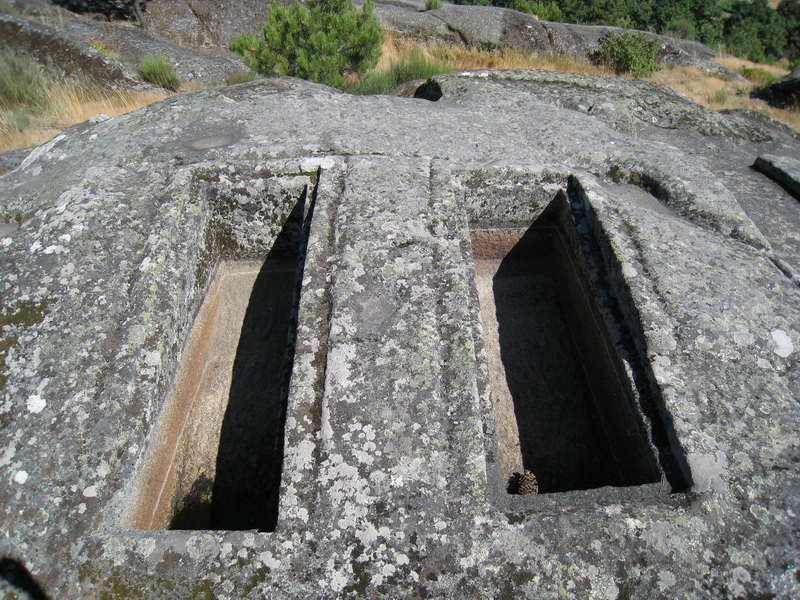

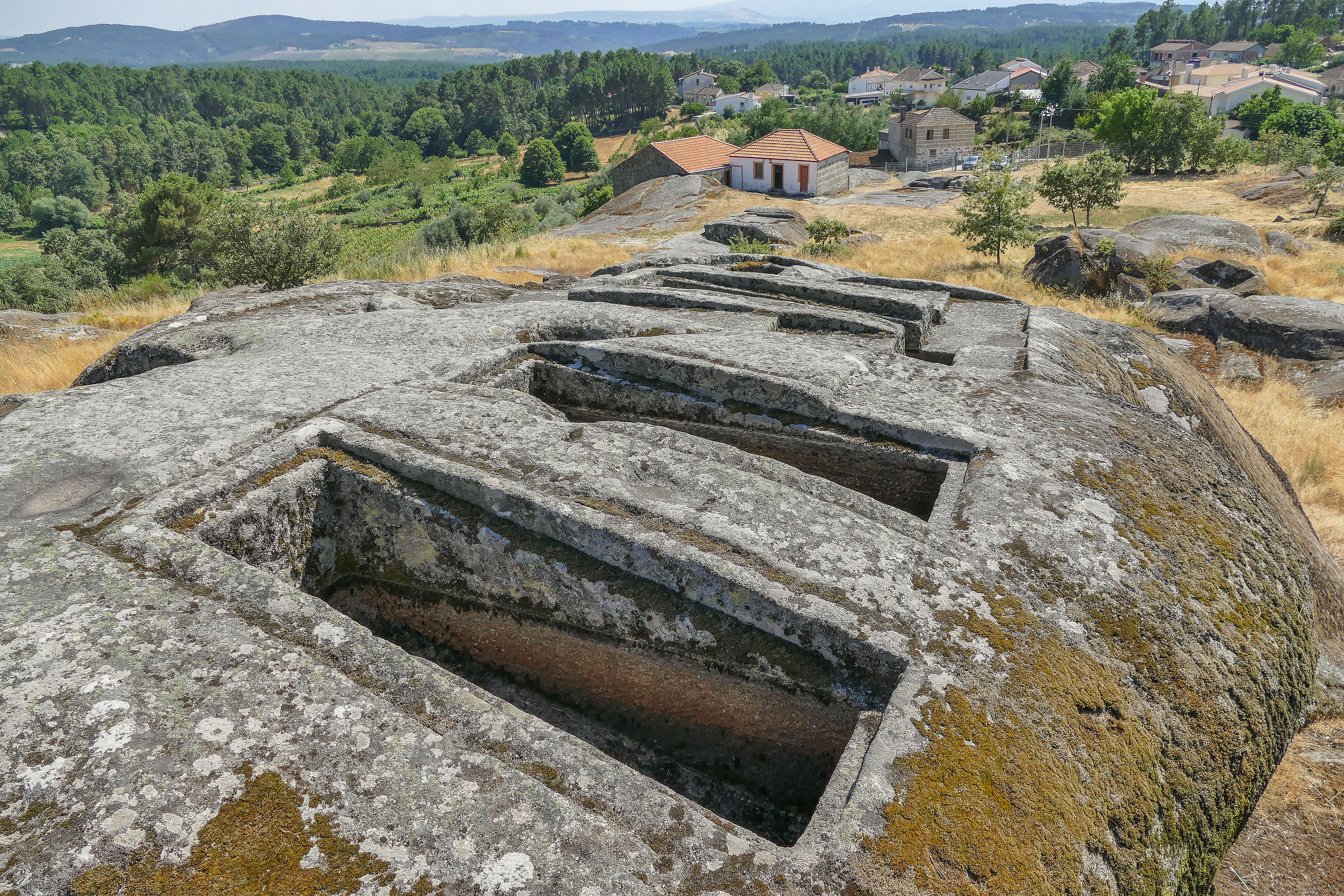
