= Mondim de Basto railway station =

Closed railway station in northern Portugal

Mondim de Basto railway station Estação Ferroviária de Mondim de Basto
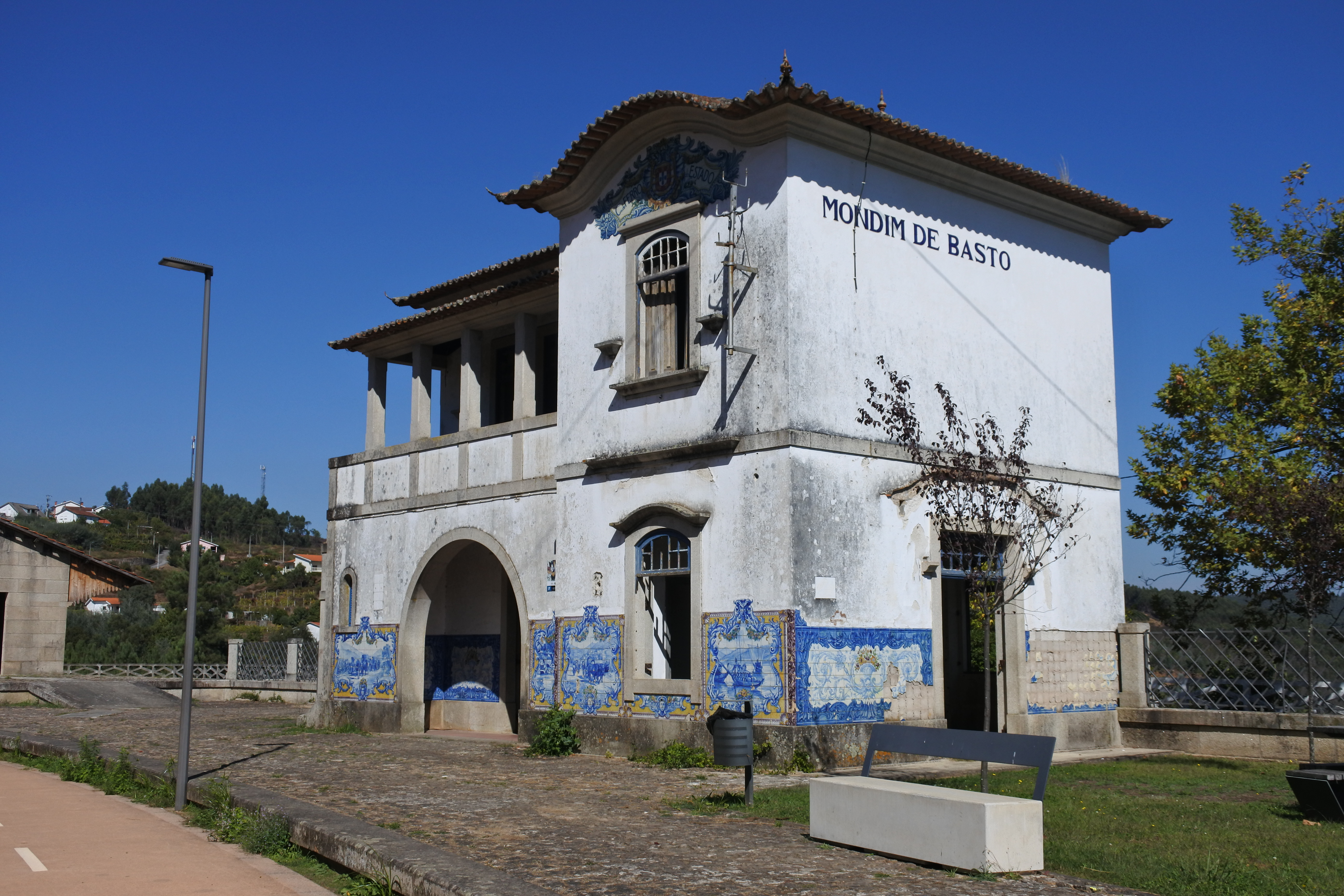
- Mondim de Basto station in 2016

General information
- Location: Mondim de Basto; Portugal
- Coordinates: 41.4117176°N 7.9684303°W
- Line: Tâmega line (1949–1990)
- Connections: Padredo; Britelo

History
- Opened: 15 January 1949
- Closed: 2 January 1990
Location
- Location within Portugal

The Mondim de Basto railway station was a station on the Tâmega Line, which served the town of Mondim de Basto, in the Vila Real District of Portugal, even if technically located in Veade, part of the Celorico de Basto municipality.

== History ==
The Mondim de Basto railway station was part of the section of the Tâmega line between Celorico de Basto and Arco de Baúlhe, which was inaugurated on 15 January 1949, by the Portuguese Railway Company.

Due to the reduced traffic, the section between Arco de Baúlhe and Amarante was closed to service on 2 January 1990, as part of a restructuring plan by the CP.

After three decades of abandonment and structural decay, the Celorico de Basto city council restored the station and its azulejos, being inaugurated on 5 March 2023.

== See also ==
- Infraestruturas de Portugal
- Comboios de Portugal
- Rail transport in Portugal
- History of rail transport in Portugal

== Bibliography ==
- REIS, Francisco; GOMES, Rosa; GOMES, Gilberto; et al. (2006). Os Caminhos de Ferro Portugueses 1856-2006. Lisboa: CP-Comboios de Portugal e Público-Comunicação Social S. A. p. 238. ISBN 989-619-078-X.
