= Serra do Marão =

Mountain in Portugal

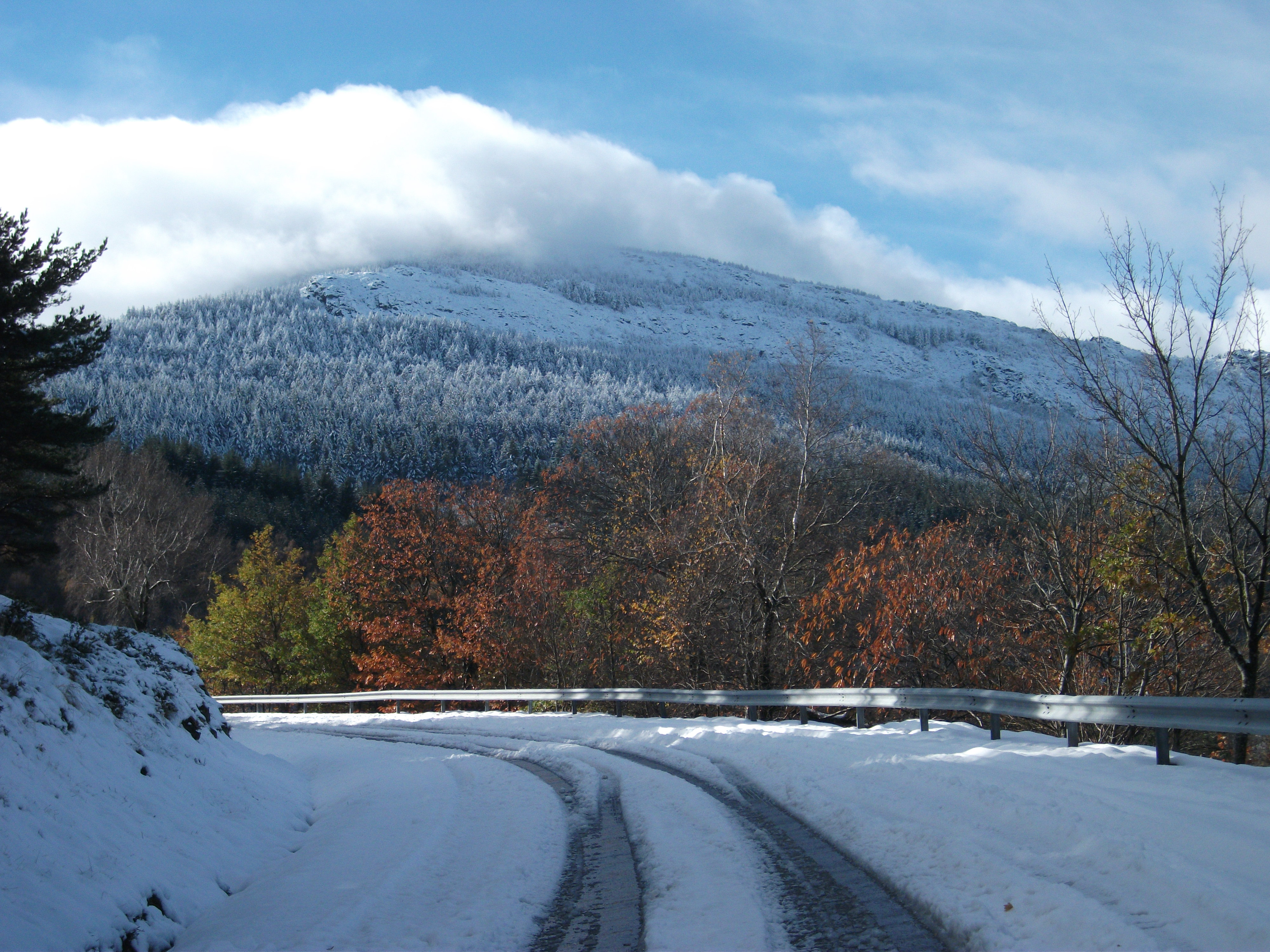
- Serra do Marão

Highest point
- Elevation: 1,415 m (4,642 ft)
- Prominence: 689 m (2,260 ft)
- Coordinates: 41°14′54.0″N 7°53′12.9″W

Geography
- Location: Trás-os-Montes e Alto Douro and Douro Litoral, Portugal Location of Serra do Marão in Portugal

Serra do Marão is the sixth highest mountain range in continental Portugal, rising up to 1415 meters. It is located at the border between Trás-os-Montes (District of Vila Real) and Douro Litoral (District of Porto) regions.
