= Luís Wittnich Carrisso =

Portuguese botanist and professor

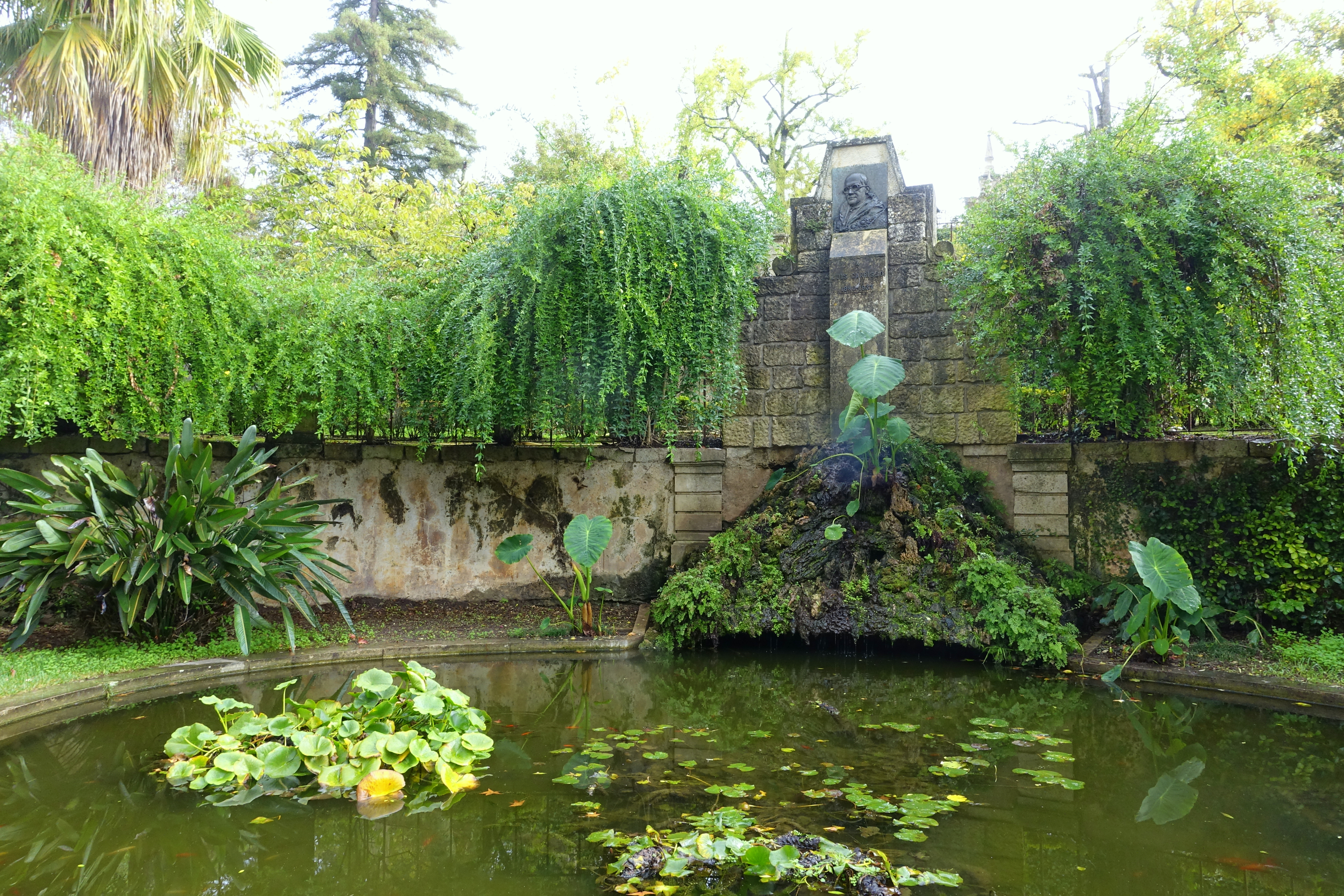
- Memorial to Luís Carrisso in the Jardim Botânico da Universidade de Coimbra
- Born: 14 February 1886; São Julião, Figueira da Foz
- Died: 6 June 1937 (aged 51); Moçâmedes Desert, Angola
- Occupation(s): Botanist, professor

Luís Wittnich Carrisso (14 February 1886 – 14 June 1937) was a Portuguese botanist, professor at the University of Coimbra.

Carrisso was born in Figueira da Foz. He attended the Faculty of Philosophy of University of Coimbra (1904-1910). After graduating he became a student of botanist Julio Augusto Henriques. Carrisso took interest in evolution and heredity and presented his PhD thesis Hereditariedade in 1911. He published scientific work on ecology and plant systematics.

In 1918, he became Professor of Botany at University of Coimbra's Botanical Garden. He was a supporter of Charles Darwin's theory of evolution but was skeptical of the role of natural selection. He embraced mutationism.

He died on 6 June 1937 in the Namib desert (Moçâmedes), in Angola, of cardiac syncope, during his third botanical expedition to that country. A monument was erected at the site in his memory.

== Eponymy ==
- Carrissoa
