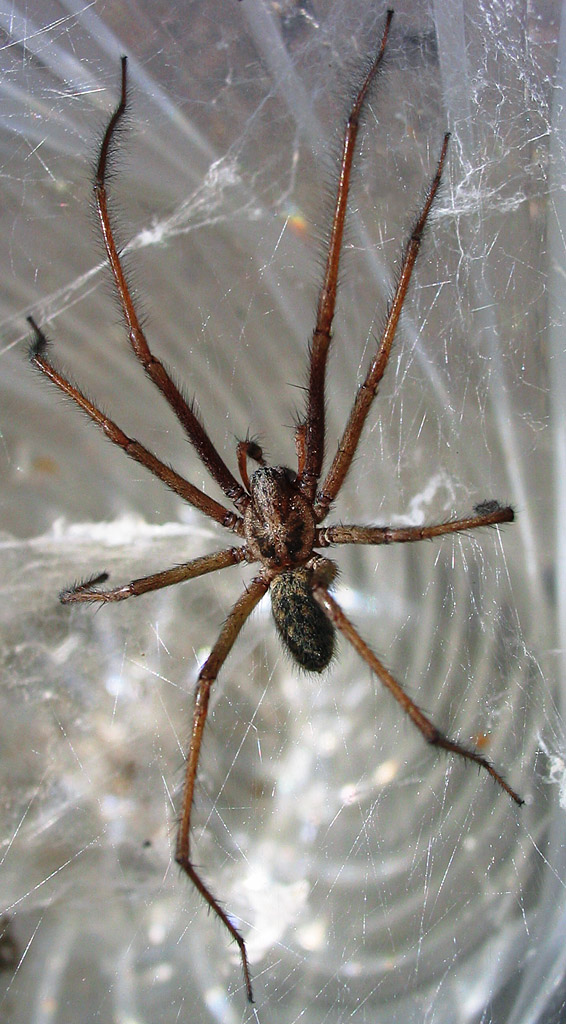
- E. atrica, the giant house spider
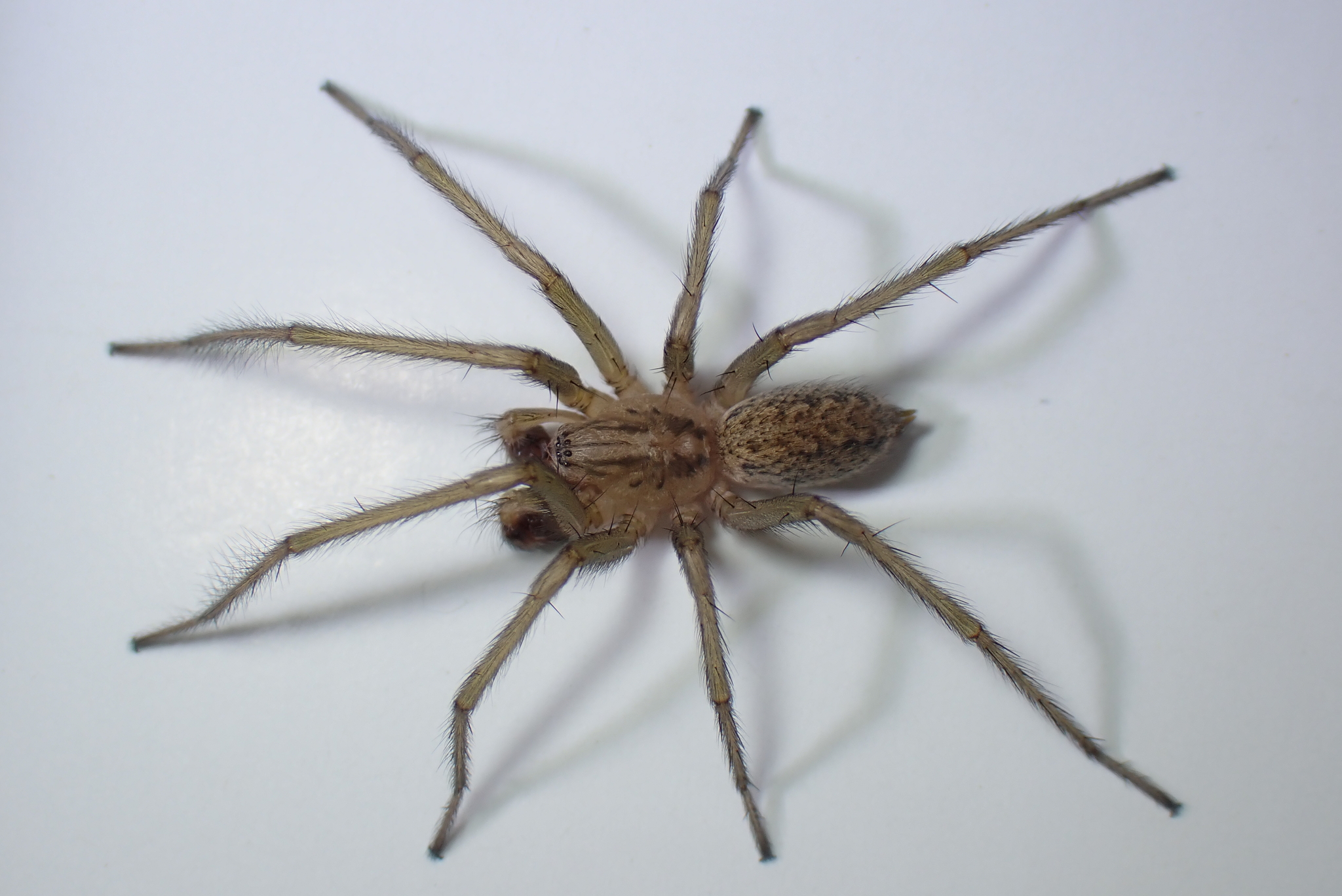
- male E. agrestis (hobo spider) in France

Scientific classification
- Kingdom: Animalia
- Phylum: Arthropoda
- Subphylum: Chelicerata
- Class: Arachnida
- Order: Araneae
- Infraorder: Araneomorphae
- Family: Agelenidae
- Genus: Eratigena; Bolzern, Burckhardt & Hänggi, 2013

Type species
- Tegenaria atrica C.L. Koch, 1843

Species
- 39, See text.
- blue: reported countries (WSC)

= Eratigena =

Genus of spiders

Eratigena is a genus of spider in the family Agelenidae. Most of its species were moved from the genus Tegenaria in 2013, of which the genus name is an anagram. Several species that frequently build webs in and around human dwellings are now placed in this genus: Eratigena agrestis (known as the hobo spider in the United States), native to Europe and Central Asia and introduced to North America, and the three species of giant house spider (Eratigena atrica, E. duellica, and E. saeva), native to Europe and also introduced into North America.

== Description ==
They are medium to large spiders. Two symmetrical dark bands are present dorsally on the carapace, which can be serrated or reduced, usually to three or four conspicuous triangles. They also have plumose hairs on the carapace, legs, and opisthosoma. Their rows of eyes are only slightly curved in either direction.

== Taxonomy ==
=== Phylogeny ===
Species now placed in the genus Eratigena were previously placed in Tegenaria and Malthonica. In 2013, a study was carried out on European house spiders in the "Tegenaria-Malthonica complex". Using both morphological and molecular data, the study found four well-supported clades, one of which constituted a new genus Eratigena, comprising species formerly placed in Tegenaria and Malthonica. The name Eratigena is an anagram of Tegenaria. Some Tegenaria species had previously been separated into the new genus Aterigena, another anagram of Tegenaria.

Although the genera involved in the study were consistently found to be monophyletic, different analyses found different relationships among them. Based on both morphological and DNA data, one hypothesis for the phylogeny of Eratigena and related genera is:

- - - Aterigena
    - - Eratigena
      - - Histopona
        - - Malthonica
          - Tegenaria

=== Identification ===
Bolzern et al. (2013) provide a key to the European agelenid genera. Eratigena can be differentiated from Malthonica by the un-notched trochanters on legs III and IV (notched in Malthonica). The genus differs from Tegenaria in the number and size of the teeth on the rear margin of the chelicerae. Eratigena has six or more teeth, with those closer to the body of the spider being smaller. Tegenaria has three to six large teeth, more or less equal in size.

=== Species ===
As of October 2026, the World Spider Catalog accepted the following thirty-nine species:

- Eratigena agrestis (Walckenaer, 1802) – Europe to Central Asia, introduced into USA and Canada (hobo spider)
- Eratigena arganoi (Brignoli, 1971) – Italy
- Eratigena atrica (C. L. Koch, 1843) – Europe, introduced in North America (giant house spider)
- Eratigena balearica (Brignoli, 1978) – Balearic Islands
- Eratigena barrientosi (Bolzern, Crespo & Cardoso, 2009) – Portugal
- Eratigena blanda (Gertsch, 1971) – Mexico
- Eratigena bucculenta (L. Koch, 1868) – Portugal, Spain
- Eratigena caverna (Gertsch, 1971) – Mexico
- Eratigena decora (Gertsch, 1971) – Mexico
- Eratigena duellica (Simon, 1875) – Canada, US, Europe (giant house spider)
- Eratigena edmundoi Bolzern & Hänggi, 2016 – Mexico
- Eratigena feminea (Simon, 1870) – Portugal, Spain, Madeira, Algeria
- Eratigena fernandoi Bolzern & Hänggi, 2016 – Mexico
- Eratigena flexuosa (F. O. Pickard-Cambridge, 1902) – Mexico
- Eratigena florea (Brignoli, 1974) – Mexico
- Eratigena fuesslini (Pavesi, 1873) – Europe
- Eratigena gertschi (Roth, 1968) – Mexico
- Eratigena guanato Bolzern & Hänggi, 2016 – Mexico
- Eratigena herculea (Fage, 1931) – Spain, Ibiza
- Eratigena hispanica (Fage, 1931) – Spain
- Eratigena incognita (Bolzern, Crespo & Cardoso, 2009) – Portugal
- Eratigena inermis (Simon, 1870) – Portugal, Spain, France
- Eratigena laksao Bolzern & Jäger, 2015 – Laos
- Eratigena mexicana (Roth, 1968) – Mexico
- Eratigena montigena (Simon, 1937) – Portugal, Spain
- Eratigena picta (Simon, 1870) – Europe, Russia, North Africa
- Eratigena queretaro Bolzern & Hänggi, 2016 – Mexico
- Eratigena rothi (Gertsch, 1971) – Mexico
- Eratigena saeva (Blackwall, 1844) – Western Europe, Canada (giant house spider)
- Eratigena sardoa (Brignoli, 1977) – Sardinia
- Eratigena selva (Roth, 1968) – Mexico
- Eratigena serrana (Barrientos & Sánchez-Corral, 2013) – Spain
- Eratigena sicana (Brignoli, 1976) – Sicily, Sardinia
- Eratigena talassemtane Lecigne & Bosmans, 2023 – Morocco
- Eratigena tlaxcala (Roth, 1968) – Mexico
- Eratigena vidua (Cárdenas & Barrientos, 2011) – Spain
- Eratigena vomeroi (Brignoli, 1977) – Italy
- Eratigena xilitla Bolzern & Hänggi, 2016 – Mexico
- Eratigena yarini Bolzern & Hänggi, 2016 – Mexico

== See also ==
- House spider

== Bibliography ==
- Bolzern, Angelo; Burckhardt, Daniel & Hänggi, Ambros (26 July 2013), "Phylogeny and taxonomy of European funnel-web spiders of the Tegenaria−Malthonica complex (Araneae: Agelenidae) based upon morphological and molecular data", Zoological Journal of the Linnean Society, 168 (4): 723–848, doi:10.1111/zoj.12040
