= Moçâmedes (disambiguation) =

Moçâmedes is a city in southwestern Angola.

Moçâmedes may also refer to:

- Moçâmedes, the former name of Namibe Province, Angola
- Mossâmedes, a small city in the state of Goiás, Brazil

== See also ==
- Moçâmedes Desert, an Angolan desert near the border with Namibia
- Moçâmedes Railway, an Angolan railway line between Moçâmedes and Menongue
