= Giant Spider =

Giant Spider may refer to:

== Species ==
- Giant house spider, common to Europe
- Giant wood spider, or Golden silk orb-weaver, found worldwide

== Mythology, folklore and fiction ==
- Giant Spider (Middle Earth), also known as Great Spiders
- Any depiction of oversized spider – see Cultural depictions of spiders, including:
  - Some depictions of Anansi from African folklore
  - Tsuchigumo, aka ōgumo (大蜘蛛, "giant spider"), a derogatory term and race of yōkai in Japanese folklore
  - Pennywise from the novel IT
  - Acromantulas from the novel series Harry Potter
  - Giant spiders, a type of monster in Dungeons & Dragons role playing game

== See also ==
- The Giant Spider Invasion, a 1975 sci-fi film
- Big Ass Spider!, a 2013 sci-fi comedy horror film
