= Domenico Vandelli =

Italian naturalist (1735–1816)

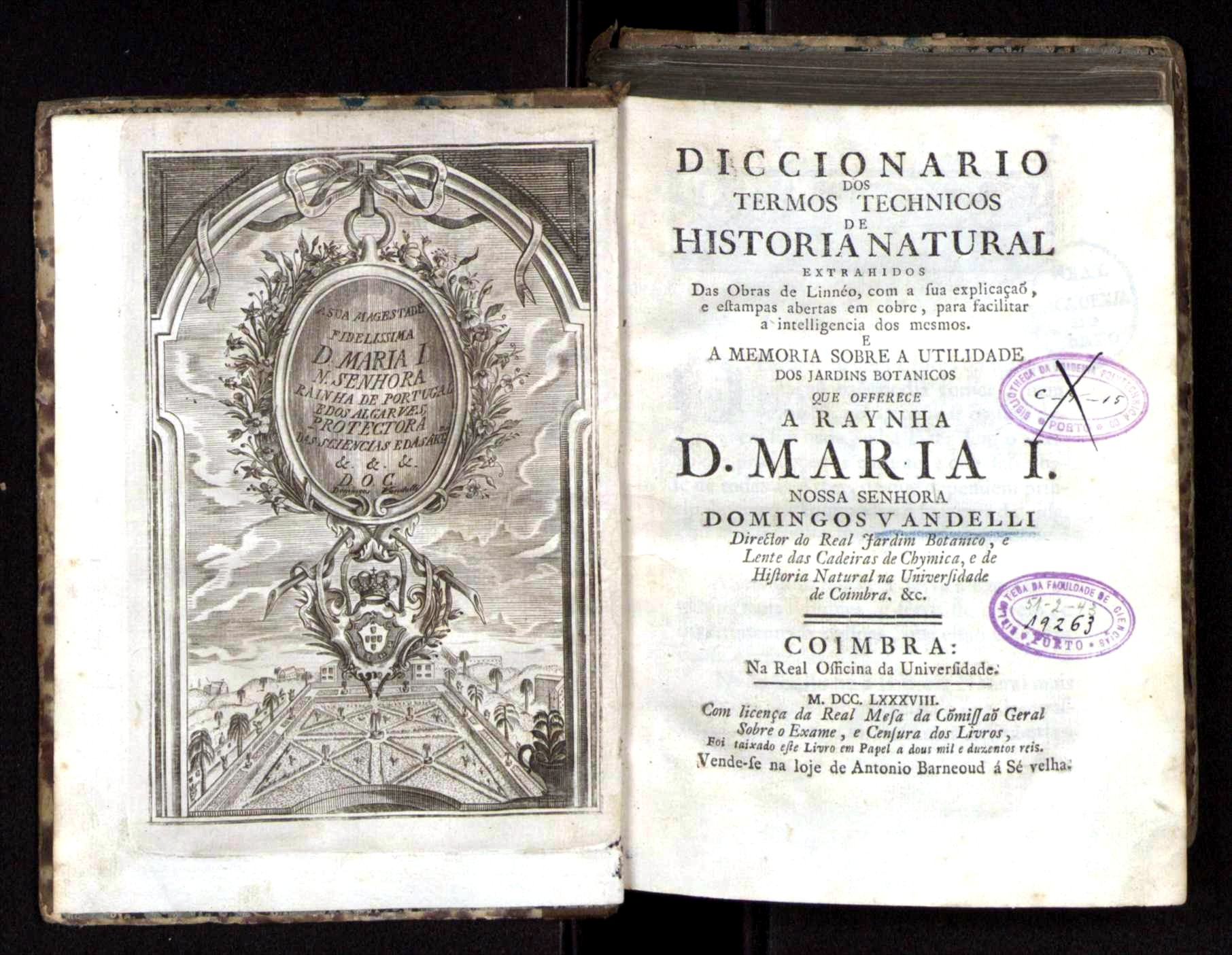

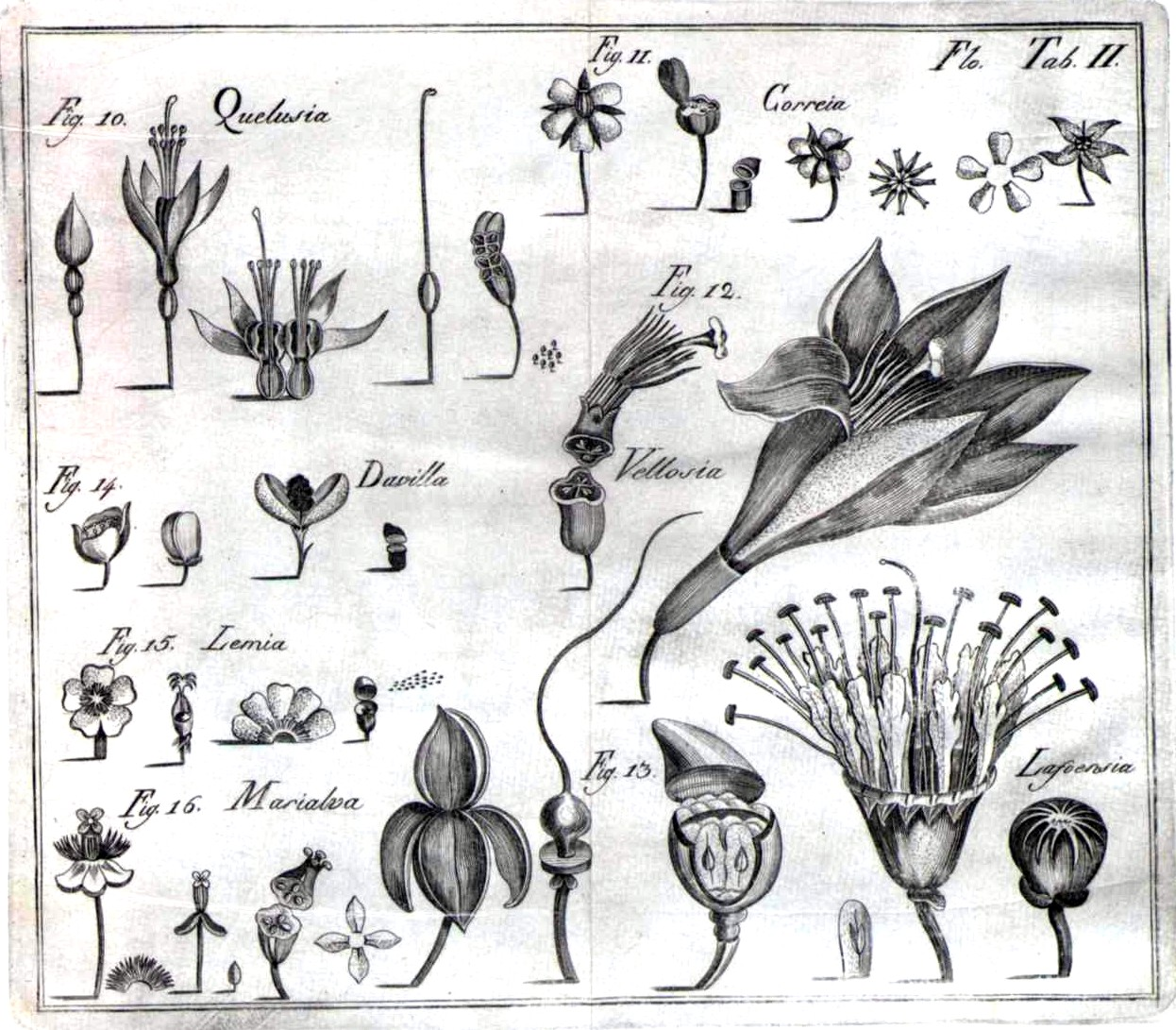

Domenico Agostino Vandelli (Padua, 8 July 1735 – Lisbon, 27 June 1816) was an Italian naturalist, who did most of his scientific work in Portugal.

He studied at the University of Padua, from which he received a doctorate in Natural Philosophy and Medicine in 1756. While active as naturalist in Italy he began a correspondence with the Swedish naturalist Carl von Linné, which continued for several years. In 1763 he was invited by Catherine the Great of Russia to join the faculty of the University of St. Petersburg, but he declined.

In 1764 Vandelli moved to Portugal, where in 1765 he was appointed lecturer in chemistry and natural sciences at the University of Coimbra. He was the first supervisor for the orientation of the Botanical Garden of the University of Coimbra, being followed in 1791 by Félix Avelar Brotero. One of his major works he published was the Tractatus de thermis agri patavini in 1761. In about 1793 he became the first director of the Botanical Gardens at the Palácio da Ajuda in Lisbon. He was one of the mentors of the Sciences Academy of Lisbon.

Domenico Agostino Vandelli should not be confused with Domenico Vandelli (1691-1754), an Italian cartographer, scientist, and mathematician.

== Contributions to zoology ==
In the field of herpetology he is known for having described the world's largest living turtle, the leatherback sea turtle (Dermochelys coriacea) and an amphisbaenian, Blanus cinereus.

His contributions to zoology have been recognized by another species of Blanus named after him, Blanus vandellii, (although he is cited in the description as Domingos Vandelli).
