= C. angolensis =

C. angolensis may refer to:

- Carrissoa angolensis, a plant species
- Commiphora angolensis, a shrub species

== See also ==
- Angolensis
