= Manuel Póvoa dos Reis =

Portuguese botanist and priest

- Born: 20 October 1907; Eirol, Aveiro
- Died: 4 June 1991 (aged 83); Coimbra
- Occupations: Botanist, priest

Manuel Póvoa dos Reis (20 October 1907 – 4 June 1991) was a Portuguese botanist, phycologist and Roman Catholic priest.

== Career ==
Póvoa dos Reis was ordained priest in 1936, in Coimbra, Portugal, and was nominated canon of the Cathedral of Coimbra in 1957. In addition to his religious work, Póvoa dos Reis maintained an interest in botany, resulting in his nomination as a member of the Broterian Society in 1943, an assistant of the Faculty of Sciences of the University of Coimbra in 1956, and a member of the New York Academy of Sciences. His research focused on freshwater red algae, particularly in the family Batrachospermaceae.
