= Eratigena atrica =

Scientific classification
- Kingdom: Animalia
- Phylum: Arthropoda
- Subphylum: Chelicerata
- Class: Arachnida
- Order: Araneae
- Infraorder: Araneomorphae
- Family: Agelenidae
- Genus: Eratigena
- Species: E. atrica

Binomial name
- Eratigena atrica (C. L. Koch, 1843)

Synonyms
- Philoica atrica (C. L. Koch, 1843); Tegenaria atrica C. L. Koch, 1843; Tegenaria derouetae Denis, 1959; Tegenaria deroueti Dresco, 1957; Tegenaria hibernica O. Pickard-Cambridge, 1891; Tegenaria larva Simon, 1875; Tegenaria nervosa Simon, 1870; Tegenaria praegrandis Fox, 1937; Tegenaria propinqua Locket, 1975

Species of spider

Eratigena atrica is one of the three spider species (along with E. duellica and E. saeva) commonly called giant house spiders. They are large synanthropic spiders native to Europe and introduced to North America. Their bites are not considered dangerous to humans or pets. Giant house spiders have sometimes been considered a single species, collectively called E. atrica, but have been accepted as separate species since 2018 due to small but consistent differences in morphology.

== Description ==
The three species can be distinguished only by microscopic external and internal measurements, in particular for males by the shape of parts of the palpal bulb and for females by the shape of the openings to the spermathecae. The visual description below applies to all three.

The two sexes do not differ in coloration or markings. Its coloration is mainly dark-brown. On its sternum is a lighter marking, with three light spots on each side that form an arrow-like shape pointing toward the head of the spider. The opisthosoma features a lighter middle line with six "spots" on each side. The giant house spider has the same coloration as the domestic house spider, Tegenaria domestica; it has earthy tones of brown and muddy-red or yellow. They also have conspicuously hairy legs, palps, and abdomen. The female body-size can reach 18.5 mm (0.73 in) in length, with males having a slightly smaller body at around 12 to 15 mm (0.5 to 0.6 in) in length. The female leg-span is typically around 45 mm (1.8 in). The leg span of the male is highly variable, with spans between 25 and 75 mm (1.0 and 3.0 in) being common. Adult males have larger pedipalps and a more slender abdomen than females.

Its eight eyes are of equal size and are arranged in two rows. As the eyes contain relatively few visual cells, the giant house spider can probably only distinguish light and dark.

== Nomenclature ==
The genetic study which moved giant house spiders into the new genus Eratigena collapsed several previously defined species into E. atrica broad sense. A 2018 study of genetics and morphology of European giant house spiders found three well-separated morphological groups, leading to restoration of the three separate species. While morphologically distinct, they have little genetic differentiation, suggesting that the species are young.

The genus name Eratigena is an anagram of Tegenaria, the genus from which it was split. The species name atrica means "from the atrium" and may refer to the greenhouse in which the first described specimen was found, or its general tendency to live in houses.

== Distribution ==
Eratigena atrica is native to Europe. The E. atrica specimens used to delineate the three species came from Britain, France, Germany, Belgium, the Netherlands, Switzerland, Austria, Sweden and Finland. It is also found as an invasive species in North America, with populations in British Columbia and extending into Montana, and also in Quebec, Newfoundland, and Nova Scotia. (The giant house spiders found in the US Pacific Northwest are generally E. duellica.)

== Genomics ==
Whole-genome sequencing of a male E. atrica found 22 pairs of chromosomes. There are two different X chromosomes, X_{1} and X_{2}, but no Y chromosomes: males are X_{1} X_{2} and females are X_{1}X_{1} X_{2}X_{2}. This is the most common and probably ancestral form of sex determination in spiders.

While E. saeva and E. duellica have been hybridized in captivity, there is no evidence that E. atrica can hybridize with the others. A survey of an area in England where all three species coexist failed to find any apparent hybrids in the wild.

== Habitat and behavior ==
Giant house spiders, including E. atrica, often live in buildings, favoring hidden locations such as behind crates, around windows, or under furniture. They make flat, irregular webs with a funnel at one end. Despite their large size they are generally inconspicuous, except for males in mating season (late summer and fall) which wander while searching for females. Their bites are not generally considered dangerous to humans or pets.
