= Histopona petrovi =

Scientific classification
- Kingdom: Animalia
- Phylum: Arthropoda
- Subphylum: Chelicerata
- Class: Arachnida
- Order: Araneae
- Infraorder: Araneomorphae
- Family: Agelenidae
- Genus: Histopona
- Species: H. petrovi

Binomial name
- Histopona petrovi Isaia & Mammola, 2019

Species of spider

Histopona petrovi is a species of funnel weaver found in Montenegro.

== Distribution ==
This species is endemic to Montenegro. It is most likely restricted to the Golubova Pećina near Godinje. The species is known only from a single holotype specimen.
