= Histopona egonpretneri =

Scientific classification
- Kingdom: Animalia
- Phylum: Arthropoda
- Subphylum: Chelicerata
- Class: Arachnida
- Order: Araneae
- Infraorder: Araneomorphae
- Family: Agelenidae
- Genus: Histopona
- Species: H. egonpretneri

Binomial name
- Histopona egonpretneri Deeleman-Reinhold, 1983

Species of spider

Histopona egonpretneri is a funnel-web spider species found in Croatia.
