= Eratigena arganoi =

Scientific classification
- Domain: Eukaryota
- Kingdom: Animalia
- Phylum: Arthropoda
- Subphylum: Chelicerata
- Class: Arachnida
- Order: Araneae
- Infraorder: Araneomorphae
- Family: Agelenidae
- Genus: Eratigena
- Species: E. arganoi

Binomial name
- Eratigena arganoi (Brignoli, 1971)

Species of spider

Eratigena arganoi is a species of spider in the genus Eratigena found in Italy.
