= Eratigena barrientosi =

Scientific classification
- Kingdom: Animalia
- Phylum: Arthropoda
- Subphylum: Chelicerata
- Class: Arachnida
- Order: Araneae
- Infraorder: Araneomorphae
- Family: Agelenidae
- Genus: Eratigena
- Species: E. barrientosi

Binomial name
- Eratigena barrientosi (Bolzern et al. 2009)

Synonyms
- Tegenaria barrientosi

Species of spider

Eratigena barrientosi is a funnel-web spider identified in 2009 from Portugal. It was originally named Tegenaria barrientosi but was moved to the newly created genus Eratigena in 2013. Its Portuguese common name is Funileira-de-Barrientos.

== Description ==
The prosoma (cephalothorax) is yellowish brown, and the opisthosoma is light yellowish brown-gray; there are no distinct markings. The prosoma is 2.3-3.3 mm long in males and 2.8-3.5 mm long in females.

== Distribution ==
The species is endemic to Portugal. It may favor damp areas in forests with closed canopies. The two collection locations were a pine plantation in Bairro, Santarém, and the Botanical Garden of the University of Coimbra in Coimbra.

== Behavior ==
E. barrientosi builds a sheet web at ground level to catch small prey, with a tube web at one end as a refuge. Its generation time is one year. Based on the locations where it was found, it may tolerate human presence.

== Similar species ==
E. barrientosi was found to be morphologically similar to E. incognita, also from Portugal, and to E. bucculenta, E. feminea, and E. montigena, a species group found more broadly in the Iberian Peninsula.
