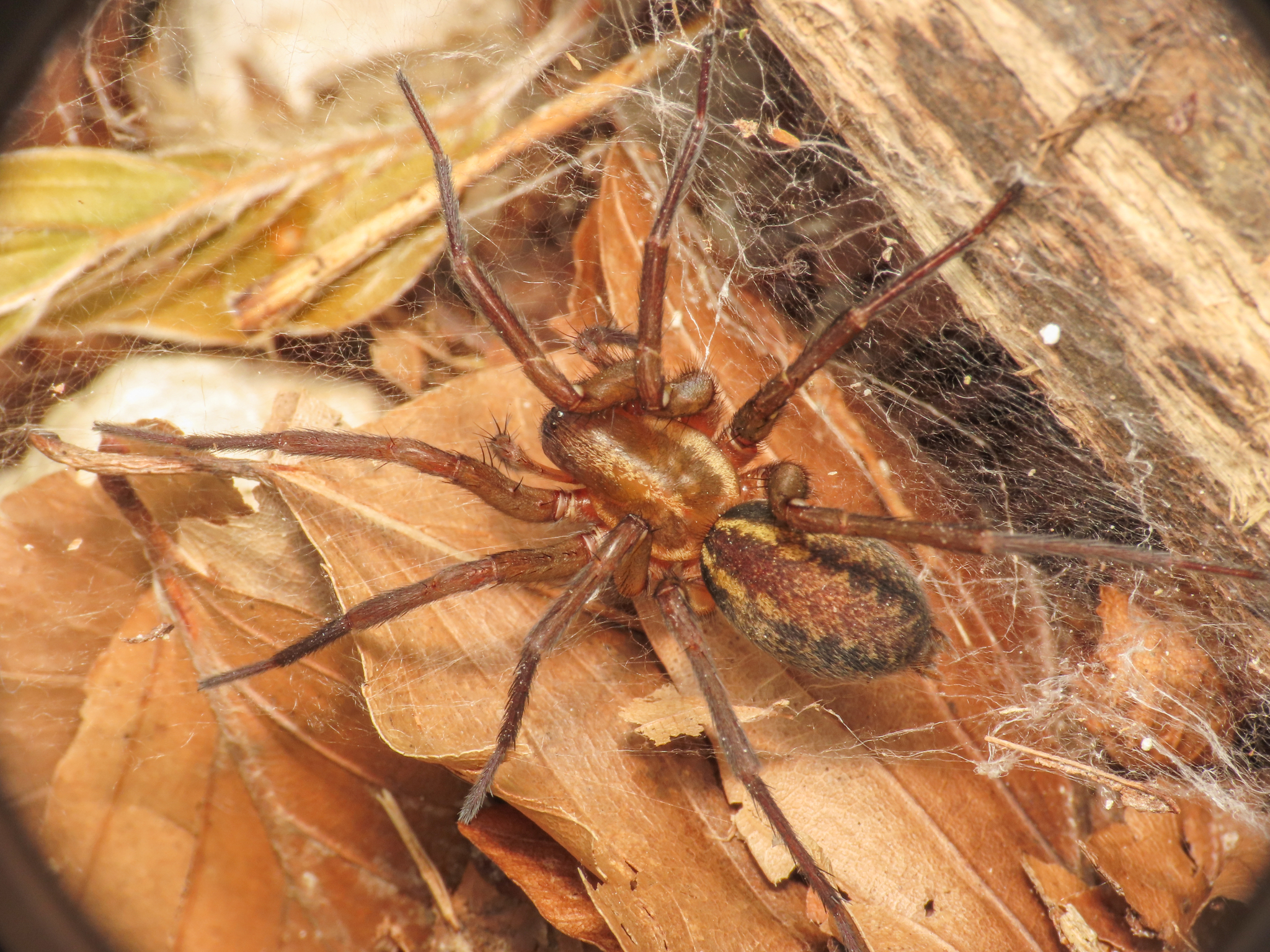
- juvenile female A. ligurica in Italy
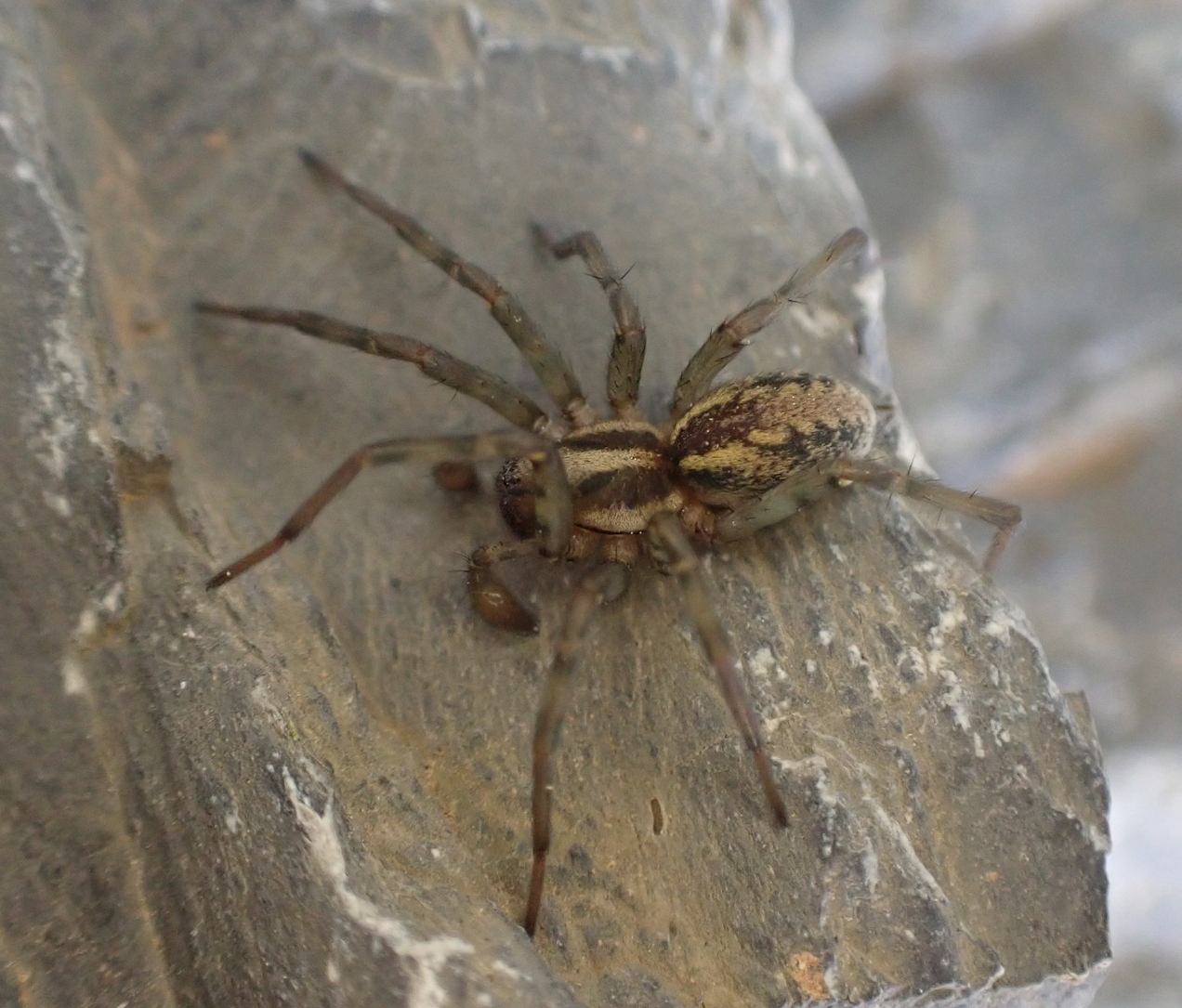
- juvenile male A. ligurica in Italy

Scientific classification
- Kingdom: Animalia
- Phylum: Arthropoda
- Subphylum: Chelicerata
- Class: Arachnida
- Order: Araneae
- Infraorder: Araneomorphae
- Family: Agelenidae
- Genus: Aterigena; Bolzern, Hänggi & Burckhardt, 2010

Type species
- A. ligurica (Simon, 1916)

Species
- 5, see text

= Aterigena =

Genus of spiders

Aterigena is a genus of funnel weavers first described by A. Bolzern, A. Hänggi & D. Burckhardt in 2010. The name is an anagram of Tegenaria. It was created in 2010 for a group of Tegenaria and Malthonica species that formed a clade in a phylogenetic analysis. The genus was later found to be monophyletic, further separating Eratigena from Tegenaria and Malthonica.

== Species ==
As of October 2026 it contains five species:

- Aterigena aculeata (Wang, 1992) – China
- Aterigena aliquoi (Brignoli, 1971) – Sicily
- Aterigena aspromontensis Bolzern, Hänggi & Burckhardt, 2010 – Italy
- Aterigena ligurica (Simon, 1916) (type) – France, Italy
- Aterigena soriculata (Simon, 1873) – Corsica, Sardinia
