= Eratigena balearica =

Scientific classification
- Domain: Eukaryota
- Kingdom: Animalia
- Phylum: Arthropoda
- Subphylum: Chelicerata
- Class: Arachnida
- Order: Araneae
- Infraorder: Araneomorphae
- Family: Agelenidae
- Genus: Eratigena
- Species: E. balearica

Binomial name
- Eratigena balearica (Brignoli, 1978)

Species of spider

Eratigena balearica is a species of spider in the genus Eratigena.

== Info ==
Distribution: Balearic Islands
