= Histopona luxurians =

Scientific classification
- Kingdom: Animalia
- Phylum: Arthropoda
- Subphylum: Chelicerata
- Class: Arachnida
- Order: Araneae
- Infraorder: Araneomorphae
- Family: Agelenidae
- Genus: Histopona
- Species: H. luxurians

Binomial name
- Histopona luxurians (Kulczynski, 1897)

Species of spider

Histopona luxurians is a funnel-web spider species found in Austria and South-Eastern Europe.
