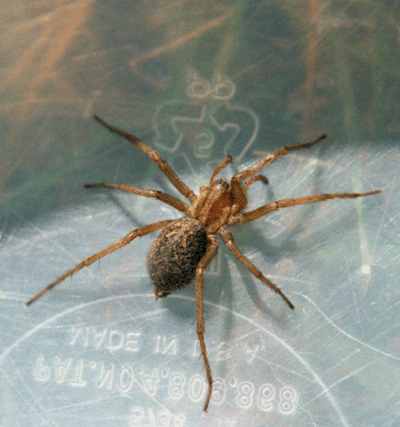
- Female hobo spider

Scientific classification
- Kingdom: Animalia
- Phylum: Arthropoda
- Subphylum: Chelicerata
- Class: Arachnida
- Order: Araneae
- Infraorder: Araneomorphae
- Family: Agelenidae
- Genus: Eratigena
- Species: E. agrestis

Binomial name
- Eratigena agrestis (Walckenaer, 1802)
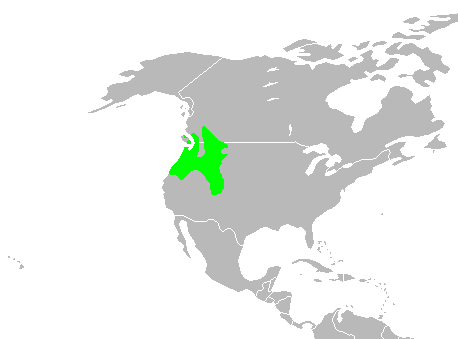
- Distribution in North America in green

Synonyms
- Aranea agrestis Walckenaer, 1802; Tegenaria agrestis (Walckenaer, 1841); Philoica agrestis (Karsch, 1873); Tegenaria rhaetica Thorell, 1875; Tegenaria magnacava Exline, 1936; Tegenaria osellai Brignoli, 1971; Tegenaria trinacriae Brignoli, 1971

= Hobo spider =

Species of spider

The hobo spider (Eratigena agrestis, formerly Tegenaria agrestis) is a member of the family of spiders known colloquially as funnel web spiders, but not to be confused with the Australian funnel-web spider. Individuals construct a funnel-shaped structure of silk sheeting and lie in wait at the small end of the funnel for prey insects to blunder onto their webs. Hobo spiders sometimes build their webs in or around human habitations. Despite past claims, there is no clear evidence that the hobo spider has venom that is dangerous to humans.

== Taxonomy ==
The species was first described in 1802 by naturalist Charles Athanase Walckenaer as Aranea agrestis, in reference to its western European habitat in fields, woods, and under rocks. In 1841, Walckenaer transferred the species to the genus Tegenaria. In 2013, Tegenaria was split up, and the hobo spider was transferred to a new genus Eratigena, an anagram of Tegenaria.

== Identification ==
Spiders, including the hobo spider, vary considerably in appearance, and identification can be difficult. The hobo spider is 7–14 mm in body length, and brownish in color. Identification relies on an examination of the spider's anatomy. Like many species of spider the positive identification of Eratigena agrestis requires microscopic examination of the epigynum and palpal bulb (the female and male sex organs respectively) and is best done by an arachnologist. However, the following characteristics identify hobo spiders among other species with a similar general appearance:

- Hobo spiders lack the colored bands found on many spiders of the family Agelenidae where the leg joints meet.
- The abdomen has chevron (V-shaped) patterns (possibly many of them) down the middle, with the chevrons pointing towards the head.
- Hobo spiders have a light stripe running down the middle of the sternum. If the spider instead has three or four pairs of light spots on the lateral portions of the sternum, then it is one of the other two related Eratigena species. However absence of spots is not conclusive proof that the spider is a hobo spider, since the spots on other Eratigena species may be extremely faint and not readily visible.
- Hobo spiders do not have two distinct longitudinal dark stripes on the top side of the cephalothorax, instead showing indistinct or diffused patterns. Washington spiders with distinct dark stripes include spiders from the genera Agelenopsis and Hololena and possibly some wolf spiders.

== Distribution and habitat ==
Eratigena agrestis is distributed from Europe to Central Asia, and is also found in western North America, in the Pacific Northwest and Great Basin. It is recorded in the checklist of Danish spider species, and is present on the small artificial island of Peberholm, probably having been carried there by trains.

It is a resident of fields, avoiding human habitations occupied by major competitors, particularly the giant house spider (Eratigena atrica), which is a common resident of houses and other man-made structures in Europe. As a result, human contacts with the hobo spider are uncommon in Europe. Hobo spiders build a horizontal, trampoline-like web near brick walls or wood piles where the spider has shelter and awaits prey.

The hobo spider lays its eggs in September and they hatch during late spring. After the male hobo spider mates it dies.

== Bite effects ==
Although the toxicity and aggression of the hobo spider have long been debated, there is little evidence that the hobo spider is a dangerously venomous species. The CDC reported case studies in the 1990s claiming that the hobo spider bite caused isolated cases of necrosis in people, but as of 2017, the CDC no longer lists the hobo spider among venomous species. In Canada, there is no evidence that hobo spider bites cause skin necrosis. Some bites reportedly from the closely related desert grass spider, Agelenopsis aperta, may have been inaccurately reported and may have actually been from the hobo spider.

== Bibliography ==
- Binford, G.J. (July 2001). "An analysis of geographic and intersexual chemical variation in venoms of the spider Tegenaria agrestis (Agelenidae)". Toxicon. 39 (7): 955–68. doi:10.1016/S0041-0101(00)00234-8. PMID 11223084.
- Isbister, G.K.; Gray, M.R. (August 2003). "White-tail spider bite: a prospective study of 130 definite bites by Lampona species". The Medical Journal of Australia. 179 (4): 199–202. doi:10.5694/j.1326-5377.2003.tb05499.x. PMID 12914510.
- Vetter, R.S. (2001). "Hobo spider". Univ. Calif. Pest Notes #7488.
