= Julio Augusto Henriques =

Portuguese botanist and professor

Júlio Augusto Henriques
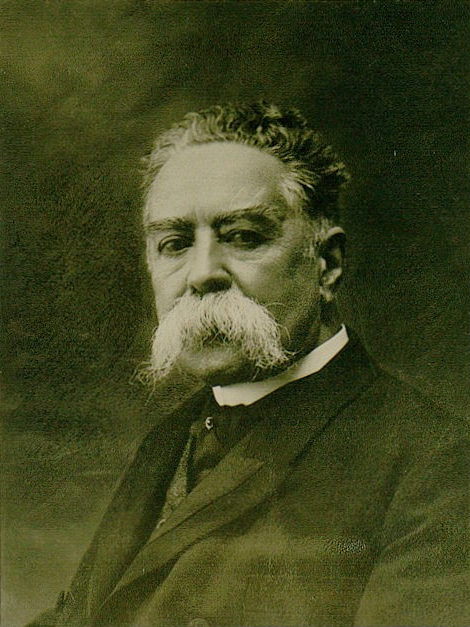
- Julio Augusto Henriques
- Born: 15 January 1838; Arco de Baúlhe, in the Braga district, Portugal
- Died: 15 January 1928 (aged 90); Coimbra, Portugal
- Education: University of Coimbra
- Known for: Taxonomy; Botany
- Awards: Honorary doctorate of University of Uppsala
- Scientific career
- Fields: Botany
- Workplaces: University of Coimbra
- Author abbrev. (botany): Henriq.

Júlio Augusto Henriques (15 January 1838 - 15 January 1928) was a Portuguese botanist and professor at the University of Coimbra. He developed the Herbarium of the University and Coimbra Botanical Garden. He also founded the Broterian Society, which brought together various scientists botanists, geologists and naturalists. He was a large admirer of the work of Charles Darwin. He also wrote many articles about the flora of Portugal.

== Biography ==
Julio Augusto Henriques

Henriques was born on 15 January 1838, in the parish of Arco de Baúlhe.

In 1853, he married Zulmira Angelina de Magalhães Lima.

He went to school in the city of Braga. In 1854, he trained to become a lawyer at College of São Bento in Coimbra, (following his fathers wishes). He completed his law course in 1859, but then enrolled on a second college course in Philosophy at the University of Coimbra. After gaining a bachelor's degree in Philosophy, he went on to obtain a Ph.D. doctorate.

Henriques was a supporter of Darwinism. His final thesis in 1865, was entitled As espécies são mudáveis? (translated as Are species modifiable?) was a defence of Charles Darwin's theory of evolution.

In 1866, he became a tutor in Philosophy at the University of Coimbra. He soon became secretary of the Philosophy Faculty, which he held until 1873. In 1869, he became a substitute lecturer in botany, agriculture, zoology, chemistry and mineralogy.

He most favoured botany and the plant sciences, and then in 1873, this new found passion lead to him becoming head of the Botany and Agriculture. This also meant being in charge of the university botanical garden. Using other botanical gardens in Europe as his guide, he achieved new funding for the department. He acquired new laboratory resources, increased fieldwork opportunities for his botany students. He re-organised the books, to create a library, then he re-organised the botanical specimens to create a herbarium. This new plant collection attracted others, including a vast number of specimens from the German collector Heinrich Moritz Willkomm (who collected in Spain and Portugal). He also added to the Botanical Garden, by collaborating (via exchanges of plants and seeds) with other botanical gardens and plant organisations.

This invigoration within the botany department, turned Coimbra into a national centre for studying Portuguese flora.

In 1876, he wrote O Jardim Botanico, published by University Press.

In 1880, he was still in contact with Heinrich Moritz Willkomm, with several letters being sent between the two botanists.

In 1880, he founded the Sociedade Broteriana, which was named in honour after Félix Avelar Brotero (a botanist and founder of the Botanical Garden. The botanical society brought together plant enthusiasts from all over Portugal, to write various articles in the society's bulletins. and disseminate information about plants throughout the country. Under the control of him and Adolpho Frederico Möller the society started in 1880 to publish and distribute annual series of specimens which resemble exsiccatae by printed labels with title and numbered species name, starting with Flora Lusitanica (Soc. Brot. 1. anno) and ending with Flora Lusitanica (Soc. Brot. 18. anno) and Flora Lusitanica (Soc. Brot. 19. anno).

Henriques became to travel all over the country to collect more specimens for the University and the herbarium. He also started classifying and identifying the herbarium collection (including Willkomm's and his) specimens.

He produced many articles and publications on the fungi, lichens, algae and vascular plants (such as Amaryllidaceae, Poaceae and Plantaginaceae) of Portugal and produced a regional flora of the Mondego Basin.

In 1882, Henriques published an article Carlos Darwin, which is devoted to Charles Darwin's life and works.

In 1883, he published Expedição scientifica á Serra da Estrella, in Secção de botanica, based on a botanical exploration taken of Serra da Estrela (Star Mountain range) in 1881. It listed 716 plants (including 600 vascular species).

In 1886, he published Uma excursão botanica na Serra do Caramullo in Bol. Soc Broteriana, various geological, topographical and flora observations from explorations taken in June 1884.

In 1886, he published Contribuição para o estudo da flora d'Africa: Flora de S. Thome about flora of the Portuguese commonwealth in Africa, he collected in São Tomé and Príncipe as well, and is responsible for publishing the first flora of these islands in 1886. He was also interested in the development of agriculture on São Tomé and Príncipe and in Angola, publishing instructions on successful cultivation of certain crop species (particularly quinine for its protective qualities against malaria), and sending over thousands of species of potential agricultural interest.

In 1886 he started to issue the exsiccata Flora Lusitanica exsiccata Herb. Hort. Bot. Conimbricensis.

In 1889, he published Lecanora newtoniana (a species of Lichen) in Ins. Guin.: 17 (1889).

He studied specimens from plant collectors, Frenchman Jules Alexandre Daveau (during 1852-1929) and M. Ferreira. (during 1860-1920).

In 1901, he published De Macieira até Castro Daire in Bol. Soc Broteriana various geological, topographical and flora details of various regions in articles.

Henriques did not hold a large number of administrative positions, preferring instead to concentrate on his teaching and running the gardens.

In 1907, the University of Uppsala (in Sweden) awarded him an honorary doctorate but, as a particularly humble man, he often refused other recognition's.

In 1915, he wrote a letter on 5 January from Jardim Botânico, Coimbra to Sir William Abbott Herdman, the letter is now stored by the Natural History Museum Archives in London.

In 1917, he wrote A Ilha de S. Tomé, sob o ponto de vista histórico-natural e agrícola.

He also wrote Plantas Da Borracha E Da Gutta-Percha (Portuguese Edition). It was re-published in paperback form on 27 January 2012.

He is the botanical author of Iris boissieri.

After his death in 1928, several articles Flora vascular de Transcow were published in Anais da Faculdade de Sciências do Porto in 1936 by Gonçalo Sampaio. This was a brief annotated list of 405 species of vascular plants collected by Henriques in July 1908.

In 1955, Portugaliae acta biologica: Sistemática, ecologia, biogeografia e paleontologia, Volumes 6-8 was also published.

In 1978, Sociedade Broteriana also published the letters sent between Julio Henriques and Heinrich Moritz Willkomm.

== Other sources ==
- R. T. Palian, 1849, "Júlio Henriques: Botânico e Mestre (esboço vigoráfico)", Portugaliae acta biologica, vol. Julio Henriques: V-XXXV.
