= Botanical Garden of the University of Coimbra =

Botanic garden in Portugal

Jardim Botânico da Universidade de Coimbra
- Botanical Garden of the University of Coimbra
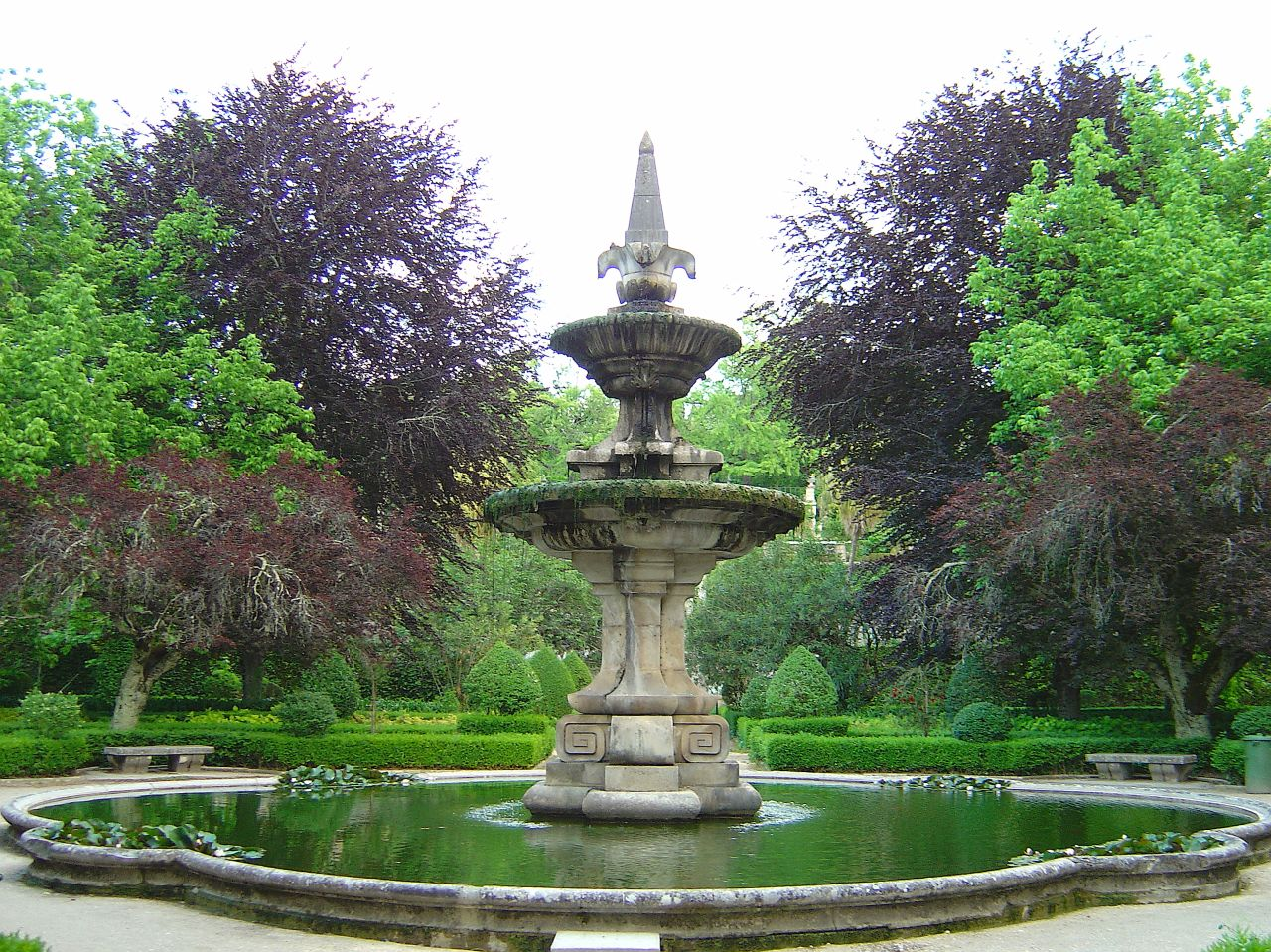
- View of the Botanical Garden of the University of Coimbra.
- Interactive map of Jardim Botânico da Universidade de Coimbra
- Type: Botanical garden
- Location: Calçada Martim de Freitas, 3000-456, Coimbra, Portugal
- Coordinates: 40.2058°N 8.4214°W
- Opened: 1772
- Status: Open year round
- Website: Official website

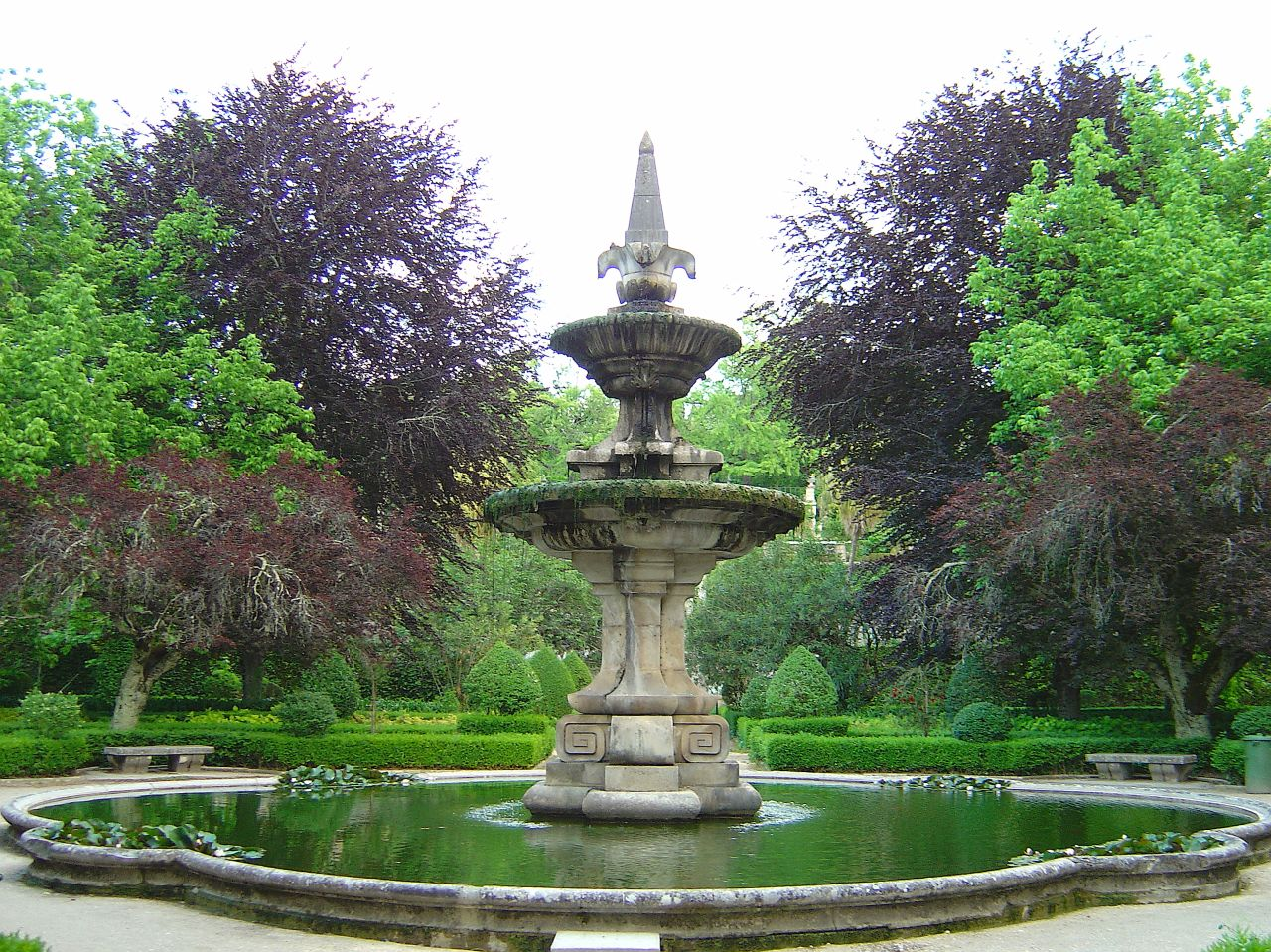

The Botanical Garden of the University of Coimbra (Portuguese: Jardim Botânico da Universidade de Coimbra or simply Jardim Botânico) is a botanical garden in Coimbra, Portugal. In 2013, UNESCO declared the university a World Heritage Site, noting its architecture, unique culture and traditions, and historical role, including the botanical garden.

== History ==
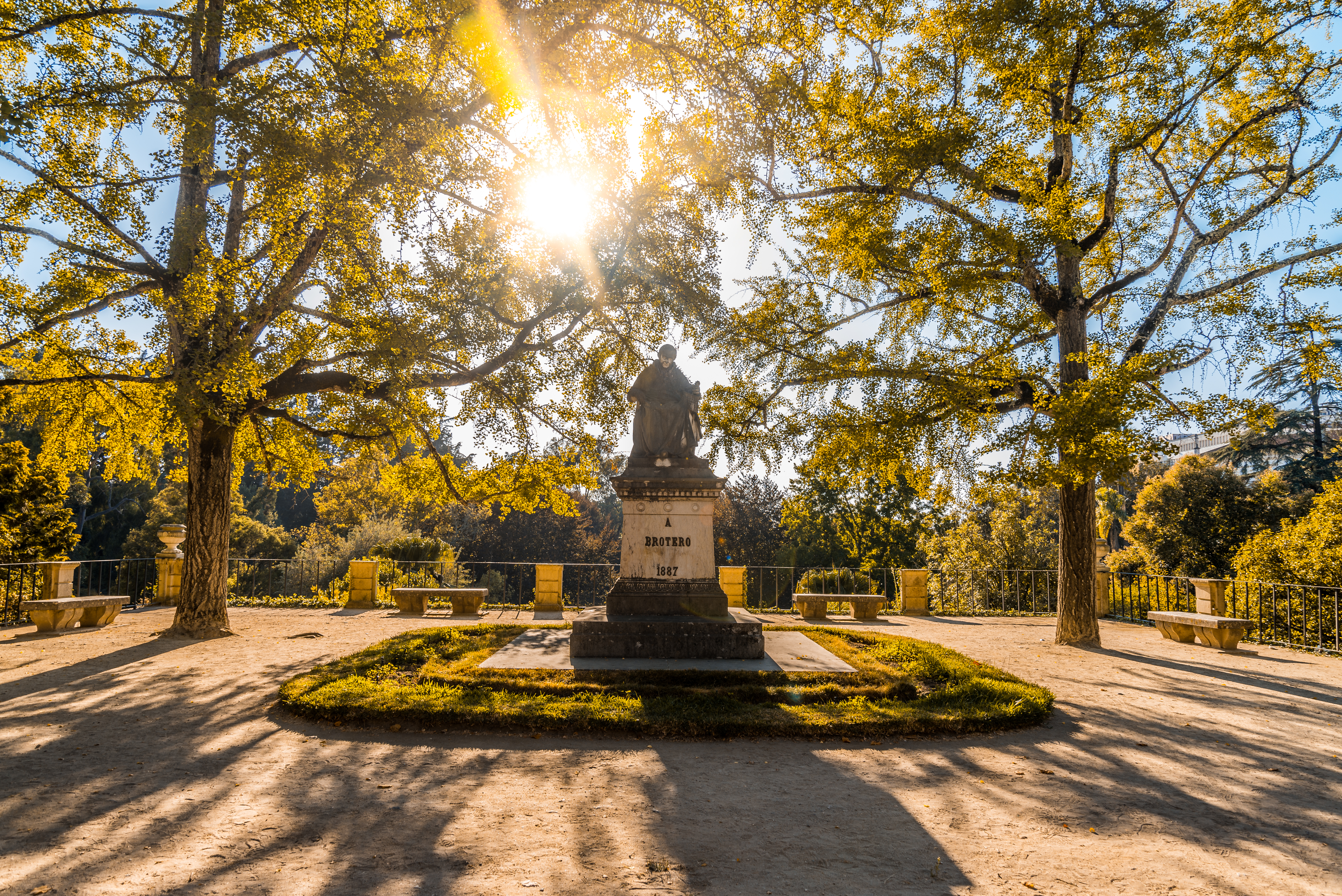
Homage to Avelar Brotero.

It was founded in 1772 by Sebastião José de Carvalho e Melo (the Marquis of Pombal). The location for the Hortus Botanicus—part of the farm of S. Bento's College in the Ursulinas Valley—was chosen by the vice-chancellor of the University of Coimbra (Francisco de Lemos). Domingos Vandelli was the first supervisor for the orientation of the garden, followed in 1791 by Félix Avelar Brotero, professor of Botany and Agriculture.

The botanist Luís Wittnich Carrisso, from the year he became a full professor in 1918 until his death in 1937, enriched the Garden with exotic African plants, most of them originating in Angola. He developed relations with similar gardens, promoting exchanges of seeds and plants, reinforcing the offer in the publication of Index Seminum, which, at the time, was considered one of the six best in the world, given its variety and scientific rigor. He restored the greenhouses and modernized their heating, where he started to grow a greater number of exotic plants, including Victoria amazonica. He introduced changes in the organization of the Garden, so that it could lend itself to perform its functions: to educate the public from the scientific, floricultural and landscape points of view; to support the teaching of Botany, in the preparation of students in the fields of taxonomy (vascular plants, non-vascular plants), anatomy, physiology, ecology and pharmacology; and have facilities where researchers can keep the materials necessary for their research activities. He made more space available to the public and planted a large number of trees, properly identified and labeled with plaques, with their respective scientific and common names, as well as the geographic distribution of the species. He also made space available for the installation of nurseries and founded the Escola das Monocotiledóneas.

== Area ==
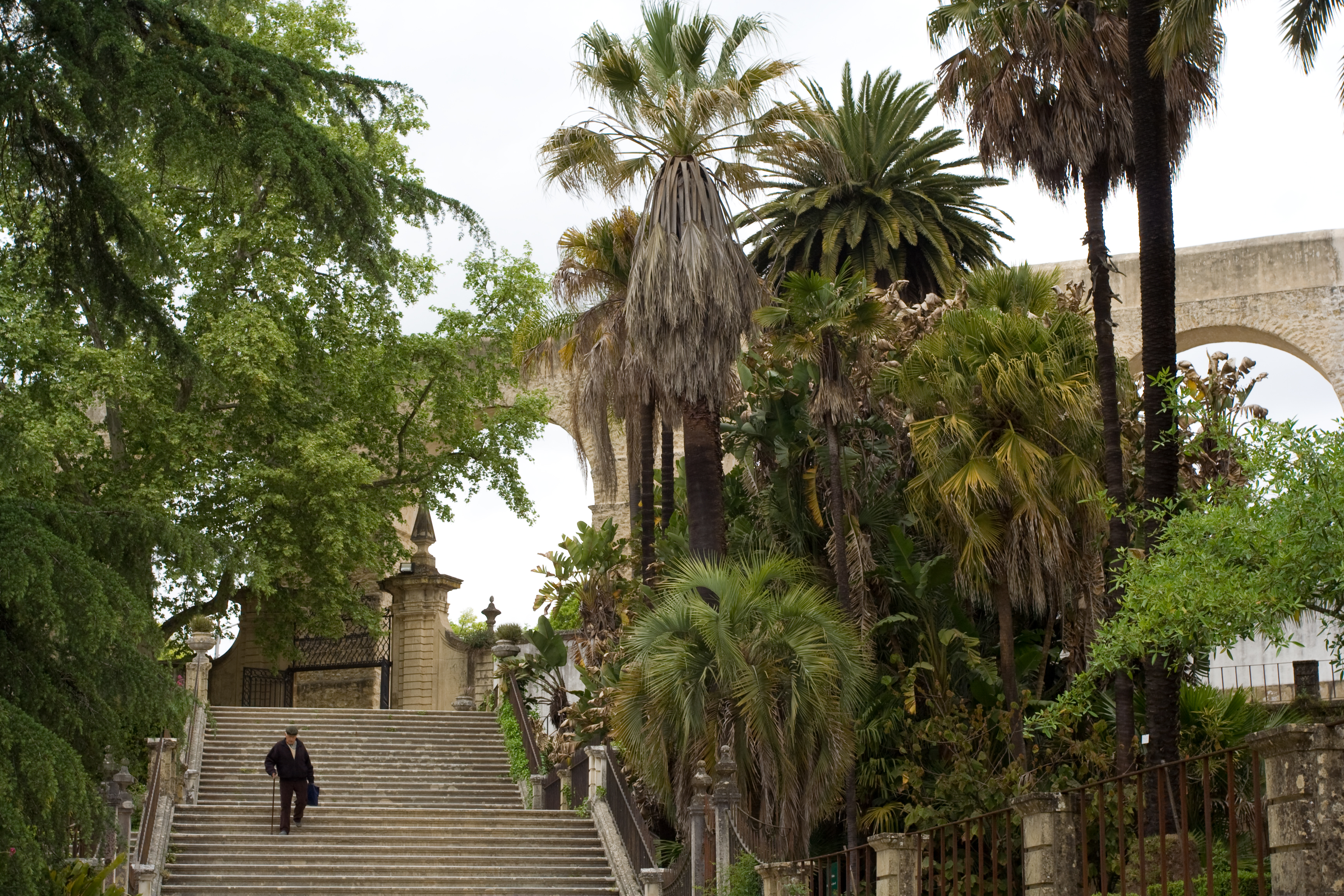

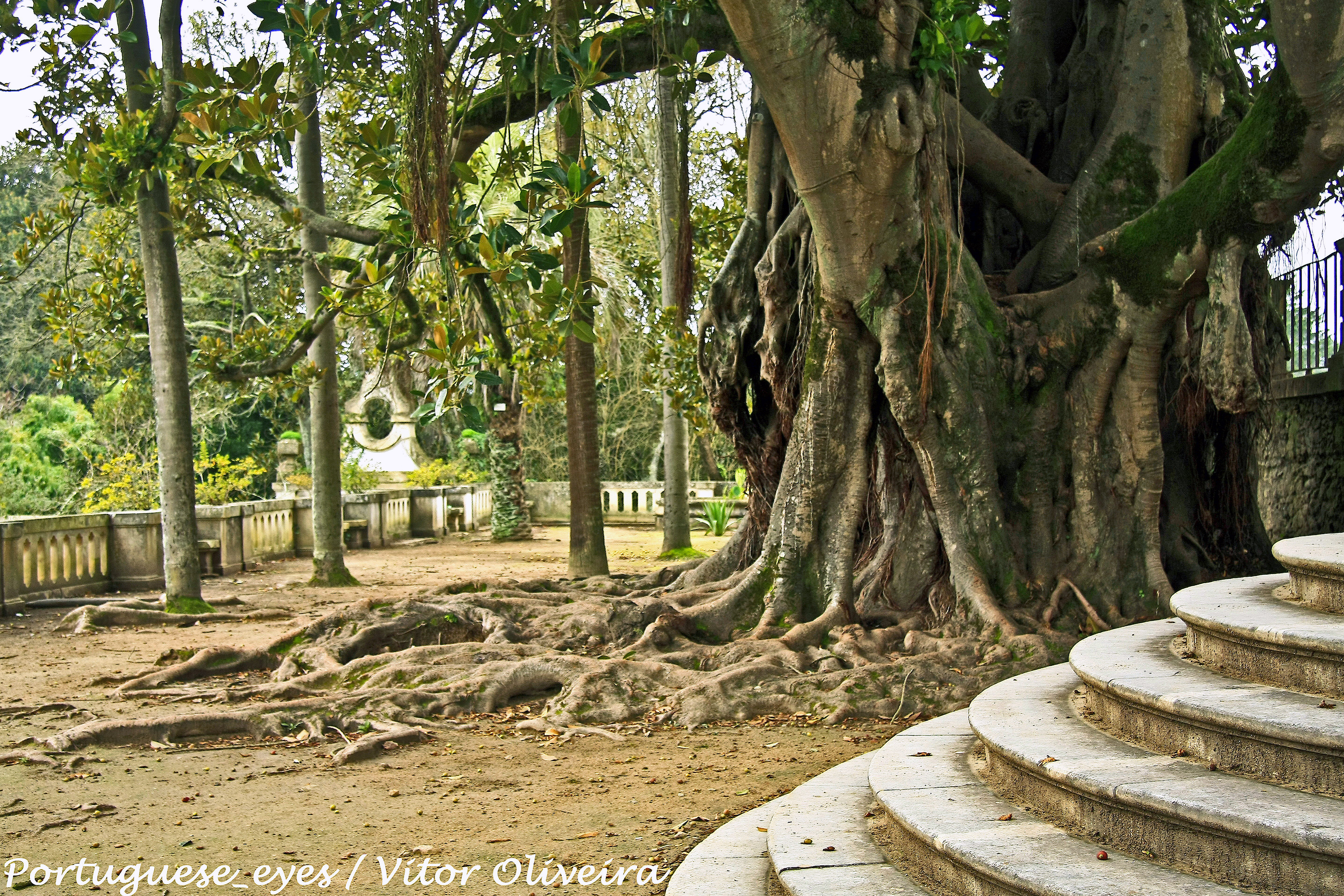
Notable Moreton Bay fig

The garden occupies 13 hectares and can be divided in two parts.

The first part, located at the top of the valley, constitutes the most formal area and it is divided in terraces. The lower terrace, known as the Quadrado Central (The Central Square), is the most primitive part of the garden and is decorated like European gardens of the 18th century. In this terrace, adorned with a fountain from the 1940s, some trees planted during the time of Brotero can still be seen, such as: Cryptomeria japonica, Cunninghamia sinensis and Erythrina crista-galli. On the other terraces are:

a) The Order Beds, where plants, taxonomically grouped, are cultivated for the use of botany students and for exchange with similar institutions all over the world (Index Seminum et Sporarum).

b) The Greenhouses, where tropical and sub-tropical plants develop under different conditions of temperature and humidity, according to their various needs, among which Victoria cruziana is one of the best known.

The second part of the garden, including the valley where once a small stream flowed, is the arboretum, usually known as Mata of the Botanical Garden. The arboretum includes the Monocotyledoneae collection, a bamboo forest and dense vegetation with exotic trees, a collection of 51 species of Eucalyptus, and a notable specimen of Ficus macrophylla.

The Department of Botany of the Faculty of Sciences and Technology of the University of Coimbra (Instituto Botânico Dr. Júlio Henriques), of which the garden is a component, includes the library, the herbarium, the museum and the laboratories dating from the period of Prof. Júlio Henriques' direction (end of 19th century). Botany classes were first held at the natural history museum; they were later transferred, by Avelar Brotero's initiative, to a house built in the garden for that purpose but later demolished.

== Fauna ==
The Botanical Garden shelters several species of birds in their natural environment. The brown squirrel (Sciurus vulgaris) has been part of the ecosystem since it was introduced in June 1994. The six pairs of squirrels which were the initial population have adapted and bred successfully.

The funnel-web spider Eratigena barrientosi was initially described in 2009 based in part on specimens found in the Garden.
