= Jules Alexandre Daveau =

French botanist (1852–1929)

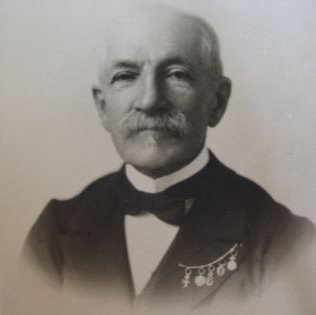
Jules Alexandre Daveau (1852-1929)

Jules Alexandre Daveau (29 February 1852, Argenteuil – 24 August 1929) was a French botanist known for his investigations of Portuguese flora.

As a teenager he began work as an apprentice gardener at the Muséum national d'histoire naturelle in Paris. In 1875, he was sent on a botanical expedition to Cyrenaica. He collected specimens for a Portuguese botanist Julio Augusto Henriques on Berlenga Grande Island, Portugal.

From 1876 to 1893 he served as head gardener of the botanical gardens in Lisbon. Afterwards, he was curator in the herbarium and botanical garden in Montpellier.

Plants with the specific epithet of daveauanus are named after Daveau, an example being: Erigeron daveauanus.

== Partial list of publications ==
- Aperçu sur la végétation de l'Alemtejo et de l'Algarve, 1882 - Overview on the vegetation of Alemtejo and the Algarve.
- Euphorbiacées du Portugal, 1885 - Euphorbiaceae of Portugal.
- Cistinées du Portugal, 1886 - Cistineae of Portugal.
- Plumbaginées du Portugal, 1889 - Plumbaginaceae of Portugal.
- Cypéracées du Portugal, 1892 - Cyperaceae of Portugal.
