= Histopona bidens =

Scientific classification
- Kingdom: Animalia
- Phylum: Arthropoda
- Subphylum: Chelicerata
- Class: Arachnida
- Order: Araneae
- Infraorder: Araneomorphae
- Family: Agelenidae
- Genus: Histopona
- Species: H. bidens

Binomial name
- Histopona bidens (Absolon & Kratochvil, 1933)

Species of spider

Histopona bidens is a funnel-web spider species found in Croatia and North Macedonia.
