= Broterian Society =

- Sociedade Broteriana
- Named after: Félix de Avelar Brotero
- Formation: 1880; 146 years ago
- Founder: Julio Augusto Henriques
- Type: Botanical scientific society
- Purpose: To promote the development of botanical studies, particularly that of floristics, in Portugal
- Location: Portugal
- Main organ: Boletim da Sociedade Broteriana - Biblioteca Digital de Botânica (Universidade de Coimbra)

The Broterian Society (Portuguese: Sociedade Broteriana) is a botanical scientific society, the first of its kind in Portugal, established in 1880 by Júlio Henriques, professor of Botany and Agriculture at the University of Coimbra, to promote the development of botanical studies, particularly that of floristics, in Portugal. It is thus named after eminent naturalist Félix de Avelar Brotero, author of the first lengthy description of native Portuguese plants, Flora Lusitanica, in 1804.

Between 1881 and 1901 the society published and distributed annual series of specimens which superficially resemble exsiccatae by printed labels with title and numbered species name, starting with Flora Lusitanica (Soc. Brot. 1. anno) and ending with Flora Lusitanica (Soc. Brot. 18. anno) and Flora Lusitanica (Soc. Brot. 19. anno).

It has continuously published the Boletim da Sociedade Broteriana (Bol. Soc. Brot.), a scientific journal, since its inception; the first volume was published in 1883.
