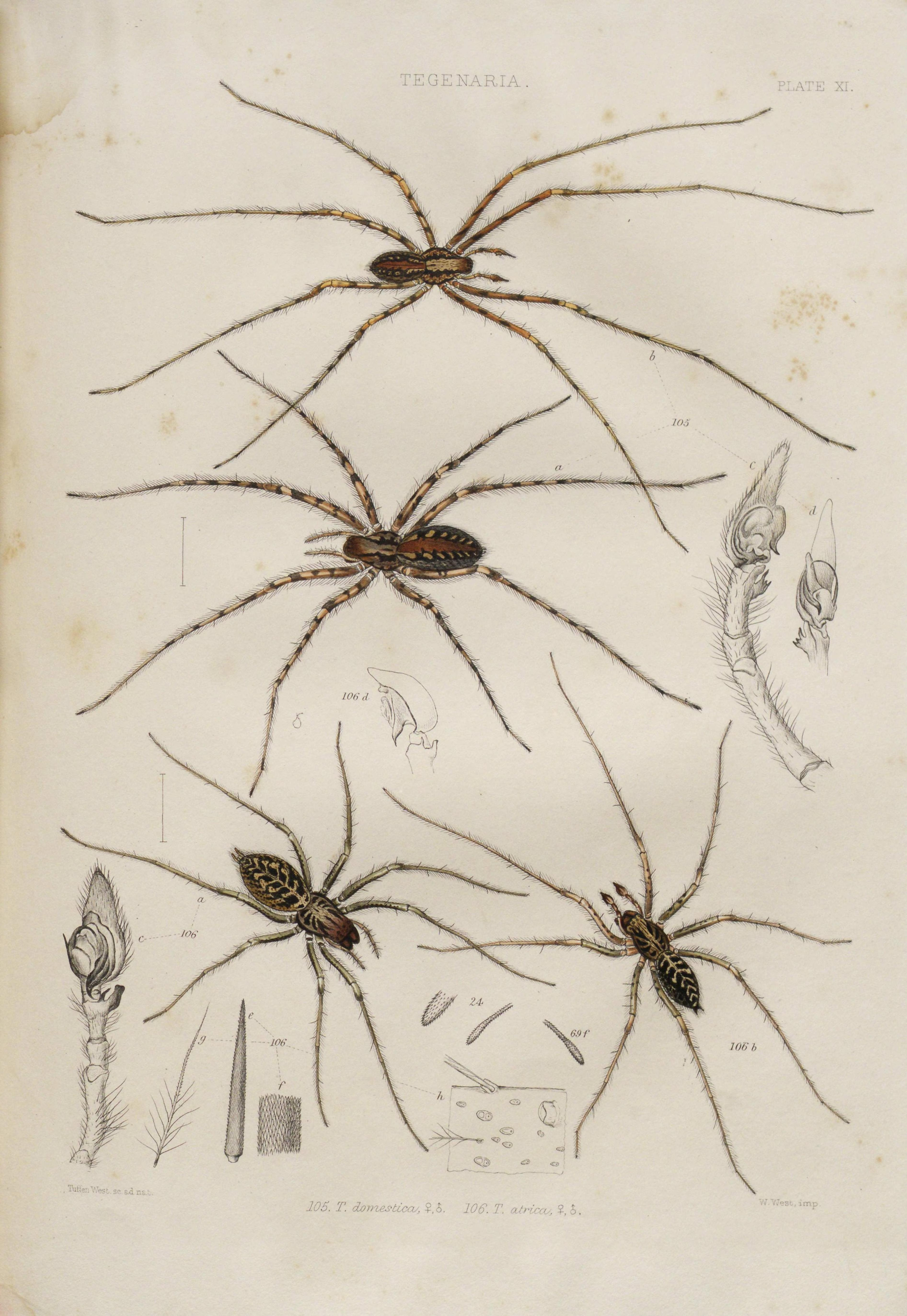

Scientific classification
- Kingdom: Animalia
- Phylum: Arthropoda
- Subphylum: Chelicerata
- Class: Arachnida
- Order: Araneae
- Infraorder: Araneomorphae
- Family: Agelenidae
- Genus: Eratigena
- Species: E. duellica

Binomial name
- Eratigena duellica (Simon, 1875)

Synonyms
- Tegenaria duellica Simon, 1875; Tegenaria gigantea Chamberlin & Ivie, 1935; Tegenaria propinqua Locket, 1975

= Eratigena duellica =

Species of spider

Eratigena duellica, the giant house spider, is a species of funnel weaver in the spider family Agelenidae. Originally from Europe, it is also found in British Columbia, Canada, as well as Washington and Oregon in the United States. The related species E. atrica and E. saeva are also called giant house spiders.

Eratigena atrica broad sense was transferred from the genus Tegenaria in 2013. This spider was considered the same species as Eratigena atrica until 2018, when E. duellica, E. saeva, and E. atrica were restored as separate species based on small but consistent differences in morphology.
