= Histopona dubia =

Scientific classification
- Kingdom: Animalia
- Phylum: Arthropoda
- Subphylum: Chelicerata
- Class: Arachnida
- Order: Araneae
- Infraorder: Araneomorphae
- Family: Agelenidae
- Genus: Histopona
- Species: H. dubia

Binomial name
- Histopona dubia (Absolon & Kratochvil, 1933)

Species of spider

Histopona dubia is a funnel-web spider species found in Croatia, Montenegro, and Bosnia-Herzegovina.
