= Histopona tranteevi =

Scientific classification
- Kingdom: Animalia
- Phylum: Arthropoda
- Subphylum: Chelicerata
- Class: Arachnida
- Order: Araneae
- Infraorder: Araneomorphae
- Family: Agelenidae
- Genus: Histopona
- Species: H. tranteevi

Binomial name
- Histopona tranteevi Deltshev, 1978

Species of spider

Histopona tranteevi is a funnel-web spider species found in Bulgaria.
