= Carrissoa =

Scientific classification
- Kingdom: Plantae
- Clade: Tracheophytes
- Clade: Angiosperms
- Clade: Eudicots
- Clade: Rosids
- Order: Fabales
- Family: Fabaceae
- Subfamily: Faboideae
- Tribe: Phaseoleae
- Subtribe: Cajaninae
- Genus: Carrissoa; Baker f. (1933)
- Species: C. angolensis

Binomial name
- Carrissoa angolensis Baker f. (1933)

Genus of legumes

Carrissoa is a genus of flowering plants in the family Fabaceae. It belongs to the subfamily Faboideae. The genus has a single species, Carrissoa angolensis, a subshrub endemic to Angola. It grows in seasonally-dry tropical open bushland and scrub and along watercourses, and forms woody rootstocks in fire-prone environments.

The genus takes its name from Portuguese botanist Luís Wittnich Carrisso.
