= Malthonica =

Scientific classification
- Kingdom: Animalia
- Phylum: Arthropoda
- Subphylum: Chelicerata
- Class: Arachnida
- Order: Araneae
- Infraorder: Araneomorphae
- Family: Agelenidae
- Genus: Malthonica; Simon, 1898

Type species
- M. lusitanica Simon, 1898

Species
- 4, see text

Genus of spiders

Malthonica is a genus of funnel weavers first described by Eugène Simon in 1898. Many of its species were transferred to Aterigena and Tegenaria in 2010.

== Species ==
As of October 2026 it contains four species:

- Malthonica africana Simon & Fage, 1922 – East Africa
- Malthonica daedali Brignoli, 1980 – Greece (Crete)
- Malthonica lusitanica Simon, 1898 – Portugal to France
- Malthonica oceanica Barrientos & Cardoso, 2007 – Portugal
