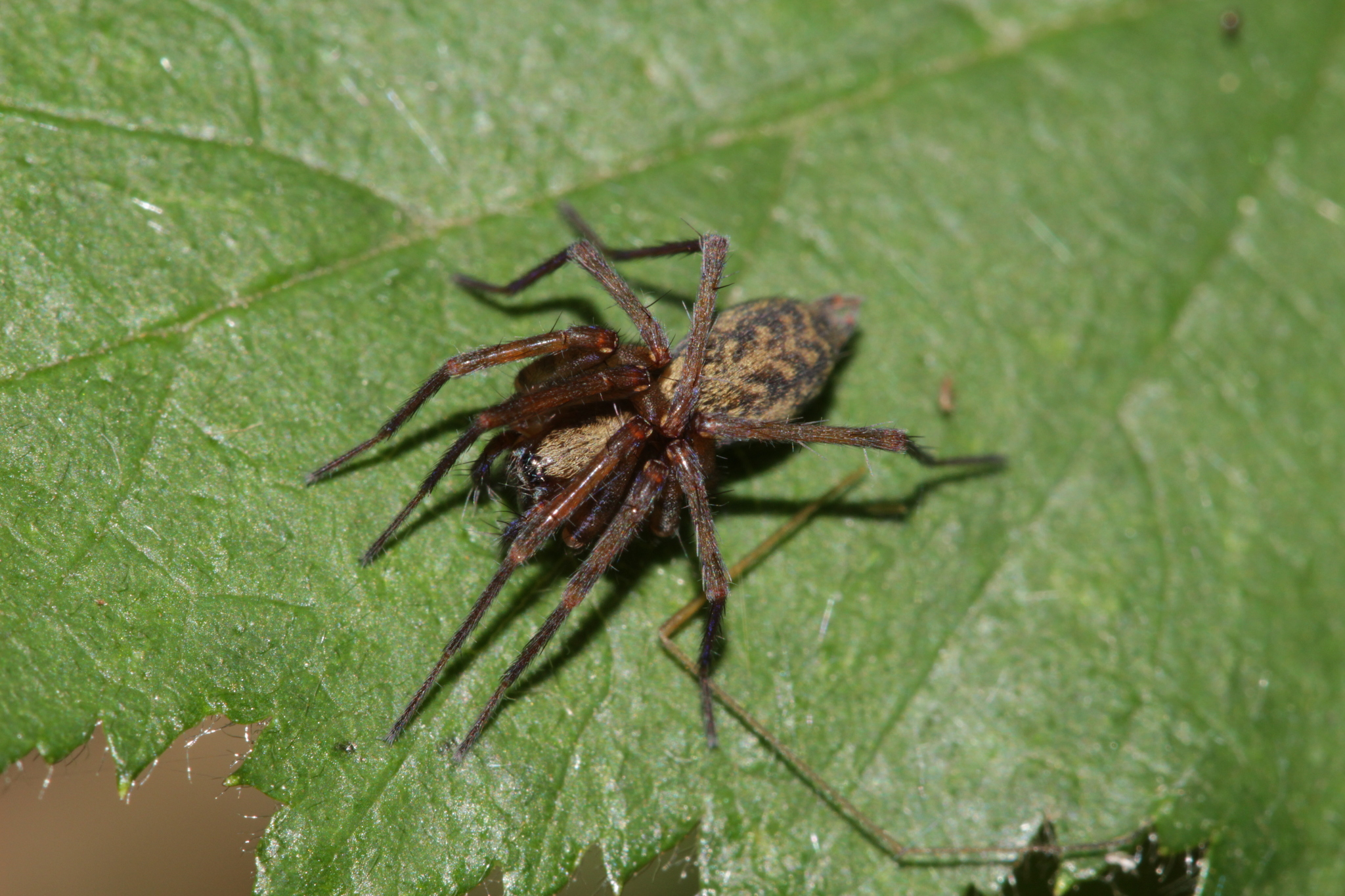
- H. torpida in Austria
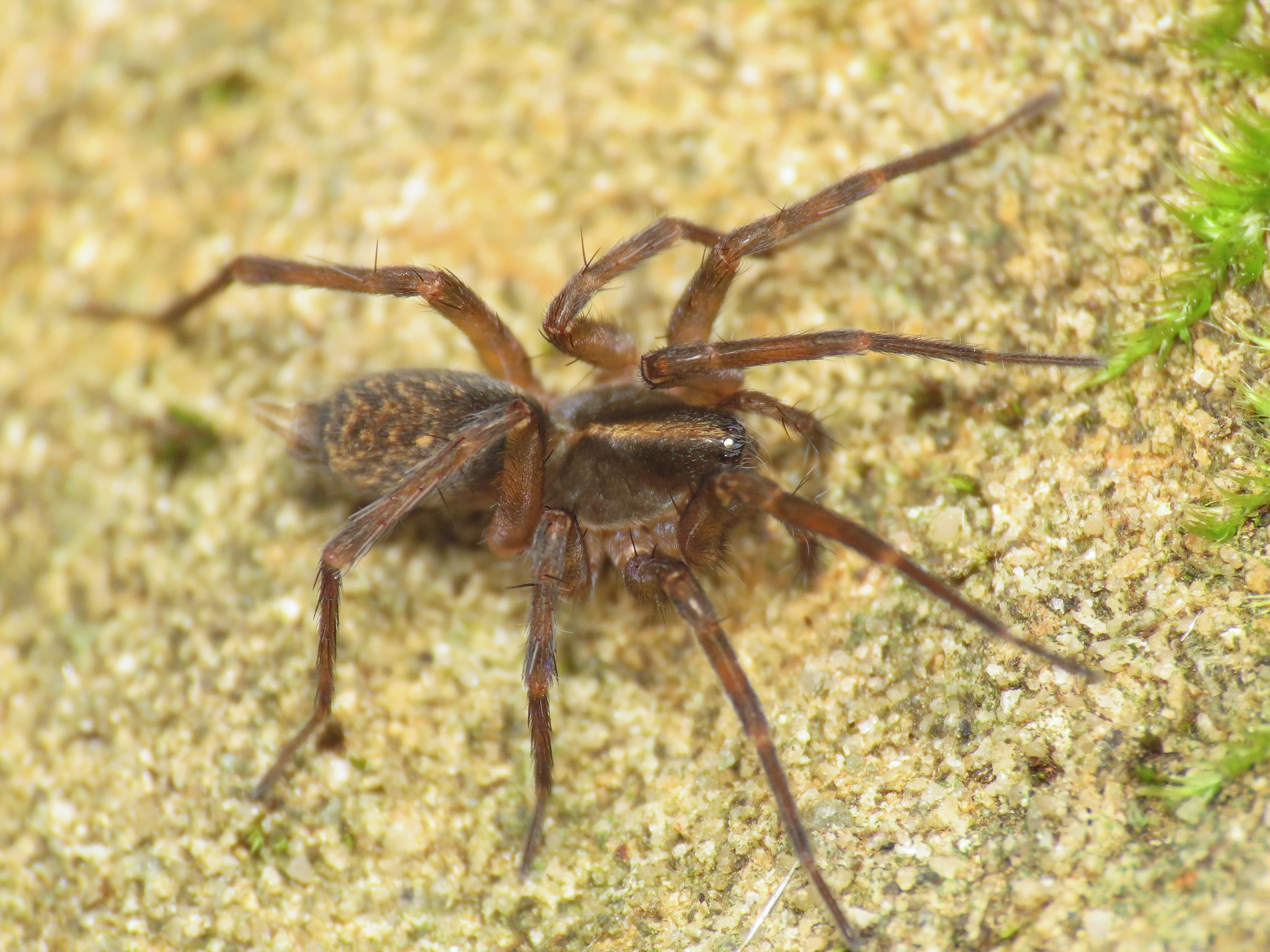
- female H. italica in Italy

Scientific classification
- Kingdom: Animalia
- Phylum: Arthropoda
- Subphylum: Chelicerata
- Class: Arachnida
- Order: Araneae
- Infraorder: Araneomorphae
- Family: Agelenidae
- Genus: Histopona; Thorell, 1870

Type species
- H. torpida (C. L. Koch, 1837)

Species
- 23, see text

Synonyms
- Roeweriana

= Histopona =

Histopona Temporal range: Palaeogene–present

Genus of spiders

Histopona is a genus of funnel weavers first described as a sub-genus of Hadites by Tamerlan Thorell in 1870. It was elevated to genus by Brignoli in 1972.

== Species ==
As of October 2026 it contains twenty-three species:

- Histopona bidens (Absolon & Kratochvíl, 1933) – Croatia, Macedonia
- Histopona breviemboli Dimitrov, Deltshev & Lazarov, 2017 – Bulgaria, Turkey (Europe)
- Histopona conveniens (Kulczyński, 1914) – Bosnia and Herzegovina
- Histopona dubia (Absolon & Kratochvíl, 1933) – Croatia, Bosnia and Herzegovina
- Histopona egonpretneri Deeleman-Reinhold, 1983 – Croatia
- Histopona fioni Bolzern, Pantini & Isaia, 2013 – Switzerland, Italy
- Histopona hauseri (Brignoli, 1972) – Greece, Macedonia
- Histopona isolata Deeleman-Reinhold, 1983 – Greece (Crete)
- Histopona italica Brignoli, 1977 – Italy
- Histopona krivosijana (Kratochvíl, 1935) – Montenegro
- Histopona kurkai Deltshev & Indzhov, 2018 – Albania, Macedonia
- Histopona laeta (Kulczyński, 1897) – Balkans
- Histopona leonardoi Bolzern, Pantini & Isaia, 2013 – Switzerland, Italy
- Histopona luxurians (Kulczyński, 1897) – Austria to Ukraine and south-eastern Europe
- Histopona myops (Simon, 1885) – South-eastern Europe
- Histopona palaeolithica (Brignoli, 1971) – Italy, Montenegro
- Histopona petrovi Isaia & Mammola, 2019 – Montenegro
- Histopona sinuata (Kulczyński, 1897) – Romania
- Histopona strinatii (Brignoli, 1976) – Greece
- Histopona thaleri Gasparo, 2005 – Greece
- Histopona torpida (C. L. Koch, 1837) – Europe, Caucasus
- Histopona tranteevi Deltshev, 1978 – Bulgaria
- Histopona vignai Brignoli, 1980 – Albania, Macedonia, Greece
