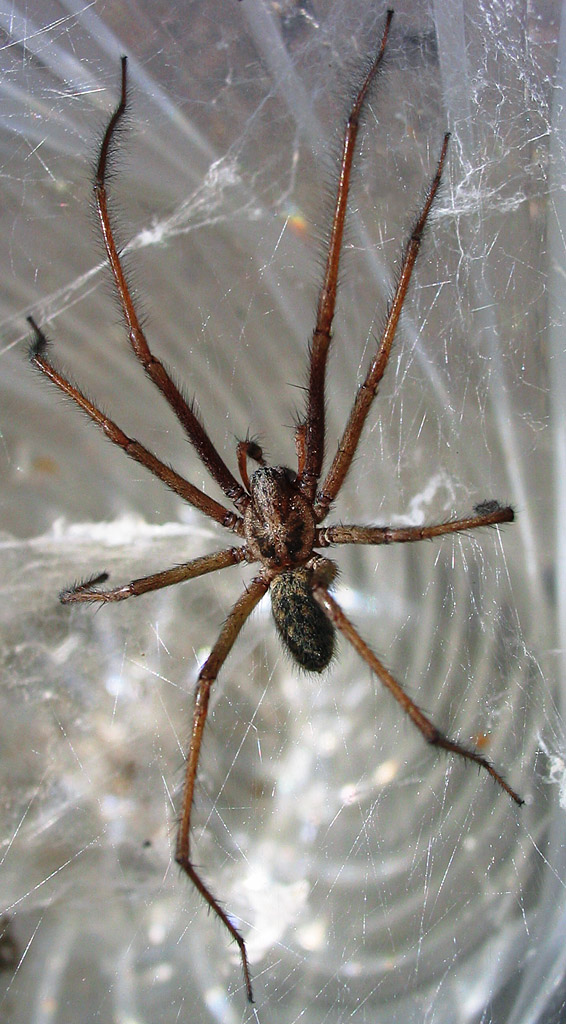

Scientific classification
- Kingdom: Animalia
- Phylum: Arthropoda
- Subphylum: Chelicerata
- Class: Arachnida
- Order: Araneae
- Infraorder: Araneomorphae
- Family: Agelenidae
- Genus: Eratigena
- Species: E. atrica

Binomial name
- Eratigena atrica (C. L. Koch, 1843)
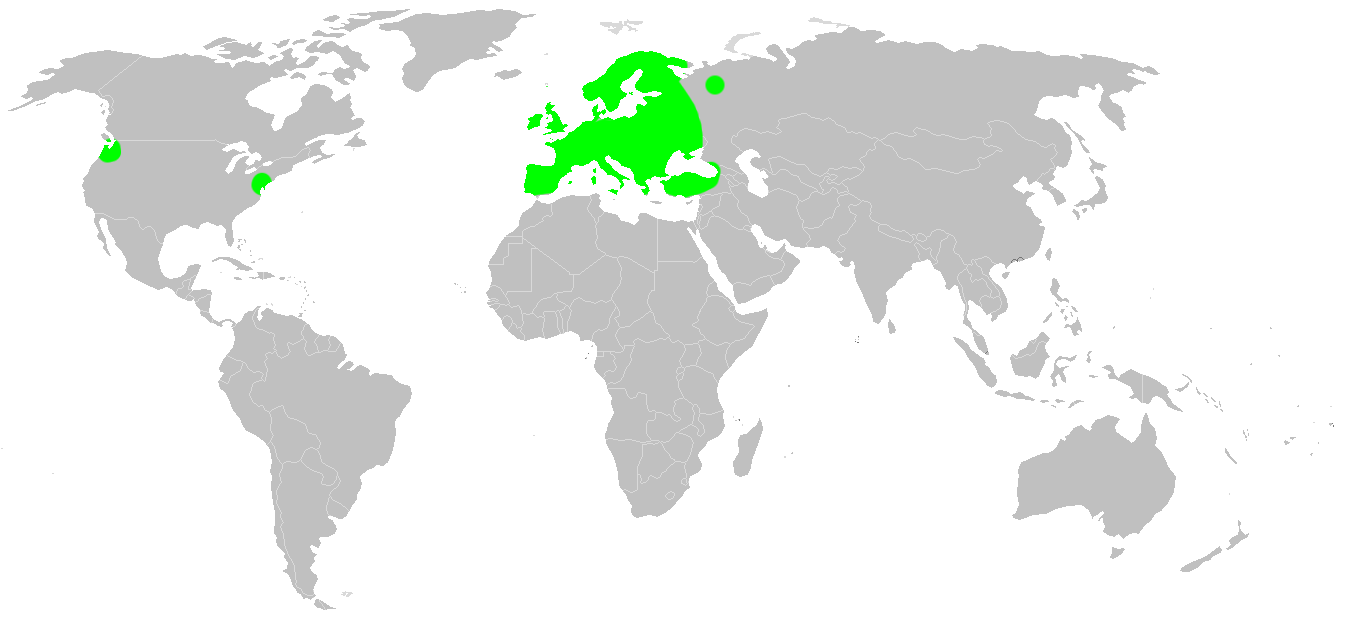

Synonyms
- Philoica atrica (C. L. Koch, 1843); Tegenaria atrica C. L. Koch, 1843; Tegenaria derouetae Denis, 1959; Tegenaria deroueti Dresco, 1957; Tegenaria duellica Simon, 1875; Tegenaria gigantea Chamberlin & Ivie, 1935; Tegenaria hibernica O. Pickard-Cambridge, 1891; Tegenaria larva Simon, 1875; Tegenaria nervosa Simon, 1870; Tegenaria praegrandis Fox, 1937; Tegenaria propinqua Locket, 1975; Tegenaria saeva Blackwall, 1844

= Giant house spider =

Type of spider

The giant house spider has been treated as either one species, under the name Eratigena atrica, or as three species, E. atrica, E. duellica and E. saeva. The three-species-view was accepted by the World Spider Catalog in 2020. They are among the largest spiders of Central and Northern Europe. They were previously placed in the genus Tegenaria. In 2013, they were moved to the new genus Eratigena as the single species Eratigena atrica. In 2018, the three separate species were restored. The bite of these species does not pose a threat to humans or pets, and they are generally reluctant to bite, preferring instead to hide or escape.

== Description ==
The three species can be distinguished only by microscopic external and internal measurements, in particular for males by the shape of parts of the palpal bulb and for females by the shape of the openings to the spermathecae. The visual description below applies to all three.

The two sexes do not differ in coloration or markings. Its coloration is mainly dark-brown. On its sternum is a lighter marking, with three light spots on each side that form an arrow-like shape pointing toward the head of the spider. The opisthosoma features a lighter middle line with six "spots" on each side. The giant house spider has the same coloration as the domestic house spider, Tegenaria domestica; it has earthy tones of brown and muddy-red or yellow. They also have conspicuously hairy legs, palps, and abdomen. The female body-size can reach 18.5 mm (0.73 in) in length, with males having a slightly smaller body at around 12 to 15 mm (0.5 to 0.6 in) in length. The female leg-span is typically around 45 mm (1.8 in). The leg span of the male is highly variable, with spans between 25 and 75 mm (1.0 and 3.0 in) being common. Adult males have larger pedipalps and a more slender abdomen than females.

Its eight eyes are of equal size and are arranged in two rows. As the eyes contain relatively few visual cells, the giant house spider can probably only distinguish light and dark.

== Taxonomy ==
The first description of a spider now assigned to this species was by Carl Ludwig Koch in 1843, under the name Tegenaria atrica. Other supposedly different species were described later, including Tegenaria saeva by John Blackwall in 1844, Tegenaria duellica by Eugène Simon in 1875 and Tegenaria gigantea by Ralph Vary Chamberlin and Wilton Ivie in 1935. T. gigantea was synonymized with T. duellica in 1978. The three remaining taxa have been regarded as distinct species, particularly in Britain. Thus Roberts (1995) provides distinguishing characters for T. atrica, T. duellica, and T. saeva, as does Oxford (2008) for T. duellica (as T. gigantea) and T. saeva, and Oxford (2023) for all three species. Others consider these three as part of a single morphologically-variable species, for which the oldest name, and hence the senior synonym, is T. atrica.

A phylogenetic study in 2013 concluded that Tegenaria, as then defined, was not monophyletic, and split off some species, including T. atrica, into the newly created segregate genus Eratigena. The study also consolidated the various giant house spider species into one species, E. atrica. A subsequent genetic and morphological study determined that there were three distinct morphological groups, leading to the restoration of three separate species: E. atrica, E. duellica, and E. saeva.

== Distribution and habitat ==
Giant house spiders are found in Europe, Central Asia, and Northern Africa. They were unwittingly introduced to the Pacific Northwest of North America circa 1900 due to human activity and have strongly increased in numbers for the last century. In North America, E. duellica is widespread throughout the Pacific Northwest, while E. atrica is recorded in four Canadian provinces; E. saeva does not seem to be present.

The spider has been found in several European countries in which it was previously not recorded, like Estonia, Latvia, and Lithuania. It is recorded in the checklist of Danish spider species, and is also found in Iceland.

The giant house spider's original habitat consists mostly of caves, or dry forests where it is found under rocks, but it is a common spider in people's homes. When living in buildings it favors dark and hidden areas such as basements, behind or under furniture, or inside walls.

== Biology and behaviour ==
The webs built by the giant house spider are flat and messy with a funnel at one end. They do not contain sticky threads. The spider lurks in the funnel until a small invertebrate happens to get trapped in the web, at which point the spider runs out and attacks it. They usually build their webs in corners (on both the floor and ceiling), between boxes in basements, behind cupboards, in attics, or any other area that is rarely-disturbed by large animals or humans. They are also often found near window-openings.

Giant house spiders normally live for two or three years, but lifetimes of up to six years have been observed. While the female only leaves its nest to feed, males can often be seen wandering around houses during the late summer and early autumn looking for a mate. Males can be found from July to October; adult females occur all year.

At least 60 spiderlings emerge from an egg-sac. Unusually for spiders, they are subsocial at this stage: They remain together for about a month, but do not co-operate in prey-capture. The amount of cannibalism correlates with the amount of available food. Giant house spiders molt seven or eight times before reaching the immature adult state, and after a final molt reach maturity.

Like most spiders, it possesses venom to subdue its prey. Since the giant house spider's bites can penetrate human skin, the effects of agatoxin might be felt by bite-victims, though these spiders will not bite unless provoked. The usual reaction is localized pain and swelling.

== Relationship with Eratigena agrestis ==
A population of giant house spiders is popularly thought to be a deterrent to the establishment of Eratigena agrestis, known in North America as the "hobo spider", and considered by some to be more likely to bite humans. Giant house spiders may compete with hobo spiders for the same resources.

Hobo spiders grow to a body size no more than 15 mm (0.59 in) long; whereas the larger female giant house spider can have a body size of 18 mm (0.71 in) and has proportionately longer legs.

== In popular culture ==
An essay "April & Paris" by humorist David Sedaris documents his growing affection toward and domestic association with giant house spiders, particularly one named April. The essay can be found in the collection When You Are Engulfed in Flames.

== Gallery ==
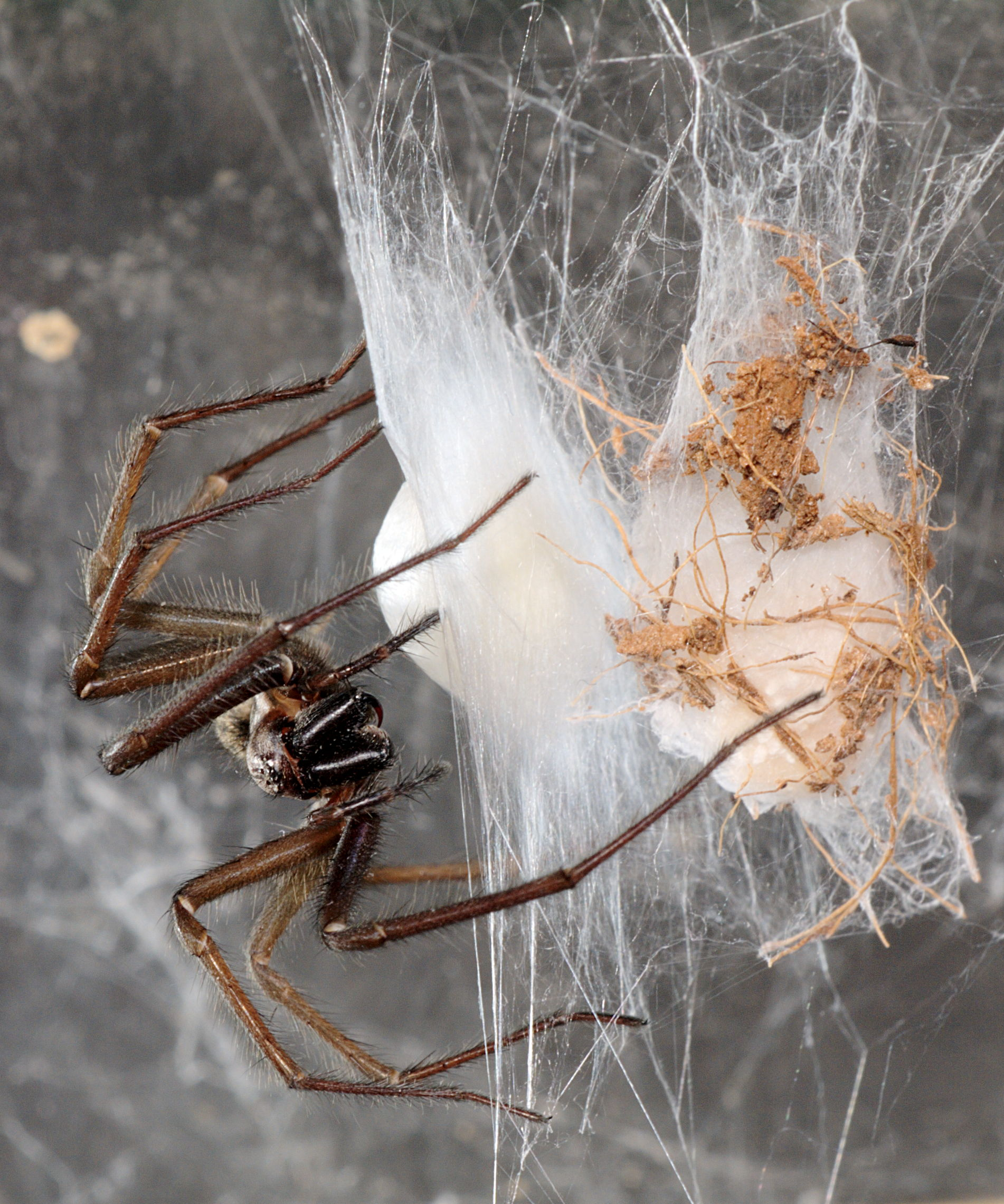
Female constructing egg-sac

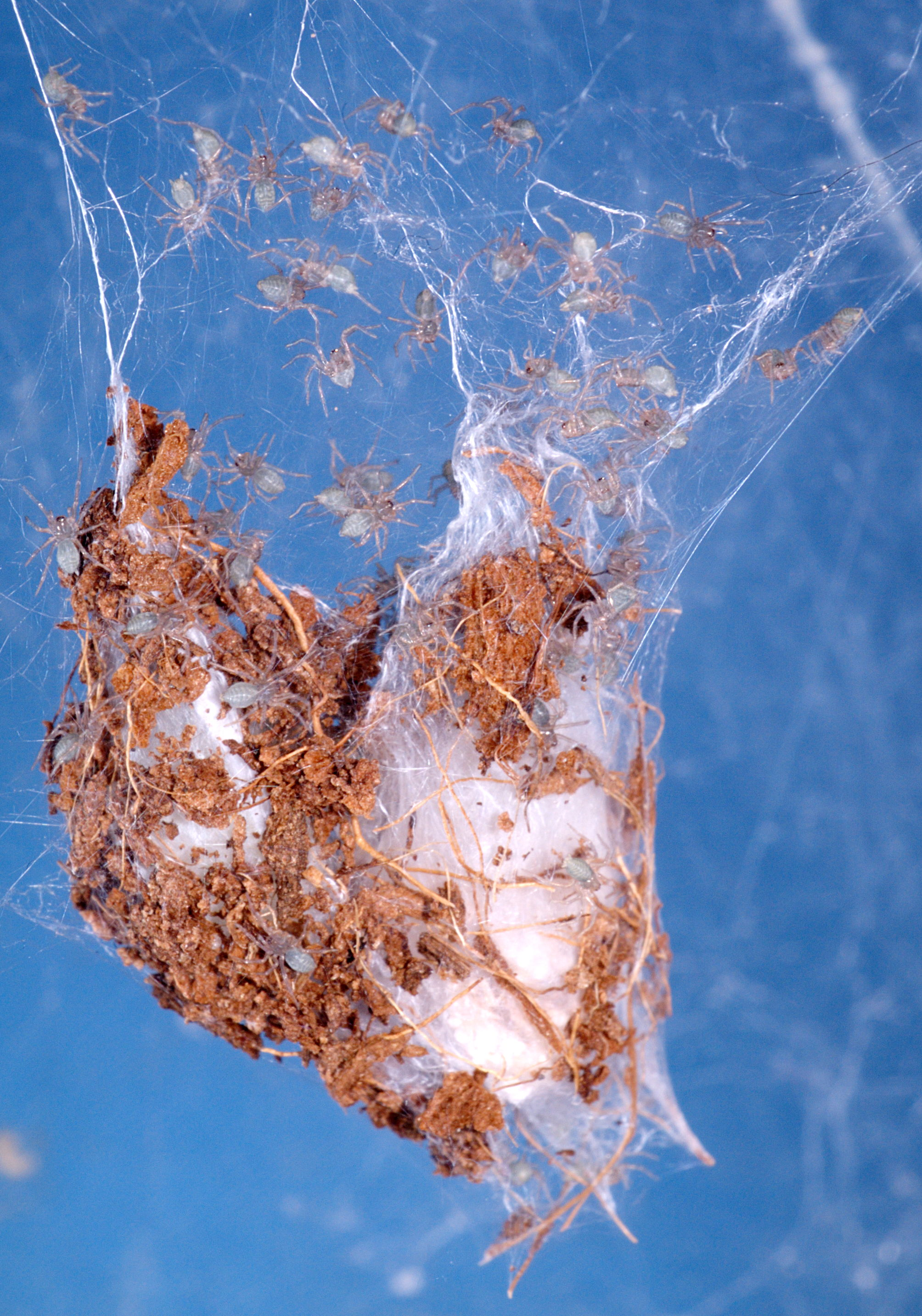
Spiderlings

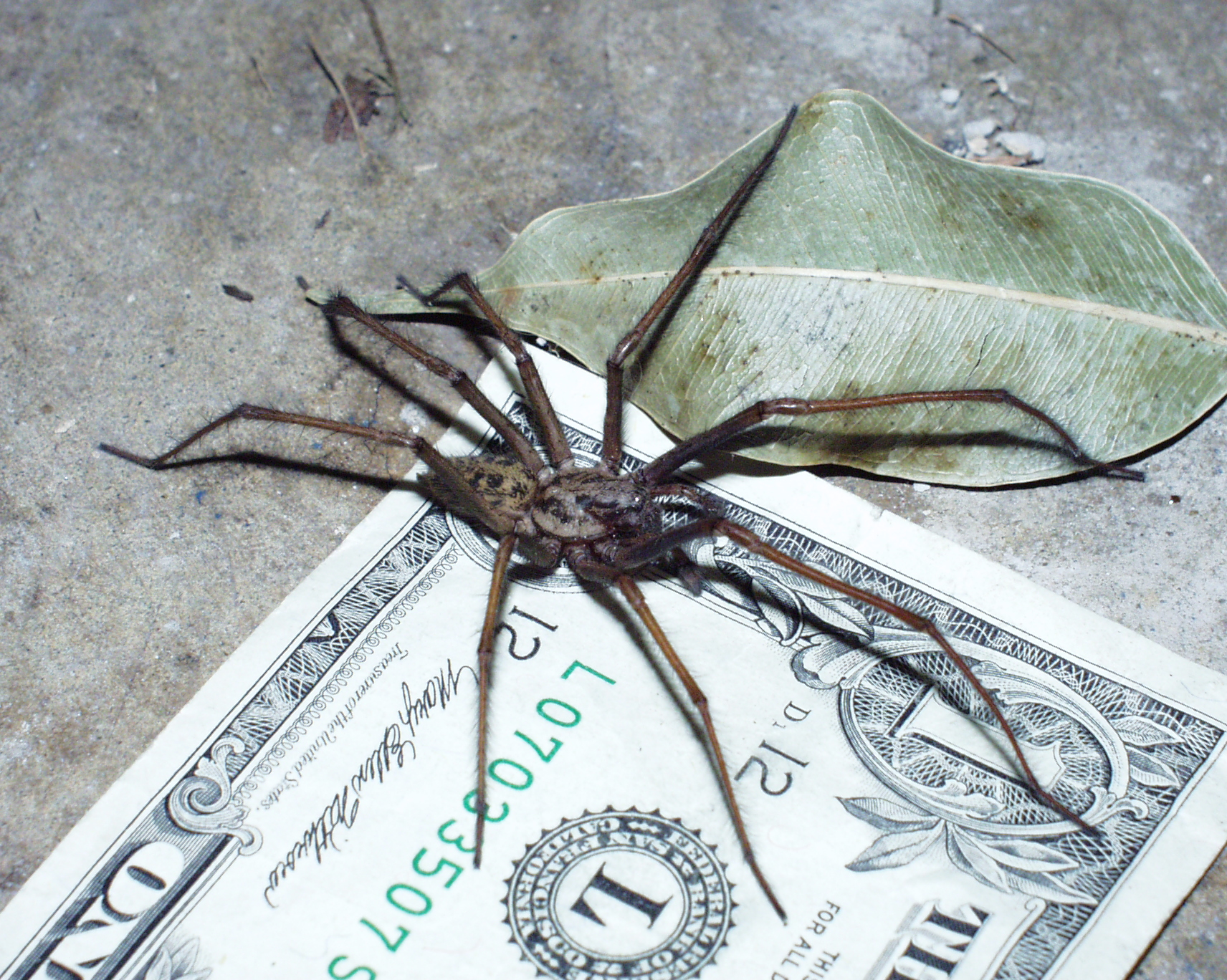
E. duellica can attain a leg span of up to 4 in (100 mm). This specimen from the USA is approximately 3 in (76 mm)

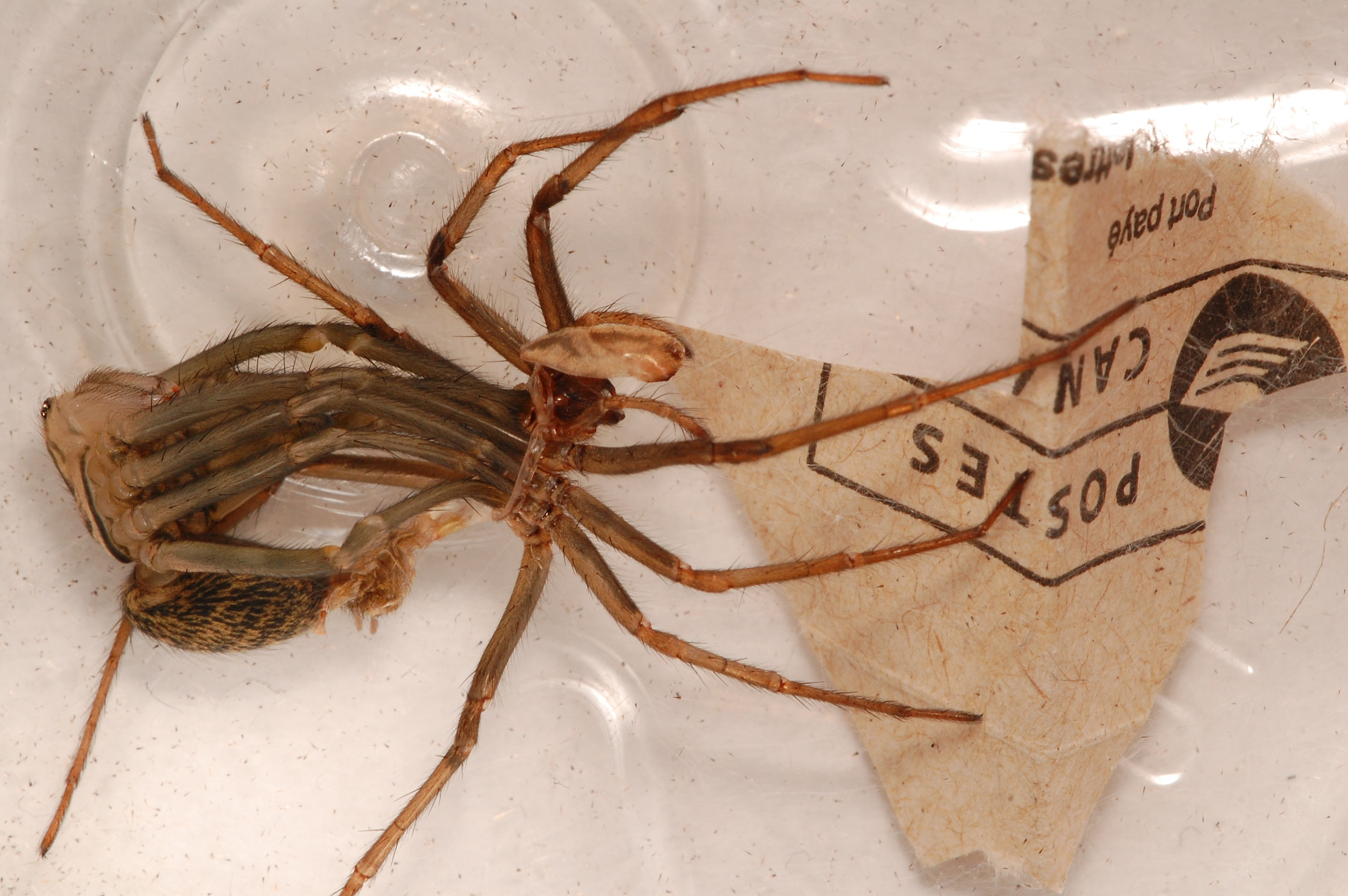
A molting E. duellica
