= Eratigena saeva =

Scientific classification
- Kingdom: Animalia
- Phylum: Arthropoda
- Subphylum: Chelicerata
- Class: Arachnida
- Order: Araneae
- Infraorder: Araneomorphae
- Family: Agelenidae
- Genus: Eratigena
- Species: E. saeva

Binomial name
- Eratigena saeva (Blackwall, 1844)

Synonyms
- Tegenaria saeva Blackwall, 1844

Species of spider

Eratigena saeva is a species of spider found in Europe. It is one of three species of the "Eratigena atrica group" (the giant house spiders), along with Eratigena atrica and Eratigena duellica.

== Description ==
The species looks very similar to Eratigena atrica and Eratigena duellica, and the only reliable way to distinguish it is analysis of the genitalia. Males reach a body length of 10 to 14 mm (0.39 to 0.55 in) and females are slightly larger at 11 to 16 mm (0.43 to 0.63 in).

== Distribution ==
This species is present in Ireland, United Kingdom, Portugal, Spain, Andorra, France (including the island of Corsica) and Belgium. It is also reported in southwestern Canada and northwestern United States.

== Habitats ==
This species is synanthropic and it often occurs in houses, garages and sheds. In warmer localities it can also be found under stones, in rock, stone and tree crevices, in rabbit holes, overhanging banks or very dense vegetation.

== Web ==
Similarly to Eratigena atrica and Eratigena duellica, this species builds typical sheet-like webs with a funnel-shaped retreat.

== Life history ==
Fertilized females produce egg sacs in the spring and the spiderlings develop over the course of the year. Spiders of both sexes overwinter as juveniles and mature the following year. Mating occurs in autumn, this is the time of year when people have the highest chance to encounter these spiders in their houses since males leave their webs to look for females. The males die after mating but females overwinter with stored sperm and lay eggs in the spring of the following year.
