= Moçâmedes Desert =

Northern area of the Namib desert

The Moçâmedes Desert is a desert located in the deep southwest of Angola, near the border with Namibia. The desert forms the northern tip of the Namib Desert. From the Atlantic Ocean in the west, the desert gradually rises to a semiarid plain where African ironwood trees grow. Few people live in the desert; communities are found mainly in small fishing towns on the coast. The unique tumboa (Welwitschia mirabilis), a desert plant with a short, wide trunk and two gigantic leaves that can survive for a century, is endemic to the desert. Little water is present in the desert surface.
