= Félix de Avelar Brotero =

Portuguese botanist and professor

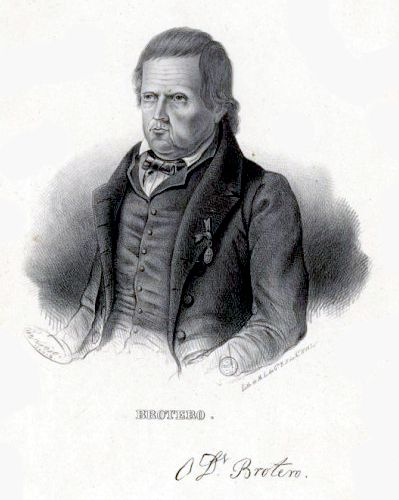
- Born: 25 November 1744; Loures, Kingdom of Portugal
- Died: 4 August 1828 (aged 83); Lisbon, Kingdom of Portugal
- Occupation: Botanist

Félix de Avelar Brotero (25 November 1744 – 4 August 1828) was a Portuguese botanist and professor. He fled to France in 1788 to escape persecution by the Portuguese Inquisition, and there published his Compendio de Botanica in order to earn his living. It immediately established his reputation as a botanist, and upon his return to Portugal in 1790 he was given the chair of botany and agriculture at the University of Coimbra. His two best known works, Flora lusitanica, 1804, and Phytographia Lusitaniae selectior, 1816–1827, were the first lengthy descriptions of native Portuguese plants. As director of the botanical gardens at Coimbra (see Botanical Garden of the University of Coimbra) and Ajuda (Lisbon), he reorganized and enlarged them.

== List of selected publications ==
- Brotero, Félix de Avellar (1804). Flora lusitanica, seu, Plantarum, quae in Lusitania vel sponte crescunt, vel frequentius coluntur, ex florum praesertim sexubus systematice distributarum, synopsis. 2 vols (in Latin). Lisbon.(also available on Internet Archive -)
  - Part 1
  - Part 2
